= List of craters on the Moon: C–F =

The list of approved names in the Gazetteer of Planetary Nomenclature maintained by the International Astronomical Union includes the diameter of the crater and the person the crater is named for. Where a crater formation has associated satellite craters, these are detailed on the main crater description pages.

List of craters on the Moon

- A
- B
- C
- D
- E
- F
- G
- H
- I
- J
- K
- L
- M
- N
- O
- P
- Q
- R
- S
- T
- U
- V
- W
- X
- Y
- Z

== C ==
Crater	Coordinates	Diameter (km)	Approval Year	Eponym	Ref
C. Herschel	34.48°N 31.29°W	13.7	1935	Caroline Herschel (1750–1848)	WGPSN
C. Mayer	63.26°N 17.31°E	37.54	1935	Christian Mayer (1719–1783)	WGPSN
Cabannes	61.24°S 170.21°W	81.3	1970	Jean Cabannes (1885–1959)	WGPSN
Cabeus	85.33°S 42.13°W	100.58	1935	Niccolò Cabeo (1586–1650)	WGPSN
Cailleux	60.41°S 153.5°E	52.85	1997	Andre Cailleux (1907–1986)	WGPSN
Cai Lun	80.12°N 113.66°E	44.89	2010	Cai Lun (57–131)	WGPSN
Cajal	12.59°N 31.08°E	8.57	1973	Santiago Ramón y Cajal (1852–1934)	WGPSN
Cajori	47.67°S 168.7°E	74.65	1970	Florian Cajori (1859–1930)	WGPSN
Calippus	38.92°N 10.72°E	34.03	1935	Calippus of Cyzicus (c. 330 BC)	WGPSN
Cameron	6.19°N 45.93°E	10.91	1973	Robert Curry Cameron (1925–1972)	WGPSN
Campanus	28.04°S 27.9°W	46.41	1935	Campanus of Novara (c. 1220 – 1296)	WGPSN
Campbell	45.57°N 152.91°E	222.48	1970	Leon Campbell (1881–1951) and William Wallace Campbell (1862–1938)	WGPSN
Cannizzaro	55.5°N 99.73°W	54.51	1970	Stanislao Cannizzaro (1826–1910)	WGPSN
Cannon	19.88°N 81.36°E	57.58	1964	Annie Jump Cannon (1863–1941)	WGPSN
Cantor	38.04°N 118.69°E	75.72	1970	Georg Cantor (1845–1918) and Moritz Cantor (1829–1920)	WGPSN
Capella	7.65°S 34.92°E	48.13	1935	Martianus Capella (circa 400 AD)	WGPSN
Capuanus	34.09°S 26.73°W	59.69	1935	Francesco Capuano Di Manfredonia (circa 1400)	WGPSN
Cardanus	13.27°N 72.5°W	49.57	1935	Girolamo Cardano (1501–1576)	WGPSN
Carlini	33.75°N 24.12°W	10.66	1935	Francesco Carlini (1783–1862)	WGPSN
Carlos	24.91°N 2.28°E	4.67	1976	(Spanish male name)	WGPSN
Carmichael	19.53°N 40.36°E	19.73	1973	Leonard Carmichael (1898–1973)	WGPSN
Carnot	52.09°N 144.2°W	126.06	1970	Nicolas Léonard Sadi Carnot (1796–1832)	WGPSN
Carol	8.48°N 122.37°E	6.25	1979	(Latin female name)	WGPSN
Carpenter	69.52°N 51.23°W	59.06	1935	James Carpenter (1840–1899) and Edwin Francis Carpenter (1898–1963)	WGPSN
Carrel	10.67°N 26.68°E	15.59	1979	Alexis Carrel (1873–1944)	WGPSN
Carrillo	2.11°S 80.96°E	17.85	1979	Nabor Carrillo Flores (1911–1967)	WGPSN
Carrington	43.97°N 62.04°E	27.77	1935	Richard Christopher Carrington (1826–1875)	WGPSN
Carroll		5.6	xxxx	Anne Carroll Taylor Wiseman, late wife of Commander Reid Wiseman, astronaut on the Artemis 2 mission	WGPSN
Cartan	4.24°N 59.29°E	15.62	1976	Élie J. Cartan (1869–1951)	WGPSN
Cartwright	87.65°S 46.95°W	17.00	2025	Mary Cartwright (1900–1998)	WGPSN
Carver	43.46°S 127.6°E	62.45	1970	George Washington Carver (c. 1864–1943)	WGPSN
Casatus	72.7°S 30.75°W	102.85	1935	Paolo Casati (1617–1707)	WGPSN
Cassegrain	51.95°S 113.3°E	56.66	1970	Laurent Cassegrain (c.1629–1693)	WGPSN
Cassini	40.25°N 4.64°E	56.88	1935	Giovanni Domenico Cassini (1625–1712) and Jacques Cassini (1677–1756)	WGPSN
Catalán	45.7°S 87.37°W	26.77	1970	Miguel A. Catalán (1894–1957)	WGPSN
Catharina	17.98°S 23.55°E	98.77	1935	Saint Catherine of Alexandria (died c. 307)	WGPSN
Cauchy	9.56°N 38.63°E	11.8	1935	Augustin-Louis Cauchy (1789–1857)	WGPSN
Cavalerius	5.1°N 66.93°W	59.35	1935	Buonaventura Cavalieri (1598–1647)	WGPSN
Cavendish	24.63°S 53.78°W	52.64	1935	Henry Cavendish (1731–1810)	WGPSN
Caventou	29.74°N 29.38°W	2.8	1976	Joseph Bienaime Caventou (1795–1877)	WGPSN
Cayley	3.94°N 15.09°E	14.2	1935	Arthur Cayley (1821–1895)	WGPSN
Celsius	34.1°S 20.05°E	38.96	1935	Anders Celsius (1701–1744)	WGPSN
Censorinus	0.42°S 32.69°E	3.8	1935	Censorinus (flourished 238 AD)	WGPSN
Cepheus	40.68°N 45.78°E	39.43	1935	Cepheus (Greek mythological figure)	WGPSN
Chacornac	29.88°N 31.67°E	50.44	1935	Jean Chacornac (1823–1873)	WGPSN
Chadwick	52.85°S 101.34°W	29.74	1985	Sir James Chadwick (1891–1974)	WGPSN
Chaffee	39.06°S 154.63°W	51.75	1970	Roger B. Chaffee (1935–1967)	WGPSN
Challis	79.58°N 9.09°E	53.21	1935	James Challis (1803–1862)	WGPSN
Chalonge	20.44°S 116.35°W	25.08	1985	Daniel Chalonge (1895–1977)	WGPSN
Chamberlin	58.83°S 96.04°E	60.41	1970	Thomas Chrowder Chamberlin (1843–1928)	WGPSN
Champollion	37.39°N 175.03°E	48.97	1970	Jean-François Champollion (1790–1832)	WGPSN
Chandler	43.65°N 171.76°E	88.6	1970	Seth Carlo Chandler (1846–1913)	WGPSN
Chang Heng	18.9°N 112.21°E	42.65	1970	Zhang Heng (78–139)	WGPSN
Chang-Ngo	12.69°S 2.16°W	2.34	1976	(Chinese female name), Chinese goddess Chang'e	WGPSN
Chant	40.14°S 109.46°W	33.6	1970	Clarence Augustus Chant (1865–1956)	WGPSN
Chaplygin	5.76°S 150.24°E	123.39	1970	Sergej Alekseevich Chaplygin (1869–1942)	WGPSN
Chapman	50.09°N 100.47°W	76.83	1970	Sydney Chapman (1888–1970)	WGPSN
Chappe	61.29°S 91.24°W	55.79	1994	Jean-Baptiste Chappe d'Auteroche (1728–1769)	WGPSN
Chappell	54.53°N 176.77°W	73.92	1970	James F. Chappell (1891–1964)	WGPSN
Charles	29.9°N 26.37°W	1.34	1976	(French male name)	WGPSN
Charlier	36.22°N 131.69°W	109.88	1970	Carl Charlier (1862–1934)	WGPSN
Chaucer	3.39°N 140.71°W	45.48	1970	Geoffrey Chaucer (c. 1340–1400)	WGPSN
Chauvenet	11.64°S 137.2°E	77.67	1970	William Chauvenet (1820–1870)	WGPSN
Chawla	42.48°S 147.49°W	14.25	2006	Kalpana Chawla (1961–2003)	WGPSN
Chebyshev	34.01°S 132.88°W	179.05	1970	Pafnuty L. Chebyshev (1821–1894)	WGPSN
Chernyshev	47.01°N 174.41°E	59.31	1970	Nikolai Chernyshev (1906–1953/1963)	WGPSN
Chevallier	45.01°N 51.57°E	51.83	1935	Temple Chevallier (1794–1873)	WGPSN
Ching-Te	20.02°N 29.97°E	3.7	1976	(Chinese male name)	WGPSN
Chladni	3.99°N 1.12°E	13.07	1935	Ernst Florens Friedrich Chladni (1756–1827)	WGPSN
Chrétien	46.11°S 162.99°E	98.63	1970	Henri Chrétien (1870–1956)	WGPSN
Cichus	33.29°S 21.18°W	39.18	1935	Franceso Degli Stabili Cichus (1257–1327)	WGPSN
Clairaut	47.84°S 13.86°E	76.89	1935	Alexis Claude Clairaut (1713–1765)	WGPSN
Clark	38.67°S 119.35°E	52.11	1970	Alvan Clark (1804–1887) and Alvan Graham Clark (1832–1897)	WGPSN
Clausius	36.9°S 43.93°W	24.2	1935	Rudolf Julius Emmanuel Clausius (1822–1888)	WGPSN
Clavius	58.62°S 14.73°W	230.77	1935	Christopher Klau Clavius (1537–1612)	WGPSN
Cleomedes	27.6°N 55.5°E	130.77	1935	Cleomedes (died c, 50 BC)	WGPSN
Cleostratus	60.32°N 77.4°W	63.23	1935	Cleostratus (died c. 500 BC)	WGPSN
Clerke	21.68°N 29.8°E	6.66	1973	Agnes Mary Clerke (1842–1907)	WGPSN
Coblentz	38.09°S 126.65°E	32.66	1970	William Weber Coblentz (1873–1962)	WGPSN
Cockcroft	31.09°N 162.91°W	92.16	1970	John Douglas Cockcroft (1897–1967)	WGPSN
Collins	1.3°N 23.71°E	2.58	1970	Michael Collins (astronaut) (1930–2021)	WGPSN
Colombo	15.26°S 46.02°E	79.02	1935	Christopher Columbus (c. 1446–1506)	WGPSN
Compton	55.86°N 104.05°E	164.63	1970	Arthur Holly Compton (1892–1962) and Karl Taylor Compton (1887–1954)	WGPSN
Comrie	23.39°N 113.17°W	59.25	1970	Leslie John Comrie (1893–1950)	WGPSN
Comstock	21.59°N 122.05°W	73.23	1970	George Cary Comstock (1855–1934)	WGPSN
Condon	1.87°N 60.36°E	34.85	1976	Edward Uhler Condon (1902–1974)	WGPSN
Condorcet	12.1°N 69.58°E	74.85	1935	Jean Antoine, Marquis de Condorcet (1743–1794)	WGPSN
Congreve	0.28°S 167.84°W	57.61	1970	Sir William Congreve (1772–1828)	WGPSN
Conon	21.66°N 1.95°E	20.96	1935	Conon of Samos (circa 260 BC)	WGPSN
Cook	17.5°S 48.81°E	45.16	1935	James Cook (1728–1779)	WGPSN
Cooper	52.68°N 175.92°E	51.87	1970	John Cobb Cooper (1887–1967)	WGPSN
Copernicus	9.62°N 20.08°W	96.07	1935	Nicolaus Copernicus (1473–1543)	WGPSN
Cori	50.48°S 152.91°W	67.22	1979	Gerty Theresa Radnitz Cori (1896–1957)	WGPSN
Coriolis	0.56°N 171.8°E	78.56	1970	Gaspard-Gustave Coriolis (1792–1843)	WGPSN
Couder	4.9°S 92.58°W	18.56	1985	André Couder (1897–1978)	WGPSN
Coulomb	54.46°N 115°W	89.72	1970	Charles-Augustin de Coulomb (1736–1806)	WGPSN
Courtney	25.14°N 30.81°W	1.24	1976	(English female name)	WGPSN
Cremona	67.24°N 90.86°W	85.12	1964	Luigi Cremona (1830–1903)	WGPSN
Crile	14.21°N 45.98°E	9.3	1976	George Washington Crile (1864–1943)	WGPSN
Crocco	46.98°S 150.51°E	67.5	1970	Gaetano Arturo Crocco (1877–1968)	WGPSN
Crommelin	67.46°S 147.95°W	93.48	1970	Andrew Claude de la Cherois Crommelin (1865–1939)	WGPSN
Crookes	10.4°S 165.1°W	48.25	1970	Sir William Crookes (1832–1919)	WGPSN
Crozier	13.56°S 50.72°E	22.51	1935	Francis Rawdon Moira Crozier (1796–1848)	WGPSN
Crüger	16.68°S 66.96°W	45.94	1935	Peter Crüger (1580–1639)	WGPSN
Ctesibius	0.83°N 118.75°E	32.1	1976	Ctesibius (died c. 100 BC)	WGPSN
Curie	23.05°S 92.28°E	138.87	1970	Pierre Curie (1859–1906)	WGPSN
Curtis	14.57°N 56.79°E	2.88	1973	Heber Doust Curtis (1859–1906)	WGPSN
Curtius	67.08°S 4.4°E	99.29	1935	Albert Curtz (1600–1671)	WGPSN
Cusanus	71.82°N 69.4°E	60.87	1935	Nikolaus Krebs Cusanus (1401–1464)	WGPSN
Cuvier	50.29°S 9.69°E	77.3	1935	Georges Cuvier (1769–1832)	WGPSN
Cyrano	20.37°S 157.37°E	79.58	1970	Cyrano de Bergerac Savinien (1615–1655)	WGPSN
Cyrillus	13.29°S 24.07°E	98.09	1935	Saint Cyril (died 444 AD)	WGPSN
Cysatus	66.21°S 6.34°W	47.77	1935	Jean-Baptiste Cysat (1588–1657)	WGPSN

back to top

== D ==
Crater	Coordinates	Diameter (km)	Approval Year	Eponym	Ref
D. Brown	41.65°S 147.16°W	16.12	2006	David McDowell Brown (1956–2003)	WGPSN
da Vinci	9.1°N 44.95°E	37.46	1935	Leonardo da Vinci (1452–1519)	WGPSN
Daedalus	5.83°S 179.4°E	93.61	1970	Daedalus	WGPSN
Dag	18.71°N 5.26°E	0.36	1976	(Scandinavian male name)	WGPSN
Daguerre	11.91°S 33.61°E	45.79	1935	Louis Daguerre (1789–1851)	WGPSN
Dale	9.56°S 82.93°E	23.41	1976	Henry Hallett Dale (1875–1968)	WGPSN
d'Alembert	51.07°N 164.89°E	233.55	1970	Jean le Rond d'Alembert (1717–1783)	WGPSN
Dalton	17.07°N 84.45°W	60.69	1964	John Dalton (1766–1844)	WGPSN
Daly	5.74°N 59.5°E	14.96	1973	Reginald Aldworth Daly (1871–1957)	WGPSN
Damoiseau	4.85°S 61.25°W	36.66	1935	Marie Charles Theodor De Damoiseau (1768–1846)	WGPSN
Daniell	35.42°N 31.16°E	28.2	1935	John Frederick Daniell (1790–1845)	WGPSN
Danjon	11.42°S 123.9°E	69.3	1970	André Danjon (1890–1967)	WGPSN
Dante	25.36°N 180°E	53.83	1970	Dante Alighieri (1265–1321)	WGPSN
Darney	14.61°S 23.57°W	14.81	1935	Maurice Darney (1882–1958)	WGPSN
D'Arrest	2.26°N 14.6°E	29.67	1935	Heinrich L. d'Arrest (1822–1875)	WGPSN
D'Arsonval	10.31°S 124.59°E	30.36	1976	Jacques Arsene d'Arsonval (1851–1940)	WGPSN
Darwin	19.93°S 69.21°W	122.18	1935	Charles Darwin (1809–1882)	WGPSN
Das	26.49°S 137.05°W	35.95	1970	Amil Kumar Das (1902–1961)	WGPSN
Daubrée	15.73°N 14.75°E	14.67	1973	Gabriel Auguste Daubrée (1814–1896)	WGPSN
Davisson	37.93°S 174.97°W	92.46	1970	Clinton Joseph Davisson (1881–1958)	WGPSN
Davy	11.85°S 8.15°W	33.94	1935	Humphry Davy (1778–1829)	WGPSN
Dawes	17.21°N 26.34°E	17.6	1935	William Rutter Dawes (1799–1868)	WGPSN
Dawson	66.99°S 135.05°W	44.32	1970	Bernhard H. Dawson (1890–1960)	WGPSN
De Forest	76.94°S 163.33°W	56.26	1970	Lee De Forest (1873–1961)	WGPSN
de Gasparis	25.83°S 50.83°W	30.9	1935	Annibale de Gasparis (1819–1892)	WGPSN
de Gerlache	88.48°S 88.34°W	32.71	2000	Adrien de Gerlache (1866–1934)	WGPSN
De La Rue	59.02°N 52.84°E	135.22	1935	Warren De la Rue (1815–1889)	WGPSN
De Moraes	49.38°N 143°E	54.41	1979	Abrahão De Moraes (1916–1970)	WGPSN
De Morgan	3.31°N 14.89°E	9.68	1935	Augustus De Morgan (1806–1871)	WGPSN
De Roy	55.24°S 98.99°W	43.51	1970	Felix De Roy (1883–1942)	WGPSN
De Sitter	79.81°N 38.57°E	63.79	1964	Willem de Sitter (1872–1934)	WGPSN
De Vico	19.71°S 60.32°W	22.13	1935	Francesco de Vico (1805–1848)	WGPSN
De Vries	19.68°S 176.78°W	57.51	1970	Hugo de Vries (1848–1935)	WGPSN
Debes	29.47°N 51.62°E	31.92	1935	Ernst Debes (1840–1923)	WGPSN
Debus	10.68°S 99.68°E	19.77	2000	Kurt Heinrich Debus (1908–1983)	WGPSN
Debye	49.43°N 176.03°W	127.03	1970	Peter Debye (1884–1966)	WGPSN
Dechen	46.12°N 68.18°W	12.04	1935	Ernst Heinrich Karl von Dechen (1800–1889)	WGPSN
Delambre	1.94°S 17.39°E	51.49	1935	Jean Baptiste Joseph Delambre (1749–1822)	WGPSN
Delaunay	22.26°S 2.62°E	44.63	1935	Charles-Eugène Delaunay (1816–1872)	WGPSN
Delia	10.91°S 6.13°W	1.57	1976	(Greek female name)	WGPSN
Delisle	29.98°N 34.68°W	24.83	1935	Joseph-Nicolas Delisle (1688–1768)	WGPSN
Dellinger	6.87°S 140.7°E	82.04	1970	John Howard Dellinger (1886–1962)	WGPSN
Delmotte	27.16°N 60.2°E	32.16	1935	Gabriel Delmotte (1876–1950)	WGPSN
Delporte	15.89°S 121.55°E	42.5	1970	Eugène Joseph Delporte (1882–1955)	WGPSN
Deluc	55.02°S 2.98°W	45.69	1935	Jean-André Deluc (1727–1817)	WGPSN
Dembowski	2.88°N 7.27°E	26.11	1935	Ercole Dembowski (1815–1881)	WGPSN
Democritus	62.31°N 34.99°E	37.78	1935	Democritus (circa 460–360 BC).	WGPSN
Demonax	78.09°S 59.36°E	121.93	1935	Demonax (unknown-circa 100 BC)	WGPSN
Denning	16.26°S 142.76°E	44.18	1970	William Frederick Denning (1848–1931)	WGPSN
Desargues	70.25°N 73.42°W	84.85	1964	Gérard Desargues (1591–1661)	WGPSN
Descartes	11.74°S 15.67°E	47.73	1935	René Descartes (1596–1650)	WGPSN
Deseilligny	21.13°N 20.59°E	6.01	1935	Jules Alfred Pierrot Deseilligny (1868–1918)	WGPSN
Deslandres	32.55°S 5.57°W	227.02	1948	Henri-Alexandre Deslandres (1853–1948)	WGPSN
Deutsch	24.35°N 110.91°E	73.33	1970	Armin Joseph Deutsch (1918–1969)	WGPSN
Dewar	2.61°S 165.62°E	46.31	1970	Sir James Dewar (1842–1923)	WGPSN
Diana	14.29°N 35.65°E	1.55	1979	(Latin female name)	WGPSN
Diderot	20.42°S 121.54°E	20	1979	Denis Diderot (1713–1784)	WGPSN
Dionysius	2.77°N 17.29°E	17.25	1935	St. Dionysius the Areopagite (AD 9–120)	WGPSN
Diophantus	27.62°N 34.3°W	17.57	1935	Diophantus (d. c. AD 300)	WGPSN
Dirichlet	10.58°N 152.05°W	47.24	1970	Peter Gustav Lejeune Dirichlet (1805–1859)	WGPSN
Dobrovolʹskiy	12.83°S 129.68°E	38.4	1973	Georgiy T. Dobrovolskiy (1928–1971)	WGPSN
Doerfel	68.97°S 108.53°W	68.63	1985	Georg Samuel Doerfel (1643–1688)	WGPSN
Dollond	10.48°S 14.41°E	11.04	1935	John Dollond (1706–1761)	WGPSN
Donati	20.69°S 5.1°E	35.84	1935	Giovanni Battista Donati (1826–1873)	WGPSN
Donna	7.22°N 38.3°E	1.84	1979	(Italian female name)	WGPSN
Donner	31.35°S 97.99°E	55.05	1970	Anders Severin Donner (1854–1938)	WGPSN
Doppelmayer	28.48°S 41.51°W	65.08	1935	Johann Gabriel Doppelmayer (1671–1750)	WGPSN
Doppler	12.58°S 159.84°W	101.79	1970	Christian Doppler (1803–1853)	WGPSN
Douglass	35.5°N 122.72°W	50.95	1970	Andrew Ellicott Douglass (1867–1962)	WGPSN
Dove	46.83°S 31.42°E	30.36	1935	Heinrich Wilhelm Dove (1803–1879)	WGPSN
Draper	17.56°N 21.75°W	8.28	1935	Henry Draper (1837–1882)	WGPSN
Drebbel	40.93°S 49.12°W	30.23	1935	Cornelius Drebbel (1572–1634)	WGPSN
Dreyer	10.24°N 97.09°E	63.84	1970	John L. E. Dreyer (1852–1926)	WGPSN
Drude	38.56°S 91.89°W	27.13	1970	Paul Karl Ludwig Drude (1863–1906)	WGPSN
Dryden	33.21°S 156.15°W	54.45	1970	Hugh Latimer Dryden (1898–1965)	WGPSN
Drygalski	79.57°S 87.18°W	162.49	1964	Erich Dagobert von Drygalski (1865–1949)	WGPSN
Dubyago	4.38°N 69.95°E	48.12	1964	Dmitrij Ivanovich Dubyago (1850–1918) and Aleksandr Dmitrievich Dubyago (1903–1959)	WGPSN
Dufay	5.57°N 169.54°E	36.11	1970	Jean Dufay (1896–1967)	WGPSN
Dugan	64.12°N 103.11°E	49.65	1970	Raymond Smith Dugan (1878–1940)	WGPSN
Dunér	44.68°N 179.46°E	65.07	1970	Nils Christoffer Dunér (1839–1914)	WGPSN
Dunthorne	30.12°S 31.71°W	15.12	1935	Richard Dunthorne (1711–1775)	WGPSN
Dyson	60.87°N 121.71°W	63.14	1970	Sir Frank Watson Dyson (1868–1939)	WGPSN
Dziewulski	20.99°N 99.02°E	68.9	1970	Wladyslaw Dziewulski (1878–1962)	WGPSN

back to top

== E ==
Crater	Coordinates	Diameter (km)	Approval Year	Eponym	Ref
Easley	23.69°S 87.97°E	9	2021	Annie Jean Easley (1933–2011)	WGPSN
Eckert	17.28°N 58.38°E	2.62	1973	Wallace John Eckert (1902–1971)	WGPSN
Eddington	21.5°N 72.02°W	120.13	1964	Sir Arthur Stanley Eddington (1882–1944)	WGPSN
Edison	24.88°N 99.27°E	62.72	1961	Thomas A. Edison (1847–1931)	WGPSN
Edith	25.77°S 102.33°E	6.92	1976	(English female name)	WGPSN
Egede	48.72°N 10.64°E	34.18	1935	Hans Egede (1686–1758)	WGPSN
Ehrlich	40.82°N 172.27°W	33.58	1970	Paul Ehrlich (1854–1915)	WGPSN
Eichstadt	22.63°S 78.42°W	49.57	1935	Lorentz Eichstadt (1596–1660)	WGPSN
Eijkman	63.21°S 142.51°W	56.36	1970	Christiaan H. Eijkman (1858–1930)	WGPSN
Eimmart	23.97°N 64.8°E	44.99	1935	Georg Christoph Eimmart (1638–1705)	WGPSN
Einstein	16.6°N 88.65°W	181.47	1964	Albert Einstein (1879–1955)	WGPSN
Einthoven	5.06°S 110.06°E	73.94	1970	Willem Einthoven (1879–1955)	WGPSN
Elger	35.4°S 29.81°W	21.51	1935	Thomas Gwyn Elger (1836–1897)	WGPSN
Ellerman	25.44°S 120.39°W	46.21	1970	Ferdinand Ellerman (1869–1940)	WGPSN
Ellison	54.93°N 108.05°W	36.99	1970	Mervyn Archdall Ellison (1909–1963)	WGPSN
Elmer	10.23°S 84.18°E	16.86	1976	Charles Wesley Elmer (1872–1954)	WGPSN
Elvey	9.01°N 100.64°W	80.21	1970	Christian Thomas Elvey (1899–1970)	WGPSN
Emden	62.76°N 176.51°W	114.64	1970	J. Robert Emden (1862–1940)	WGPSN
Encke	4.57°N 36.68°W	28.27	1935	Johann Franz Encke (1791–1865)	WGPSN
Endymion	53.61°N 56.48°E	122.1	1935	Endymion (Greek mythological figure)	WGPSN
Engelʹgardt	5.39°N 159.47°W	43.51	1970	Vasilij P. Engelʹgardt (Engelhardt) (1828–1915)	WGPSN
Eötvös	35.61°S 134.43°E	101.8	1970	Loránd Eötvös (1848–1919)	WGPSN
Epigenes	67.5°N 4.62°W	54.51	1935	Epigenes of Byzantium (c. 200 BC)	WGPSN
Epimenides	40.92°S 30.33°W	22.56	1935	Epimenides (flourished 596 BC)	WGPSN
Eratosthenes	14.47°N 11.32°W	58.77	1935	Eratosthenes (c. 276–196 BC)	WGPSN
Erlanger	86.99°N 28.62°E	10.94	2009	Joseph Erlanger (1874–1965)	WGPSN
Erro	5.68°N 98.54°E	63.75	1970	Luis Enrique Erro (1897–1955)	WGPSN
Esclangon	21.47°N 42.06°E	15.29	1976	Ernest Esclangon (1876–1954)	WGPSN
Esnault-Pelterie	47.41°N 141.83°W	76.79	1970	Robert Albert Charles Esnault-Pelterie (1881–1957)	WGPSN
Espin	28.15°N 109.34°E	70.01	1970	Rev. Thomas Henry Espinell Compton Espin (1858–1934)	WGPSN
Euclides	7.4°S 29.56°W	11.8	1935	Euclid (c. 300 BC)	WGPSN
Euctemon	76.26°N 30.57°E	62.7	1935	Euctemon (flourished 432 BC)	WGPSN
Eudoxus	44.27°N 16.23°E	70.16	1935	Eudoxus of Cnidus (circa 408–355 BC)	WGPSN
Euler	23.26°N 29.18°W	26.03	1935	Leonhard Euler (1707–1783)	WGPSN
Evans	9.63°S 133.78°W	69.4	1970	Sir Arthur Evans (1851–1941)	WGPSN
Evdokimov	34.57°N 153.04°W	48.88	1970	Mykola Yevdokymov (1868–1940)	WGPSN
Evershed	35.3°N 159.51°W	65.28	1970	John Evershed (1864–1956)	WGPSN
Ewen	7.69°N 121.46°E	2.6	1979	(Gaelic male name)	WGPSN

back to top

== F ==
Crater	Coordinates	Diameter (km)	Approval Year	Eponym	Ref
Fabbroni	18.66°N 29.27°E	10.55	1976	Giovanni Valentino Mattia Fabbroni (1752–1822)	WGPSN
Fabricius	42.75°S 41.84°E	78.9	1935	David Fabricius (1564–1617)	WGPSN
Fabry	43.07°N 100.68°E	179.44	1970	Charles Fabry (1867–1945)	WGPSN
Fahrenheit	13.12°N 61.71°E	6.65	1976	Gabriel Fahrenheit (1686–1736)	WGPSN
Fairouz	26.07°S 102.95°E	2.87	1976	(Arabic female name)	WGPSN
Faraday	42.45°S 8.75°E	69.03	1935	Michael Faraday (1791–1867)	WGPSN
Faustini	87.18°S 84.31°E	42.48	1994	Arnoldo Faustini (1874–1944)	WGPSN
Fauth	6.23°N 20.14°W	11.94	1935	Philipp Johann Heinrich Fauth (1867–1941)	WGPSN
Faye	21.39°S 3.81°E	38.02	1935	Hervé Faye (1814–1902)	WGPSN
Fechner	58.25°S 125.03°E	59.32	1970	Gustav Theodor Fechner (1801–1887)	WGPSN
Fedorov	28.23°N 37.05°W	6.08	1979	Aleksandr Petrovich Fedorov (1872–1920)	WGPSN
Felix	25.09°N 25.38°W	1.45	1979	(Latin male name)	WGPSN
Fényi	44.94°S 105.06°W	43.31	1970	Gyula Fényi (1845–1927)	WGPSN
Feoktistov	30.73°N 140.5°E	22.06	1970	Konstantin Petrovich Feoktistov (born 1926)	WGPSN
Fermat	22.71°S 19.79°E	37.77	1935	Pierre de Fermat (1601–1665)	WGPSN
Fermi	19.61°S 123.24°E	241.41	1970	Enrico Fermi (1901–1954)	WGPSN
Fernelius	38.18°S 4.86°E	68.42	1935	Jean Fernel (1497–1558)	WGPSN
Fersman	17.9°N 126.06°W	148.14	1970	Aleksandr Yevgenyevich Fersman (1883–1945)	WGPSN
Fesenkov	23.16°S 135.14°E	36.12	1973	Vasiliy Grigorʹevich Fesenkov (1889–1972)	WGPSN
Feuillée	27.37°N 9.46°W	8.94	1935	Louis Feuillée (1660–1732)	WGPSN
Fibiger	86.14°N 37.13°E	21.1	2009	Johannes Andreas Grib Fibiger (1867–1928)	WGPSN
Finsch	23.58°N 21.27°E	4.05	1976	Otto Friedrich Hermann Finsch (1839–1917)	WGPSN
Finsen	42.29°S 177.72°W	72.98	1979	Niels Ryberg Finsen (1860–1904)	WGPSN
Firmicus	7.25°N 63.43°E	56.81	1935	Firmicus Maternus (died c. 330)	WGPSN
Firsov	4.2°N 112.7°E	51	1970	Georgij Frolovich Firsov (1917–1960)	WGPSN
Fischer	7.99°N 142.44°E	30.48	1976	Hermann Emil Fischer (1852–1919) and Hans Fischer (1881–1945)	WGPSN
Fitzgerald	26.67°N 172.14°W	104.21	1970	George Francis Fitzgerald (1851–1901)	WGPSN
Fizeau	58.19°S 134.11°W	107.08	1970	Armand Hippolyte L. Fizeau (1819–1896)	WGPSN
Flammarion	3.33°S 3.73°W	76.18	1935	Camille Flammarion (1842–1925)	WGPSN
Flamsteed	4.49°S 44.34°W	19.34	1935	John Flamsteed (1646–1719)	WGPSN
Fleming	14.91°N 109.28°E	126.37	1970	Alexander Fleming (1881–1955) and Williamina P. Fleming (1857–1911)	WGPSN
Florensky	25.45°N 131.85°E	69.03	1985	Kirill Pavlovich Florensky (1915–1982)	WGPSN
Florey	87.04°N 19.75°W	69.06	2009	Howard Florey (1898–1968)	WGPSN
Focas	33.7°S 93.91°W	22.04	1970	Ionnas Focas (1908–1969)	WGPSN
Fontana	16.04°S 56.79°W	31.47	1935	Francesco Fontana (c. 1585–1656)	WGPSN
Fontenelle	63.42°N 18.96°W	37.68	1935	Bernard le Bovier de Fontenelle (1657–1757)	WGPSN
Foster	23.59°N 141.49°W	37.02	1970	John Stuart Foster (1890–1964)	WGPSN
Foucault	50.46°N 39.86°W	25.08	1935	Léon Foucault (1819–1868)	WGPSN
Fourier	30.31°S 53.1°W	51.57	1935	Jean Baptiste Joseph Fourier (1768–1830)	WGPSN
Fowler	42.59°N 145.27°W	139.52	1970	Alfred Fowler (1868–1940) and Ralph H. Fowler (1889–1944)	WGPSN
Fox	0.47°N 98.14°E	23.97	1973	Philip Fox (1878–1944)	WGPSN
Fra Mauro	6.06°S 16.97°W	96.76	1935	Fra Mauro (d. 1459)	WGPSN
Fracastorius	21.36°S 33.07°E	120.58	1935	Girolamo Fracastoro (1483–1553)	WGPSN
Franck	22.59°N 35.56°E	11.91	1973	James Franck (1882–1964)	WGPSN
Franklin	38.73°N 47.64°E	55.92	1935	Benjamin Franklin (1706–1790)	WGPSN
Franz	16.57°N 40.24°E	25.48	1935	Julius Heinrich Franz (1847–1913)	WGPSN
Fraunhofer	39.52°S 59.06°E	57.75	1935	Joseph von Fraunhofer (1787–1826)	WGPSN
Fredholm	18.37°N 46.55°E	13.39	1976	Erik Ivar Fredholm (1866–1927)	WGPSN
Freud	25.79°N 52.4°W	2.85	1973	Sigmund Freud (1856–1939)	WGPSN
Freundlich	25°N 170.89°E	83.16	1970	Erwin Findlay-Freundlich (1885–1964)	WGPSN
Fridman	12.48°S 126.88°W	101.45	1970	Aleksandr Alexandrovich Fridman (Friedman) (1888–1925)	WGPSN
Froelich	80°N 111.63°W	56.73	1970	Jack E. Froelich (1921–1967)	WGPSN
Frost	37.41°N 118.9°W	78.3	1970	Edwin B. Frost (1866–1935)	WGPSN
Fryxell	21.25°S 101.65°W	17.62	1985	Roald H. Fryxell (1934–1974)	WGPSN
Furnerius	36°S 60.54°E	135.03	1935	Georges Furnier (1595–1652)	WGPSN

back to top
