= Chalonge =

Chalonge may refer to:

== People with the surname ==
- Christian de Chalonge (1937–2025), French film director and screenwriter
- Daniel Chalonge (1895–1977), French astronomer and astrophysicist

== Other uses ==
- 2040 Chalonge, main-belt asteroid
- Chalonge (crater), a crater on the far side of the Moon
