= Bataillard =

Bataillard (French pronunciation: [bataˈjaʁ]), and at various points also Bataillart, is a French surname which originated in Eastern France during the mid-14th century. It is now held by about 500 households worldwide.

The name was first used unofficially by Jean Batailly, knight of Marchamp, who in 1358 took possession of La Farge at Propiere. 'Bataillard' (or Bataillart) was thus first used by Jean Batailly de Marchamp as a nom de guerre, probably to reflect his status as a knight, but also as an adaptation of the pre-existing name Batailly.

Over the next few years, he would officially incorporate the name (Jean de Marchamp dit Bataillard, 1365); and in 1366, Guichard de Verneys notes that his daughter Jaquette was married to Jean de M. dit Bataillard. Two years later, he would remove Marchamp from his name, thus giving rise to the first true Bataillard on 17 September 1368. This omission was not continued by his immediate descendants, however, who chose to keep their nominal ties to the noble Marchamp family.

The engagement of the damoiseau (not yet knight) Jean Bataillard dit Marchamp, is recorded to have taken place on 1 September 1374, and so from this it is inferred that he was the son of the chevalier Jean Bataillard.

In December 1441, through an old feudal agreement, La Farge was relinquished from Jean de Marchamp dit Bataillard (probably the son of the former, and the grandson of Jean Bataillard), and given to Ardouin Marchamp. This seems to be the last member of the original Marchamp family who chose not to adopt the name Bataillard. The death of Ardouin Marchamp in 1451 marked the end of Marchamp in the Bataillard line, and in 1459 La Farge was given to Thomas de Verneys (a close descendant of Guichard de Verneys, father-in-law of Jean de M. dit Bataillard (Jean Bataillard)).

Throughout the 15th century, the Bataillards maintained a political standing in the entire Savoie region: the presumed cousin of Jean Bataillard, Guichard de Marchamp, was appointed chancellor of Savoie in 1414.

Since this time, most Bataillards have remained in the Savoie and surrounding region, and a significant number now reside in neighbouring regions of Switzerland.

The coat of arms of the family are two-fold.

1. 1552 (Romanel) A sinople background, bearing a chevron and three clubs, all in gold.

2. 1618 (Romanel) A green or gold background, bearing an armoured arm holding a sword, bordeau-coloured. The scheme and colours changed gradually in different branches of the family throughout the 17th and 18th centuries, but the basic motif of a sword-bearing armoured arm is consistent.

The family motto, generally linked to the second coat of arms, is given as "Savoir vaincre et rester bon" (Know how to win and remain good)
