= Dörffel =

Dörffel may refer to:

- Alfred Dörffel (1821–1905), German pianist and music publisher
- Georg Dörffel (1914–1944), German Luftwaffe pilot
- Georg Samuel Dörffel (1643–1688), German astronomer and namesake of a lunar crater and a minor planet
