= Perkin (crater) =

Crater on the Moon

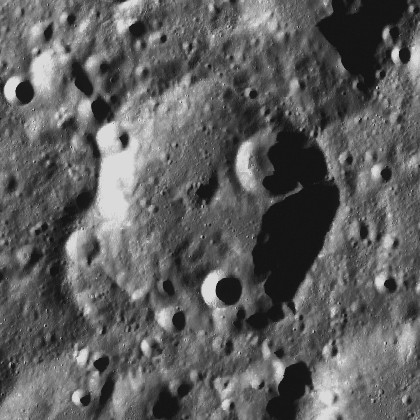
- LRO image
- Coordinates: 47.02°N 175.73°E
- Diameter: 62.48 km (38.82 mi)
- Depth: Unknown
- Colongitude: 177° at sunrise
- Eponym: Richard S. Perkin

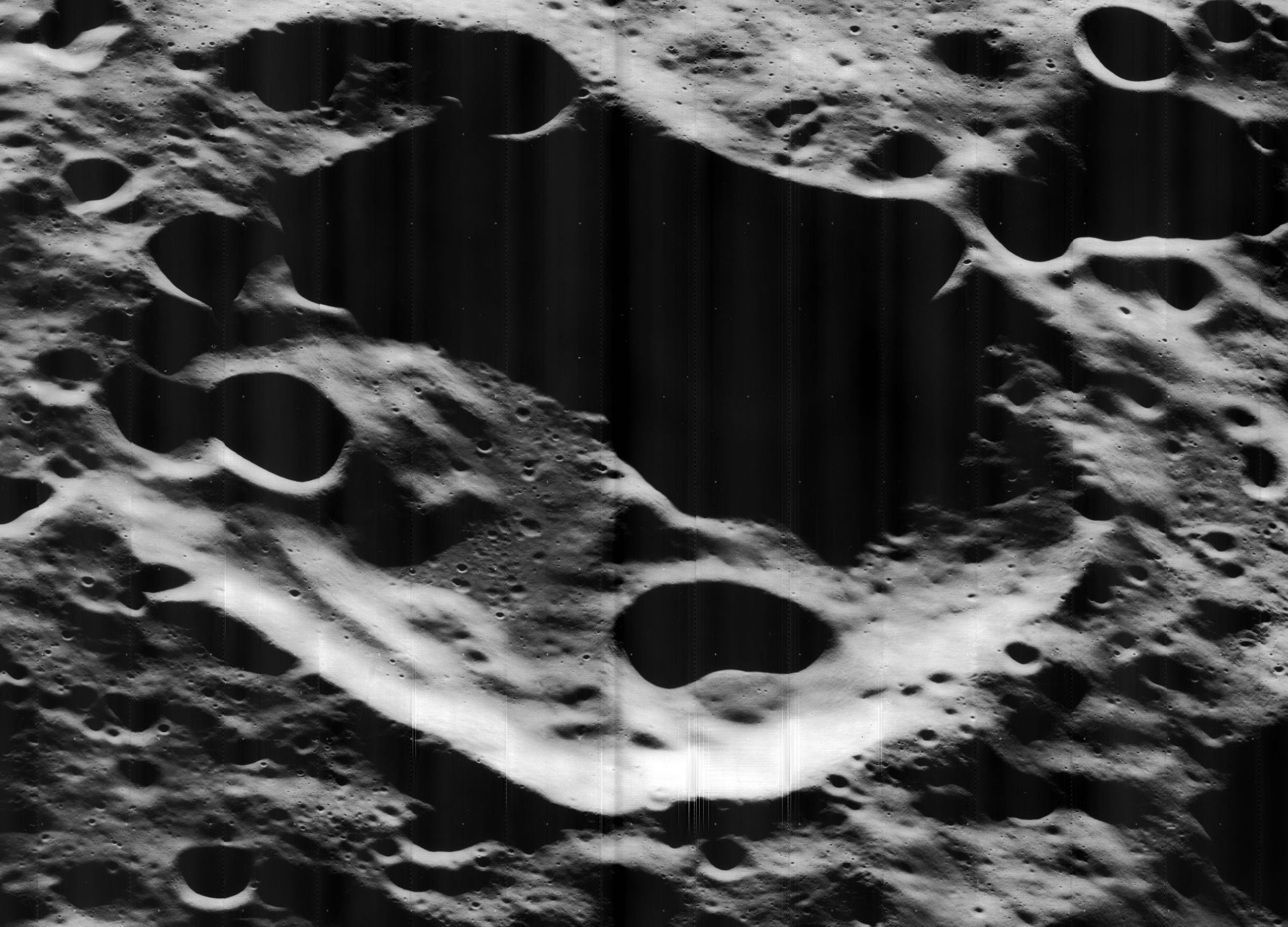
Oblique Lunar Orbiter 5 image, facing west

Perkin is a lunar impact crater that is located in the northern hemisphere on the Moon's far side. Immediately to the north is the larger crater Debye. Just to the southeast is the somewhat smaller cater Guillaume, and to the west-southwest lies Dunér. To the northwest of Perkin is the large walled plain called D'Alembert.

This is a worn and eroded crater formation with an outer rim that has been reshaped by several subsequent impacts. Laid along the inner wall to the east-northeast is a small crater. Small craterlets lie along the southern inner wall and the northwestern rim. Several smaller craterlets cut across the rim along the southwest and north.

Prior to formal naming by the IAU in 1970, Perkin was called Crater 72.
