= Cooper (crater) =

Lunar impact crater

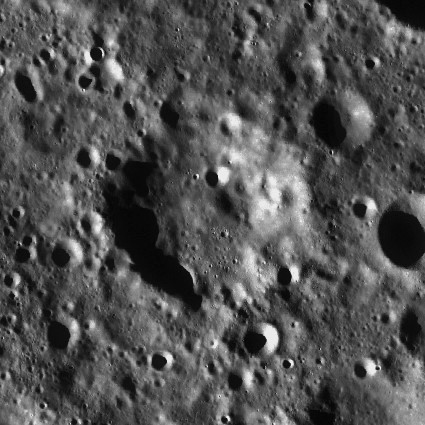
- Coordinates: 52.9°N 175.6°E
- Diameter: 51.87 km (32.23 mi)
- Depth: Unknown
- Colongitude: 174° at sunrise
- Formation: Pre-Nectarian
- Eponym: John Cobb Cooper

Cooper is a degraded lunar impact crater that is located in the northern hemisphere on the far side of the Moon. It lies to the east of the large walled plain D'Alembert, and west-southwest of the crater Chappell.

This crater formation dates to the Pre-Nectarian period of the lunar geologic timescale. It has been heavily worn and degraded by impact erosion. Surface striations to the rim and surroundings come from the ejecta blanket of Rowland to the northeast. Little remains of the original rim of Cooper, although its form can still be traced across the surface. Multiple small craters lie across the rim and inner wall, leaving a ring-shaped formation of ridges in the lunar terrain. The interior floor is slightly less rough than the surrounding surface, with a cluster of small craterlets near the northeast inner wall.

This crater is named after American jurist John Cobb Cooper (1887–1967), who was a pioneer of international aerospace law. Its designation was officially adopted by the International Astronomical Union in 1970.

== Satellite craters ==
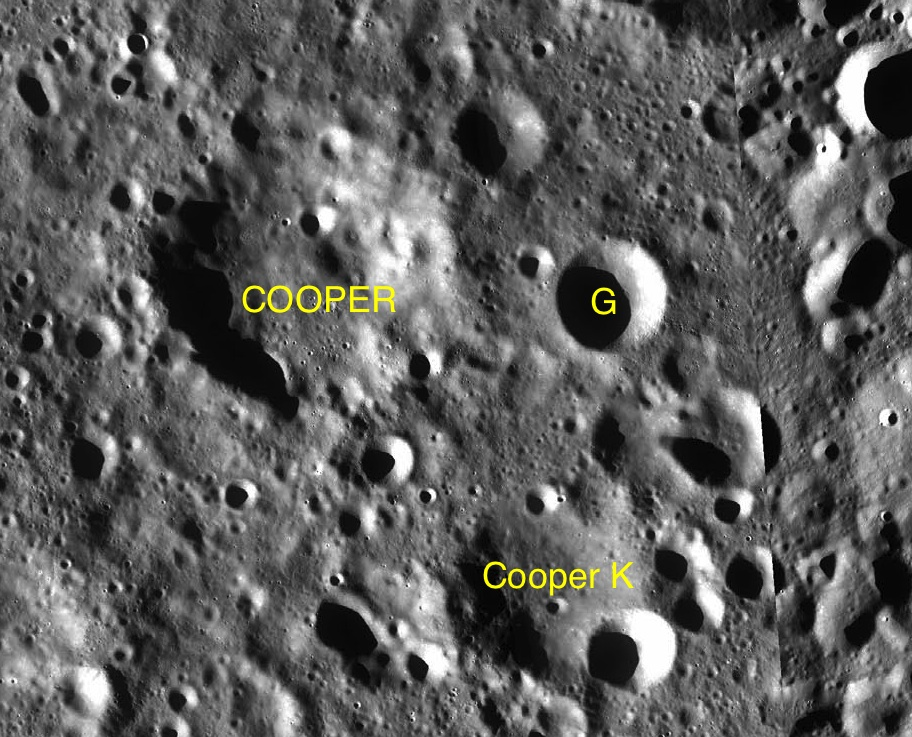
Satellite features

By convention these features are identified on lunar maps by placing the letter on the side of the crater midpoint that is closest to Cooper.

Cooper	Latitude	Longitude	Diameter
G	52.6° N	178.5° E	20 km
K	51.1° N	178.1° E	30 km
