= John Cobb Cooper =

American lawyer & executive (1887–1967)

John Cobb Cooper Jr. (September 18, 1887 – July 22, 1967) was an American lawyer, airline executive and presidential advisor.

After graduating from Princeton University, he joined the Florida Bar and later the US Navy. Post World War I, he became a member of the Naval Reserve and eventually a Lieutenant-Commander. Cooper held positions such as Editor-in-Chief of the Florida State Bar Association Law Journal, vice president of Pan American Airways, and a consultant to the US President's Air Policy Commission.

In 1951, he founded the Institute of Air & Space Law at McGill University, where he also served as a professor. Known as the "Father of Air Space Law," Cooper wrote The Right to Fly and was the legal counsel to the International Air Transport Association (IATA). His contributions earned him various awards and honors, including an honorary Doctor of Laws from Princeton University and a lunar crater named after him.

== Early life and education ==
Cooper was born in Jacksonville, Florida, to John Cobb and Mary Coldwell Cooper. After graduating from Lawrenceville School in New Jersey, he was educated at Princeton University and received an AB degree in 1909.

== Career ==
In 1911 was admitted to the Florida Bar. He was a delegate to the Democratic National Conventions in 1916 and 1924. In 1917 he joined the US Navy, and reached the rank of lieutenant by the end of World War I. He married Martha Helen Marvel in 1918 and the couple had three children: two girls and a boy. A year later he was relieved from active service and became a member of the Naval Reserve. In 1921 he became Lieutenant-Commander.

From 1927 to 1934 he was Editor-in-Chief of the Florida State Bar Association Law Journal. He was appointed to the International Technical Committee of Legal Aerial Experts, 1932–1934. He became vice president of Pan American Airways 1934–1945, serving on the board of directors 1944–1946. In such capacity, he was elected as a member of the first executive committee of the International Air Transport Association in 1945. In 1947 he served as a consultant to the US President's Air Policy Commission. He was a fellow at the Institute for Advanced Study in Princeton, 1945–1950. In 1951, Cooper founded the Institute of Air & Space Law at McGill University in Montreal, which had become the home of the International Civil Aviation Organization, the UN body charged with safety in air navigation. In 1952 he was awarded his LLD from McGill University. From 1951 to 1957 he was professor of International Air Law at McGill University, becoming the first director of the Institute of International Air Law, after which he was named professor emeritus.

He was the author of the book The Right to Fly and pioneered legal thought on air/space rights of man-made satellites in orbit, commencing with the launch of Sputnik in October 1957 when asked by President Eisenhower to render a legal opinion on "flyover rights" when Sputnik was orbiting over the United States. His honorary doctorate from his alma mater, Princeton University, declared him the "Father of Air Space Law".

He was the legal counsel to the International Air Transport Association (IATA) from the early 1950s through to the end of his life.

He was a pioneer in the field of international law as it applied to air and space. He wrote the first article on the topic of space ownership, "High Altitude Flight and National Sovereignty", in 1951.

His younger brother was movie producer Merian C. Cooper, perhaps most famous for the creation of the movie King Kong in 1933, and whose position as a director of Pan Am was responsible for recommending his older brother for the position of Pan Am's legal counsel and Vice President.

He flew with Charles Lindbergh, a consultant for Pan Am, in small aircraft on site surveys to select sites in Ireland (Shannon) and France (Orly) for airports as Pan Am's services overseas increased.

== Awards and honors ==
- Honorary Doctor of Laws, Princeton University, 1960.
- The crater Cooper on the far side of the Moon is named after him.

== See also ==
- Aviation law
- Space law
