= Guillaume (crater) =

Crater on the Moon

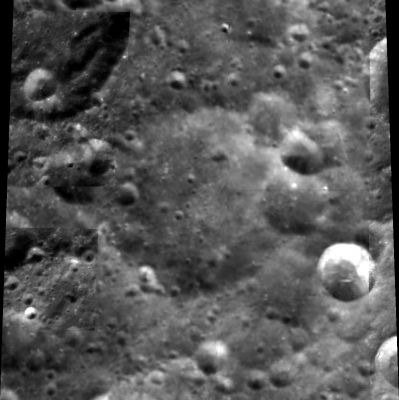
- Clementine mosaic
- Coordinates: 45.16°N 173.38°W
- Diameter: 56.75 km (35.26 mi)
- Depth: Unknown
- Colongitude: 174° at sunrise
- Eponym: Charles É. Guillaume

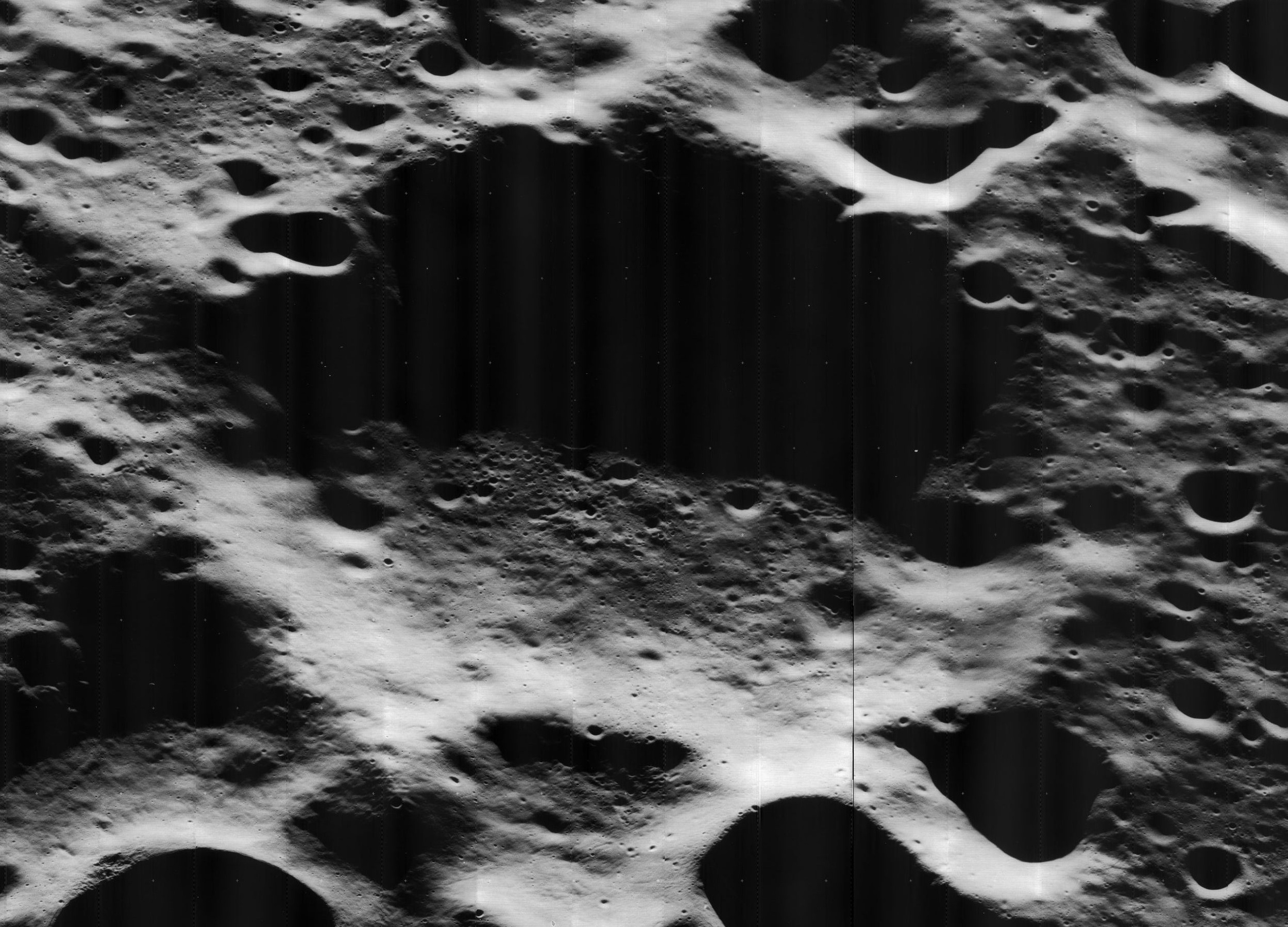
Oblique Lunar Orbiter 5 image, facing west

Guillaume is an old lunar impact crater on the Moon's northern hemisphere, and is located on the far side relative to the Earth. It lies just to the southeast of the slightly larger crater Perkin. This is a worn and eroded formation, with features that have been softened and rounded over time. A cluster of small craters covers most of the northeastern rim. Several small craterlets lie along the edge to the south and west. The bowl-like interior is nearly featureless, with only a few small craterlets to mark the surface.

Prior to formal naming by the IAU in 1979, Guillaume was called Crater 73.

== Satellite craters ==
By convention, these features are identified on lunar maps by placing the letter on the side of the crater midpoint that is closest to Guillaume.

Guillaume	Latitude	Longitude	Diameter
B	47.3° N	172.6° W	26 km
D	46.6° N	170.5° W	26 km
F	45.4° N	169.4° W	33 km
J	43.7° N	170.6° W	17 km
