= Easley (crater) =

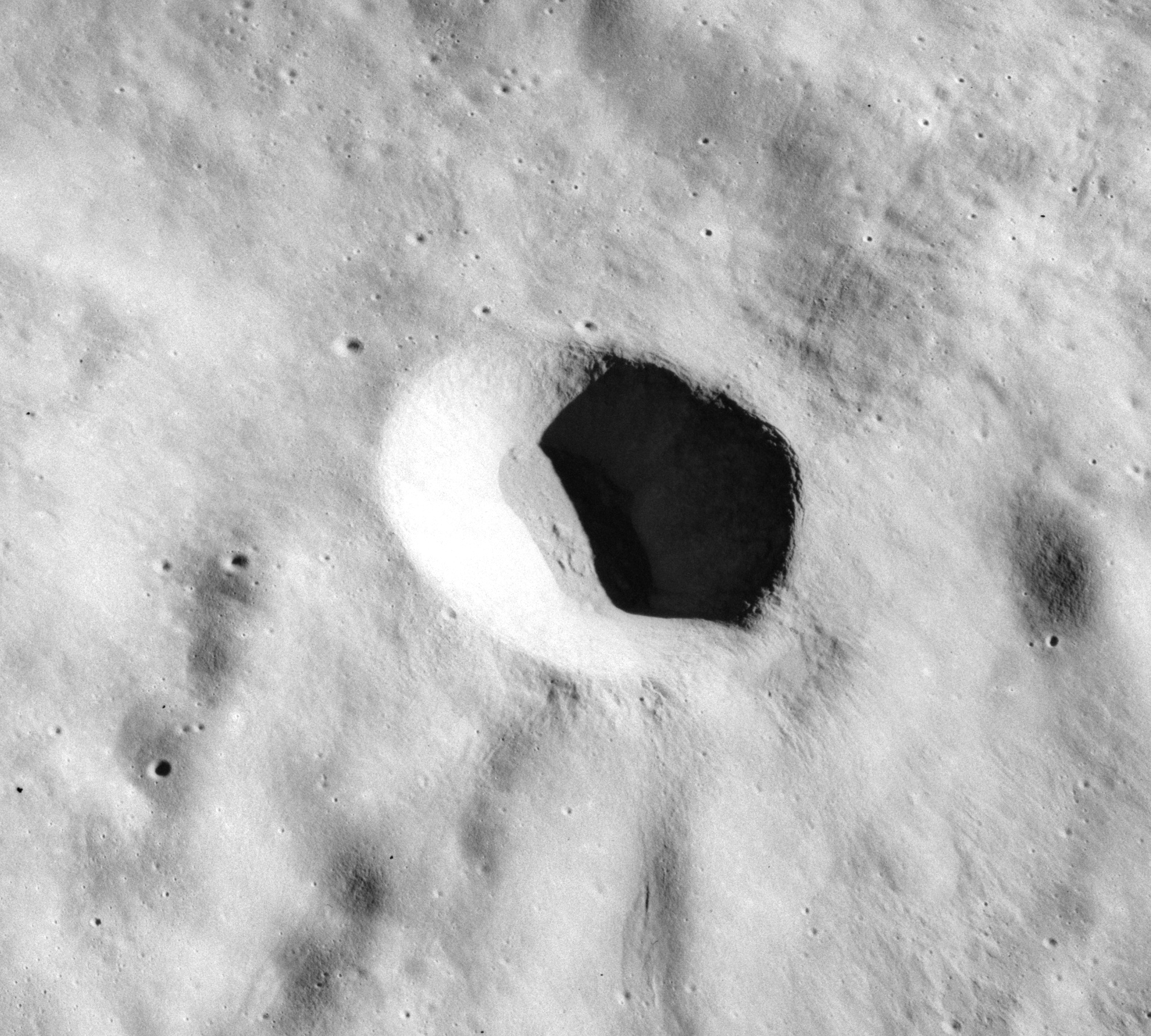
- Oblique Apollo 15 image
- Coordinates: 23.69°S 87.97°E
- Diameter: 9 km
- Depth: Unknown
- Eponym: Annie J. Easley

Easley is a small lunar impact crater that is located on the southern hemisphere on the near side of the Moon, east of the large crater Humboldt and west of Curie.

The crater's name was approved by the International Astronomical Union on 1 February 2021. It is named after the American computer scientist, mathematician, and rocket scientist Annie J. Easley (1933-2011).

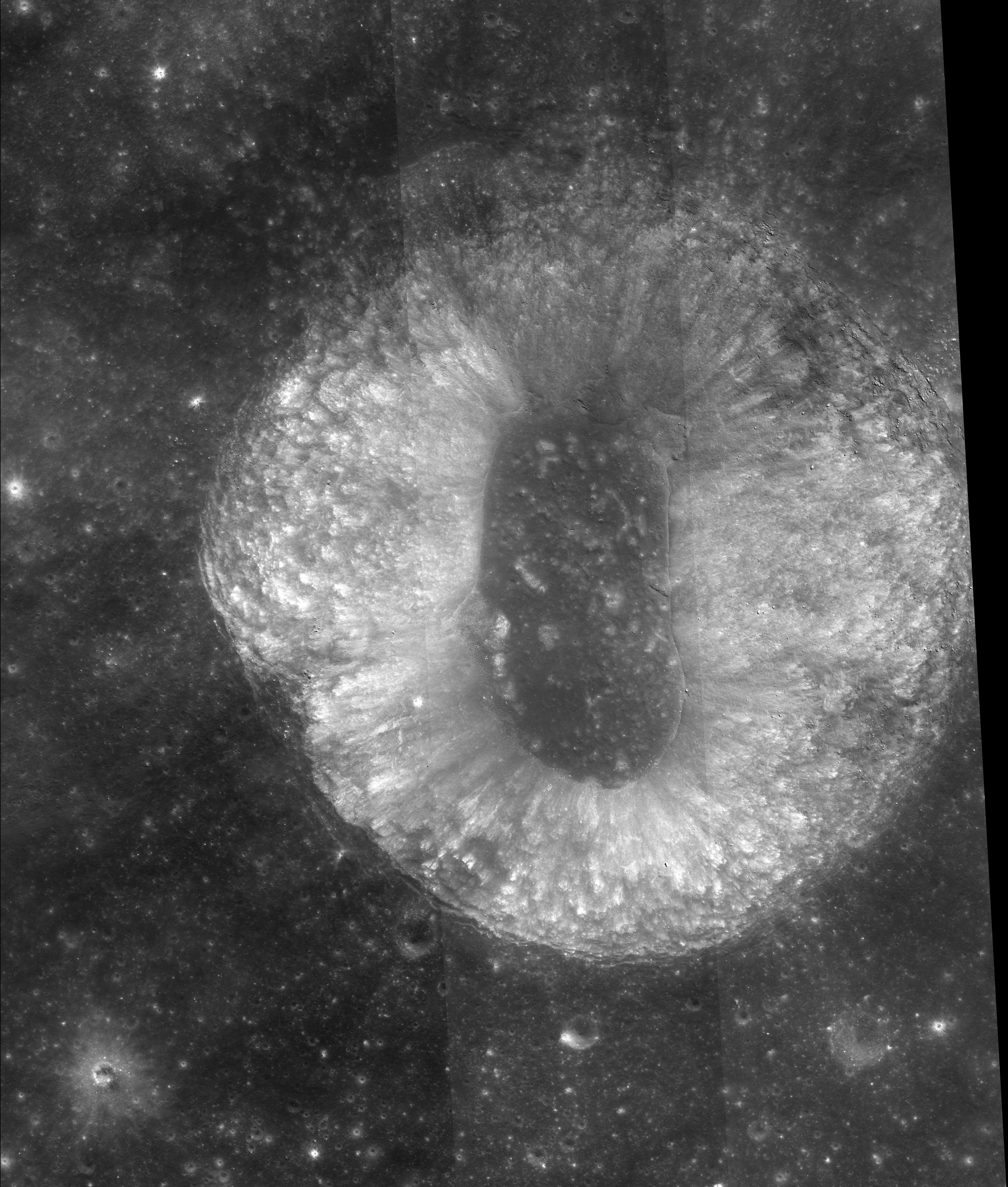
LRO mosaic

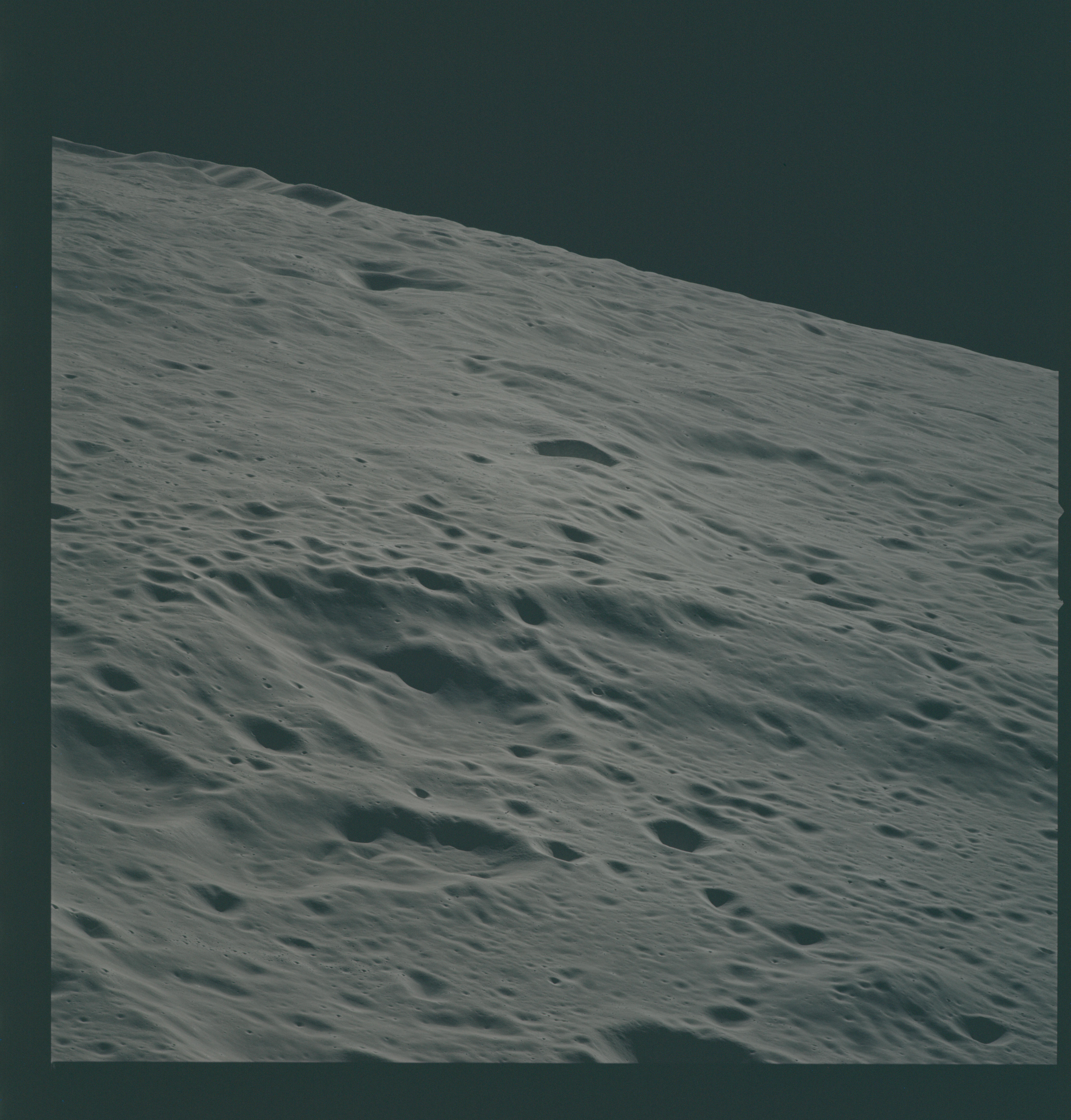
Easley is at the center of this oblique view from Apollo 15. The west rim of Curie crater is in the foreground.
