= Dunér (crater) =

Crater on the Moon

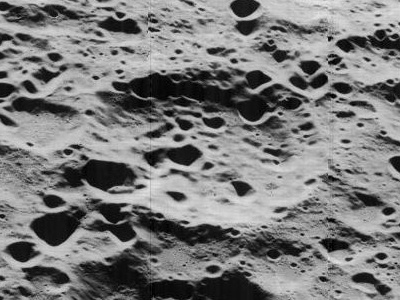
- Oblique Lunar Orbiter 5 image, facing west
- Coordinates: 44.68°N 179.46°E
- Diameter: 65.07 km (40.43 mi)
- Depth: Unknown
- Colongitude: 181° at sunrise
- Eponym: Nils C. Dunér

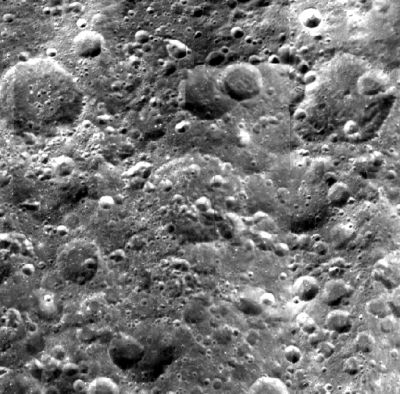
Clementine mosaic with Dunér at center

Dunér is a degraded lunar impact crater that is located in the northern hemisphere on the far side of the Moon. It lies to the southeast of the crater Chernyshev, and west-southwest of the Perkin–Debye crater pair.

This crater has been heavily battered by multiple small impacts, leaving a barely surviving outer rim that forms little more than a circular rise in the surface. The interior is in similar condition, and small craters cover many parts of the crater. The most notable impacts consist of a chain of overlapping small craters that run from near the midpoint and cross the southeastern rim. This chain is greater in length than the diameter of Dunér.

This formation is named after Swedish astronomer Nils Christoffer Dunér (1839-1914). Its designation was officially adopted by the International Astronomical Union in 1970. Previously, Dunér was identified as Crater 69.

== Satellite craters ==
By convention these features are identified on lunar maps by placing the letter on the side of the crater midpoint that is closest to Dunér.

Dunér	Latitude	Longitude	Diameter
A	47.7° N	179.7° E	38 km
