= Evans (crater) =

Crater on the Moon

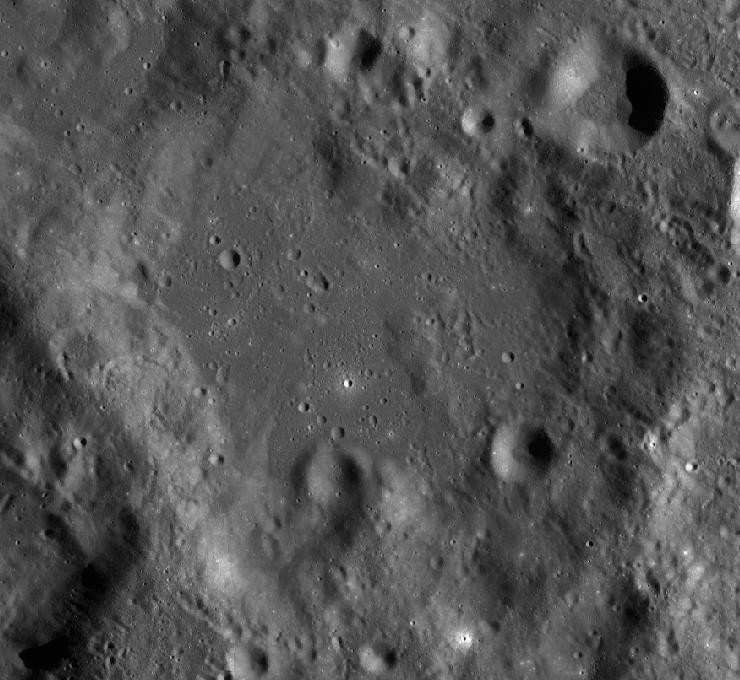
- LRO WAC image
- Coordinates: 9.5°S 133.5°W
- Diameter: 69.40 km (43.12 mi)
- Depth: Unknown
- Colongitude: 134° at sunrise
- Eponym: Arthur J. Evans

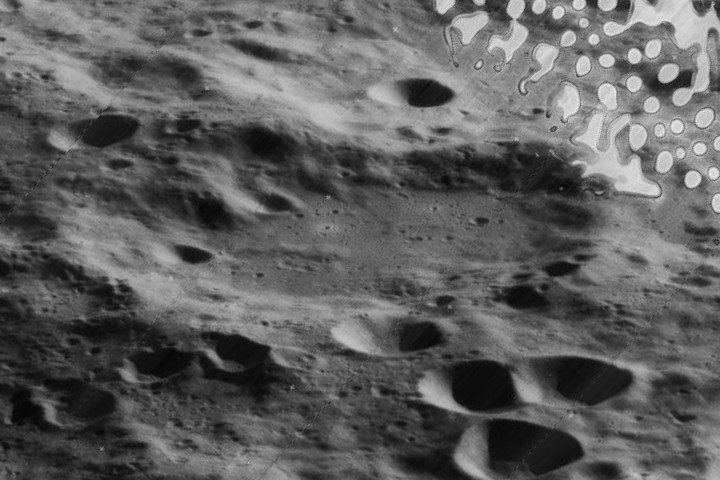
A view of Evans from Lunar Orbiter 5, facing west

Evans is the remnant of a lunar impact crater that is located on the far side of the Moon. It lies to the south-southwest of the immense walled plain named Hertzsprung, and is located within that impact basin's broad skirt of ejecta. This material has overflowed the northern rim of Evans and the northern part of the interior floor. The southern rim is not as heavily damaged, although it is irregular, eroded, and overlain by a pair of small craterlets. The most intact part of the rim is the southeastern section.

This formation is named after the British archaeologist Arthur J. Evans (1851-1941). Its designation was officially adopted by the International Astronomical Union in 1970.

== Satellite craters ==
By convention these features are identified on lunar maps by placing the letter on the side of the crater midpoint that is closest to Evans.

Evans	Latitude	Longitude	Diameter
Q	11.2° S	136.4° W	137 km
