= Doerfel (crater) =

Lunar impact crater

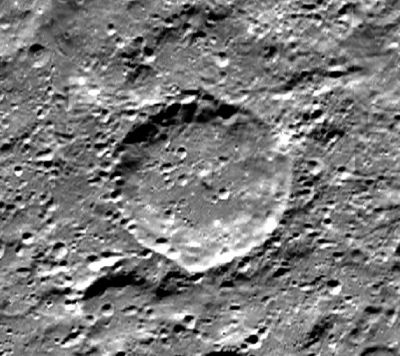
- Clementine image
- Coordinates: 69.1°S 107.9°W
- Diameter: 68.63 km (42.64 mi)
- Depth: 3.39 km (2.11 mi)
- Colongitude: 111° at sunrise
- Formation: Upper Imbrian
- Eponym: Georg S. Doerfel

Doerfel is a lunar impact crater that is located in the vicinity of the southern pole, just on the far side of the Moon. This formation has a diameter of 69 km and a depth of 3.4 km. It lies approximately midway between the large crater Hausen to the east-northeast and the even larger Zeeman to the southwest.

On the lunar geologic timescale, this formation dates to the Upper Imbrian period. The outer wall of Doerfel retains much of its original form, but it has been rounded and eroded by a history of subsequent bombardment. Many tiny craterlets lie on or near the rim, especially along the western edge. There is a slight outward extrusion in the southern rim, and the opposite, northern rim appears somewhat jumbled and degraded. Doerfel's interior is also marked by several tiny craterlets in the otherwise relatively flat surface. There is a minor rise near the midpoint.

This formation is named after German astronomer Georg S. Doerfel (1643-1688). His name was originally applied to a lunar mountain range, Montes Doerfel, by German astronomer Johann H. Schröter in 1791. In 1971, this range was found not to be clearly identified, so the name was removed. The modern designation was formally adopted by the International Astronomical Union in 1985.

== Satellite craters ==
By convention these features are identified on lunar maps by placing the letter on the side of the crater midpoint that is closest to Doerfel.

| Doerfel | Latitude | Longitude | Diameter |
|---|---|---|---|
| R | 71.3° S | 119.4° W | 32 km |
| S | 69.9° S | 119.6° W | 32 km |
| U | 68.8° S | 117.2° W | 34 km |
| Y | 67.8° S | 108.8° W | 68 km |
