= Deseilligny (crater) =

Crater on the Moon

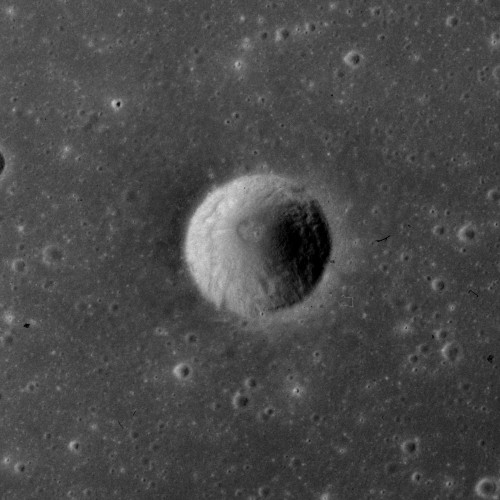
- Apollo 15 image
- Coordinates: 21.1°N 20.6°E
- Diameter: 6.01 km (3.73 mi)
- Depth: 1.25 km (0.78 mi)
- Colongitude: 340° at sunrise
- Formation: Eratosthenian
- Eponym: Jules Deseilligny

Deseilligny is a small lunar impact crater in the southern part of the Mare Serenitatis. It is located to the east-southeast of the crater Bessel. On the lunar geologic timescale, this formation dates to the Eratosthenian period. Deseilligny is a bowl-shaped crater with a low rim. It is otherwise undistinguished and displays no apparent layering.

This crater is named after French selenographer Jules Deseilligny (1868-1918). His name was incorporated into lunar nomenclature by Greek-French selenographer Félix C. Lamèch in 1934. Its designation was formally adopted by the International Astronomical Union in 1935.

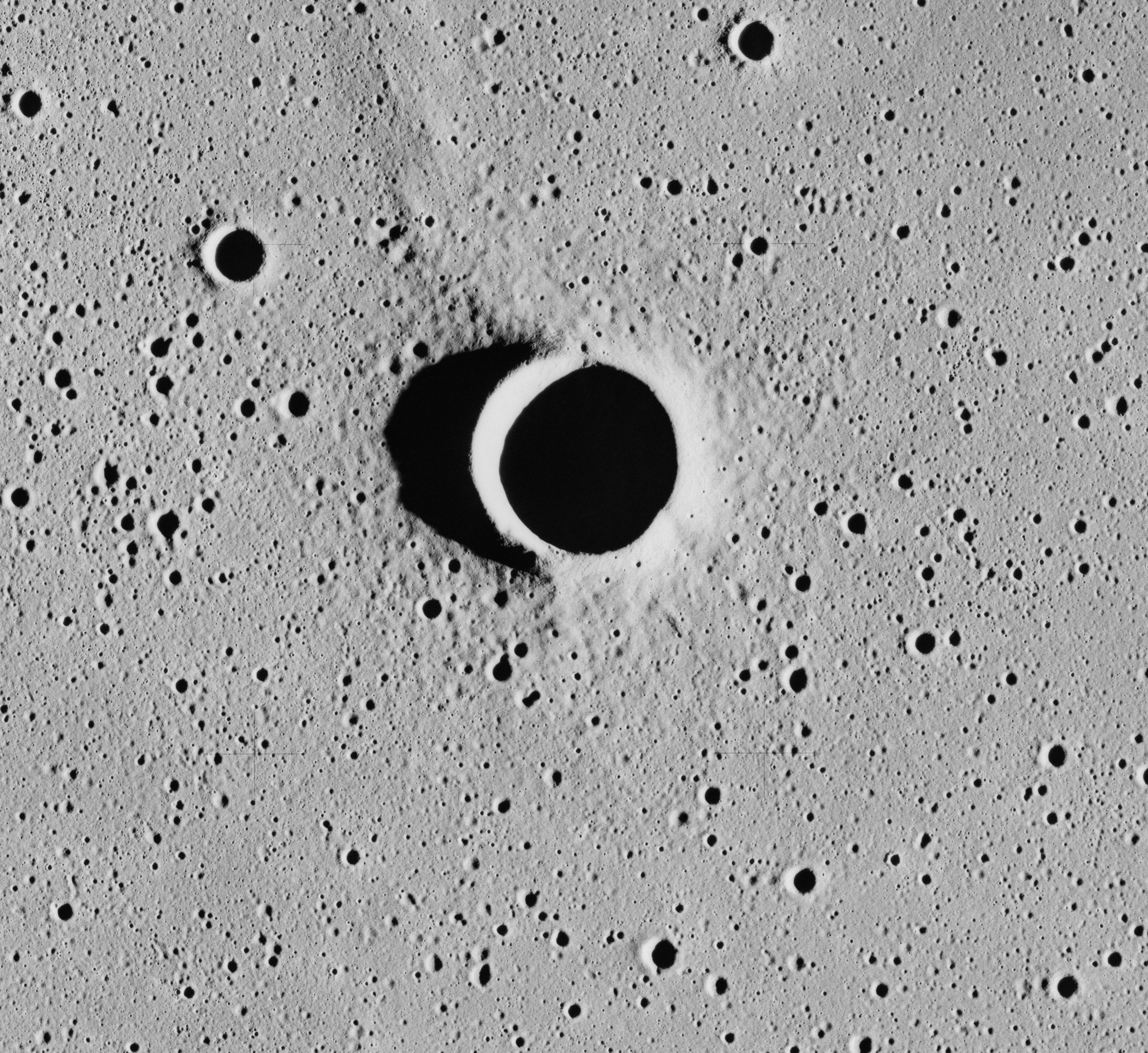
Apollo 17 image at low sun angle

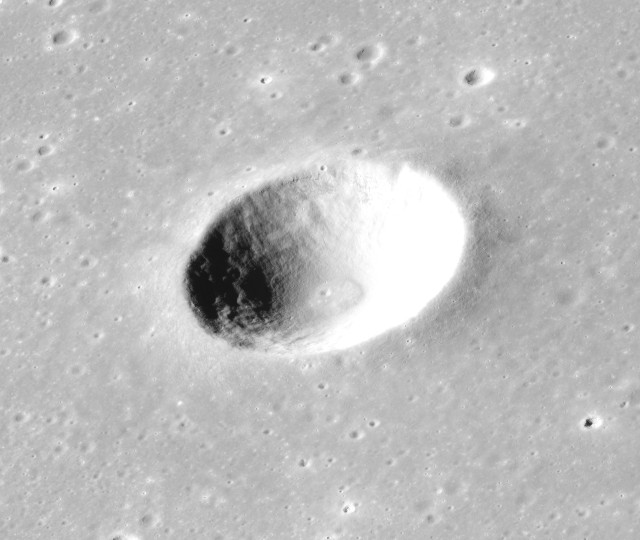
Oblique Apollo 15 image
