= Chappell (crater) =

Lunar impact crater

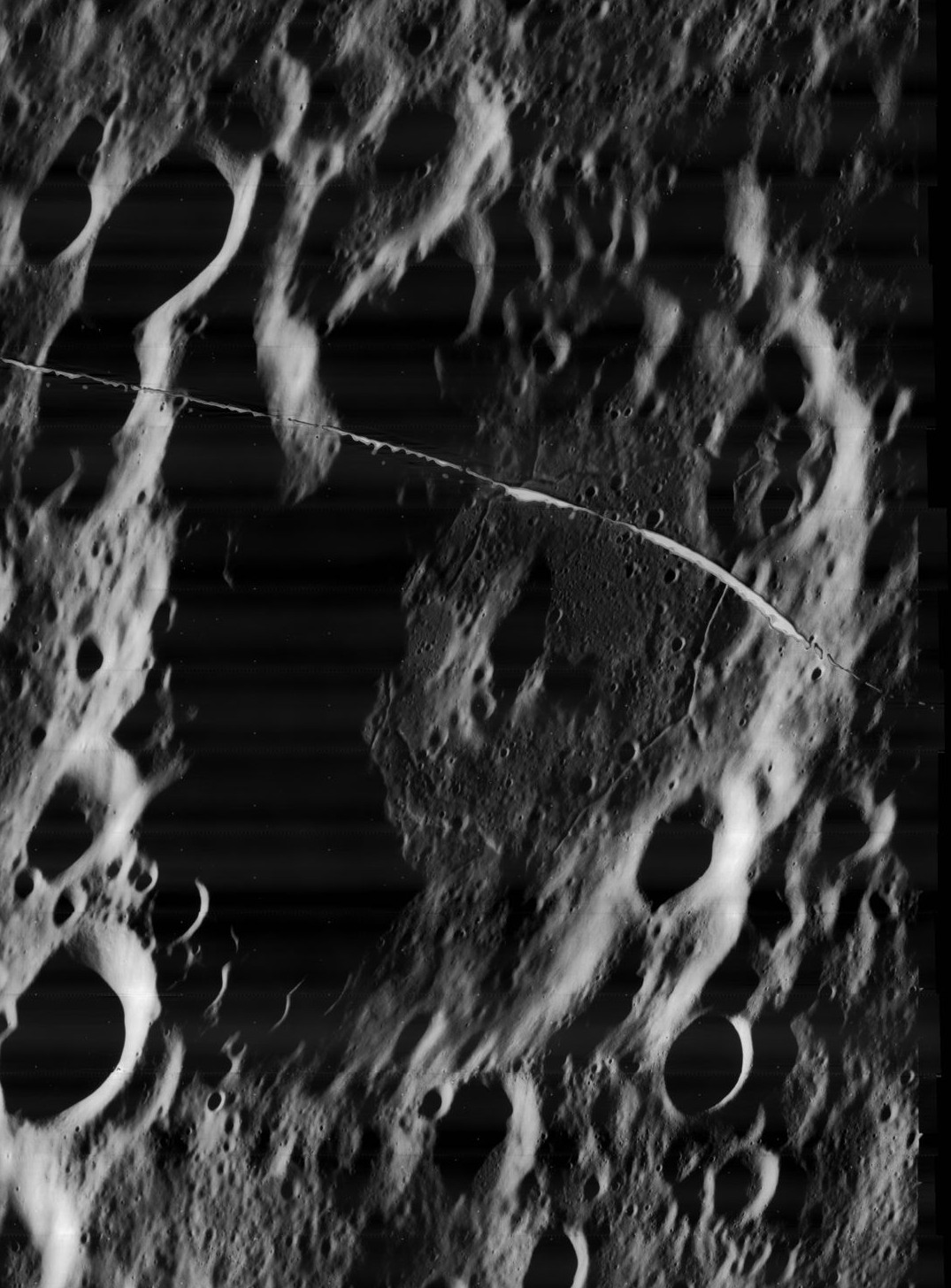
- Oblique Lunar Orbiter 5 image (streak is blemish on original)
- Coordinates: 54.53°N 176.77°W
- Diameter: 73.92 km (45.93 mi)
- Depth: Unknown
- Colongitude: 179° at sunrise
- Formation: Pre-Nectarian
- Eponym: James F. Chappell

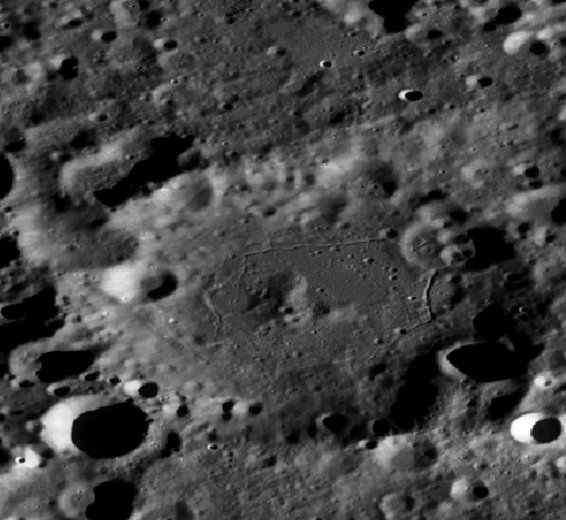
LRO map-projected image

Chappell is a degraded lunar impact crater on the far side of the Moon, in the northern hemisphere just to the north of the crater Debye. To the northwest is the smaller but fresher crater Tsinger.

This formation dates to the Pre-Nectarian period on the lunar geologic timescale. It is in a heavily bombarded section of the surface, and much of its outer rim is overlain by smaller craters. The northern rim in particular has been almost completely disintegrated, while small craters also overlie the rim to the northwest and southeast. What remains of the rim forms a rounded, somewhat irregular edge to the crater depression.

In contrast, the interior floor is not notably marked by impacts. The interior surface is more level compared to the rugged terrain surrounding it. Near the floor's midpoint is a low, rounded central ridge, and surrounding it are a series of linear and arcuate fractures forming a nearly-complete ring around the central peak.

The crater is named after American astronomer James F. Chappell (1891–1964). Its designation was formally adopted by the IAU in 1970.

== Satellite craters ==
By convention these features are identified on lunar maps by placing the letter on the side of the crater midpoint that is closest to Chappell.

| Chappell | Latitude | Longitude | Diameter |
|---|---|---|---|
| E | 55.8° N | 171.5° W | 59 km |
| T | 54.8° N | 178.9° E | 28 km |
