= Jules Alfred Pierrot Deseilligny =

French selenographer

Jules Alfred Pierrot Deseilligny (1868–1918) was a French selenographer. He was a grandson of Eugène Schneider through his mother.

The crater Deseilligny on the Moon is named after him.
