= Sandra Johnson =

American electrical engineer

Sandra Kay Johnson (also published as Sandra Johnson Baylor) is a Japanese-born American electrical engineer, the first African-American woman to earn a doctorate in electrical engineering at Rice University, and the first black woman in the IBM Academy of Technology.

== Early life and education ==
Johnson was born in Japan, where her father was serving in the United States Air Force; she grew up in Lake Charles, Louisiana. Her father died in a traffic accident when she was two, and she was raised by her mother and extended family. Her family also includes several other technologists: "two electrical engineers, a microbiologist, and a physicist".

After a summer program at Southern University, a historically black university in Baton Rouge, Louisiana, Johnson was given a scholarship to Southern, where she majored in electrical engineering, graduating in 1982. She earned a master's degree at Stanford University. Originally intending to finish her education there and then work as an engineer, she was inspired to go further by meeting Stanford emeritus professor William Shockley and reacting to his racist beliefs about the intellectual inferiority of African-Americans.

She went to Rice University for doctoral study in electrical engineering, advised by Fayé Briggs, an immigrant from Nigeria. She completed her Ph.D. in 1988 with the dissertation The effects of cache coherence on the performance of parallel PDE algorithms in multiprocessor systems. In doing so, she became the first African-American woman to earn a doctorate in electrical engineering at Rice.

== Career and later life ==
After completing her doctorate, Johnson became a researcher for IBM Research at its Thomas J. Watson Research Center in Yorktown Heights, New York. At IBM, she worked on parallel and shared memory systems, parallel I/O, networked computing, and the Vesta Parallel File System, and became part of the Deep Blue chess computer project. By 2001, she had become a manager of a web–database integration team in IBM's Silicon Valley Lab in San Jose, California, and in 2011 she shifted from research and development to become a business development executive and later Chief technology officer of IBM Central, East and West Africa, and was based in Nairobi, Kenya.

Johnson was a member of the IBM Academy of Technology, which consists of the top 1% of IBM’s over 250,000 technical professionals. She has received numerous technical and professional awards and has over 40 patents issued and pending. She has authored and co-authored over 80 publications, is Editor-in-Chief of the book Performance Tuning for Linux Servers, and is author of Inspirational Nuggets, Inspirational Nuggets Too, GREGORY: The Life of a Lupus Warrior, and Soft Power for the Journey: The Life of a STEM Trailblazer.

After retiring from IBM in 2014, Johnson founded consulting firm SKJ Visioneering and personal financial technology firm Global Mobile Finance, Inc., with the goal of making it easier for people to transfer money internationally, especially within Africa.

== Recognition ==
Johnson was elected to the IBM Academy of Technology in 2002, which consists of the top 1% of IBM’s over 250,000 technical professionals, the first black woman in the academy. She was elected as an IBM Fellow in 2006. In the same year, she was named as an IEEE Fellow, "for contributions to the design and performance evaluation of computer systems". She was also recognized as an ACM Distinguished Engineer in 2006.
