= Epimenides (crater) =

Crater on the Moon

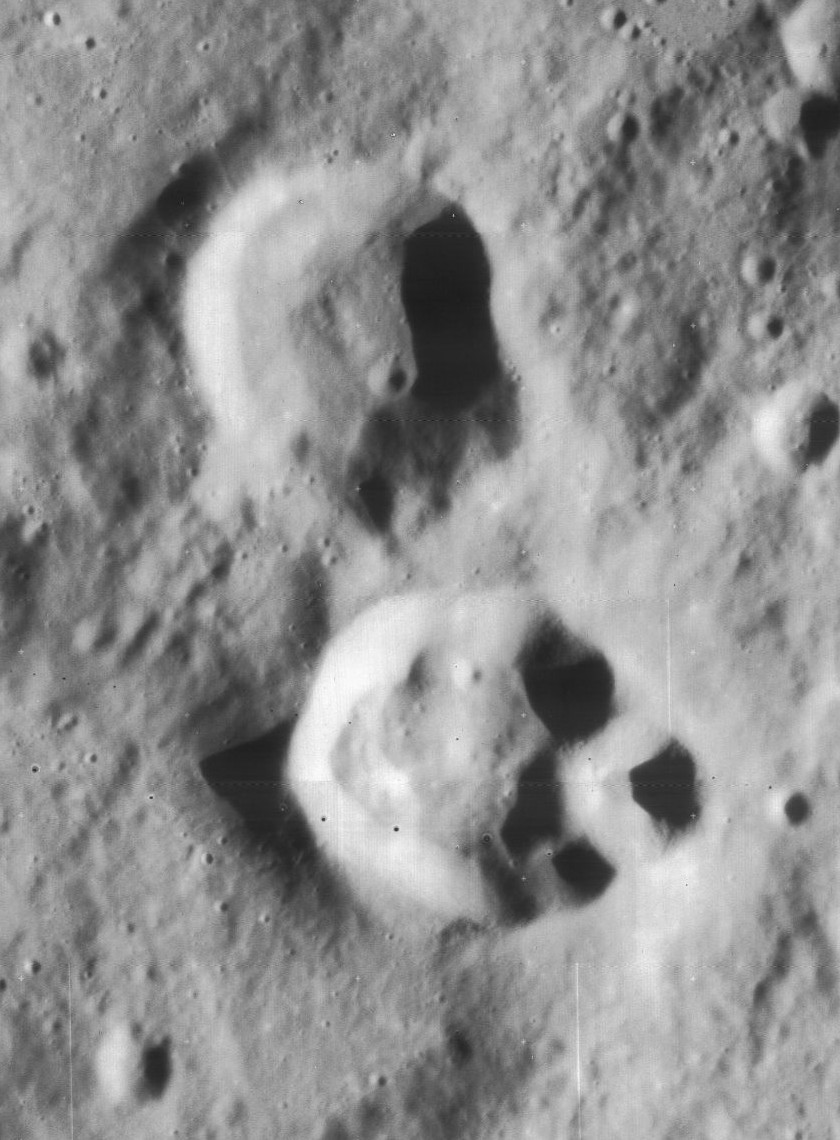
- Lunar Orbiter 4 image, with Epimenides at top and Epimenides S at bottom
- Coordinates: 40.9°S 30.2°W
- Diameter: 22.56 km (14.02 mi)
- Depth: 2.0 km (1.2 mi)
- Colongitude: 30° at sunrise
- Eponym: Epimenides

Epimenides is a lunar impact crater on the southwestern part of the Moon's near side, just to the east of the oddly shaped crater Hainzel. Just to the north and northeast is Lacus Timoris, a small lunar mare. The crater is 27 kilometers in diameter and 2,000 meters deep. It may be from the Pre-Nectarian period, 4.55 to 3.92 billion years ago.

The outer rim of this crater is roughly circular, but uneven due to the irregular terrain in which it is located. The southern edge is distended where a smaller formation has overlapped the side. The interior floor is relatively level and featureless. About five kilometers southeast from the crater's southern edge is the satellite crater Epimenides S, which is almost the same size as the main crater and is nearly circular, except for a craterlet making an indentation in its eastern side.

The crater is named for the 6th-century BC Cretan poet and prophet Epimenides (unknown–fl. 596 B.C.). His name was included with the lunar nomenclature of German astronomer Johann F. J. Schmidt. Its designation was officially adopted by the International Astronomical Union in 1935.

== Satellite craters ==
By convention these features are identified on lunar maps by placing the letter on the side of the crater midpoint that is closest to Epimenides.

Epimenides	Latitude	Longitude	Diameter
A	43.2° S	30.1° W	15 km
B	41.6° S	28.8° W	10 km
C	42.3° S	27.5° W	4 km
S	41.6° S	29.3° W	26 km
