= James Chappell (astronomer) =

American astronomer and photographer

James F. Chappell (1891–1964) was an American astronomer and photographer.

He worked at the Lick Observatory where he performed photography of the Moon. He is noted for the development of special photographic techniques for use in astronomy.

The crater Chappell on the Moon is named after him.
