= Annie Easley =

American mathematician and rocket scientist

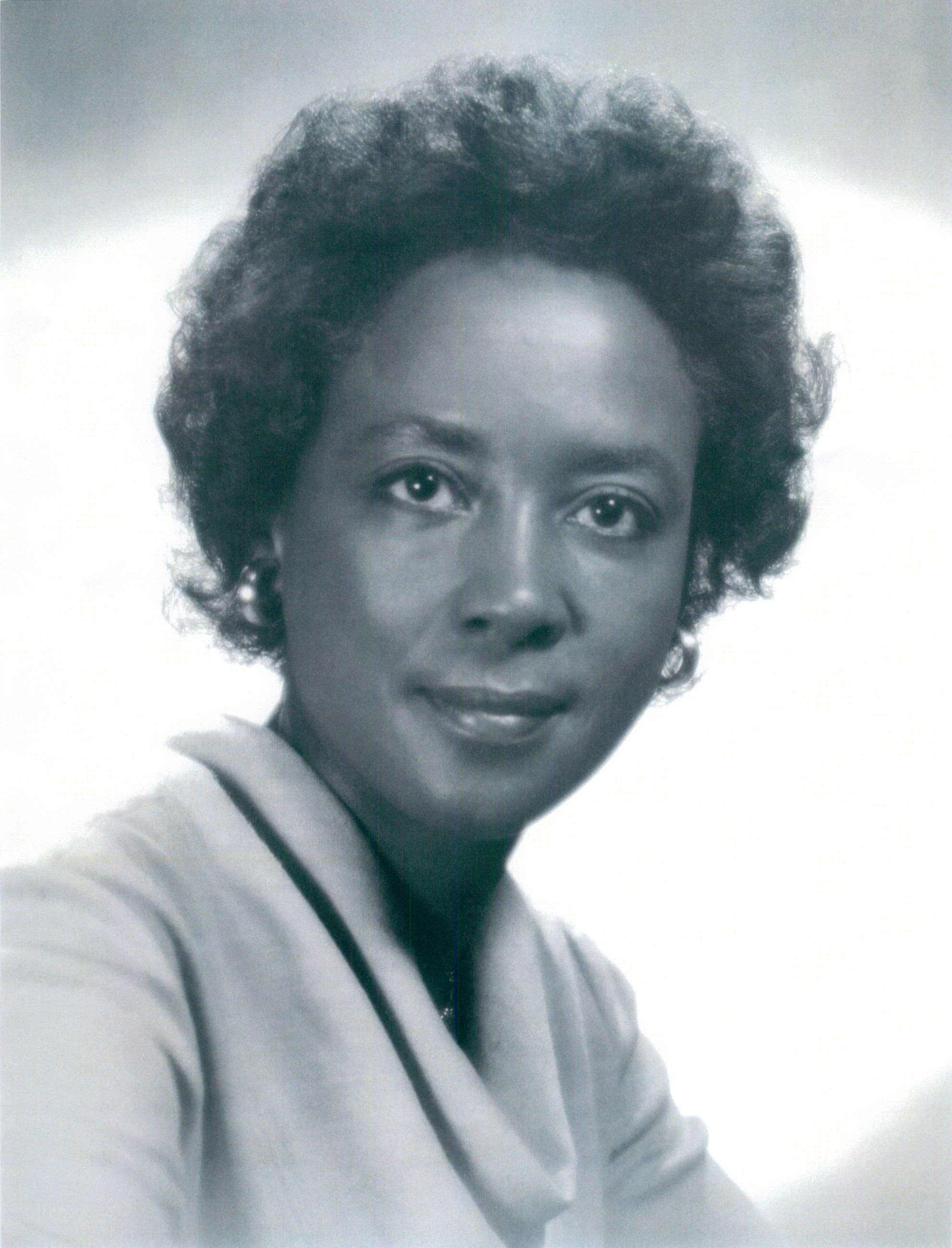
- Born: Annie Jean Easley; April 23, 1933; Birmingham, Alabama
- Died: June 25, 2011 (aged 78); Cleveland, Ohio
- Education: Cleveland State University (BS)
- Occupation: Computer engineer
- Employer(s): Lewis Research Center at National Aeronautics and Space Administration (NASA); National Advisory Committee for Aeronautics

Annie Jean Easley (April 23, 1933 – June 25, 2011) was an American computer scientist who contributed significantly to the beginning iterations of NASA's rocket technologies.

Easley was born in 1933 in Birmingham, Alabama, and was raised by a single mother. Segregation disallowed Annie from many normal job opportunities that others of different color and gender might get, but her mother strived for her to have a good education nonetheless. She attended Holy Family High School for most of her schooling life, culminating in her graduating as valedictorian.

From there, Easley enrolled at Xavier University in New Orleans to study pharmacy. Her interest in the subject waned from her initial excitement, and she returned to Birmingham briefly in 1945 to vote but was subjected to the poll tax. Her college experiences helped her to encourage other women to overcome some of the voting restrictions.

Eventually, Easley would get married and move to Cleveland, Ohio with the intention of attending the School of Pharmacy. However, she could not as the local university had shut down their School of Pharmacy. She read an article in the paper about a mathematician opportunity in NASA. Following that reading, her career started as a NASA engineer and spanned decades, inspiring many women of color and outreach programs to support women in STEM fields.

Her innovation in programming technologies, energy-conversion, and shuttle launches made her a significant part of NASA’s history and addressed a major pain point they had at the time: lack of interdisciplinary mathematicians and programmers. The work she did spanned all aspects of her life, from her previous degrees to her newly learned languages and work of battery cells all contributed greatly to NASA’s project Centaur launches and paved the way forward for future iterations of space shuttles. Additionally, her work in outreach programs for young innovators and mathematicians was instrumental in breaking down gender barriers for STEM.

== Early life and education ==
Annie Easley was born to Bud and Willie (née Sims) McCrory in Birmingham, Alabama. She had a brother six years her senior. Her mother raised them as a single mother.

Before the Civil Rights Movement, educational and career opportunities for African-American children were very limited. Segregation was prevalent, African-American children were educated separately from white children, and their schools were often inferior to white schools. Annie's mother told her that she could be anything, but she would have to work at it. She encouraged Annie to get a good education. From the fifth grade through high school, Annie attended Holy Family High School, and was valedictorian of her graduating class. At a young age Annie had interest in becoming a nurse, but around the age of 16 she decided to study pharmacy.

In 1950, Easley enrolled in classes at Xavier University of Louisiana in New Orleans, an African-American Catholic university, and majored in pharmacy for about two years. She left Xavier to get married and moved to Cleveland, Ohio.

In 1977, she obtained a Bachelor of Science in Mathematics from Cleveland State University.

== Career ==
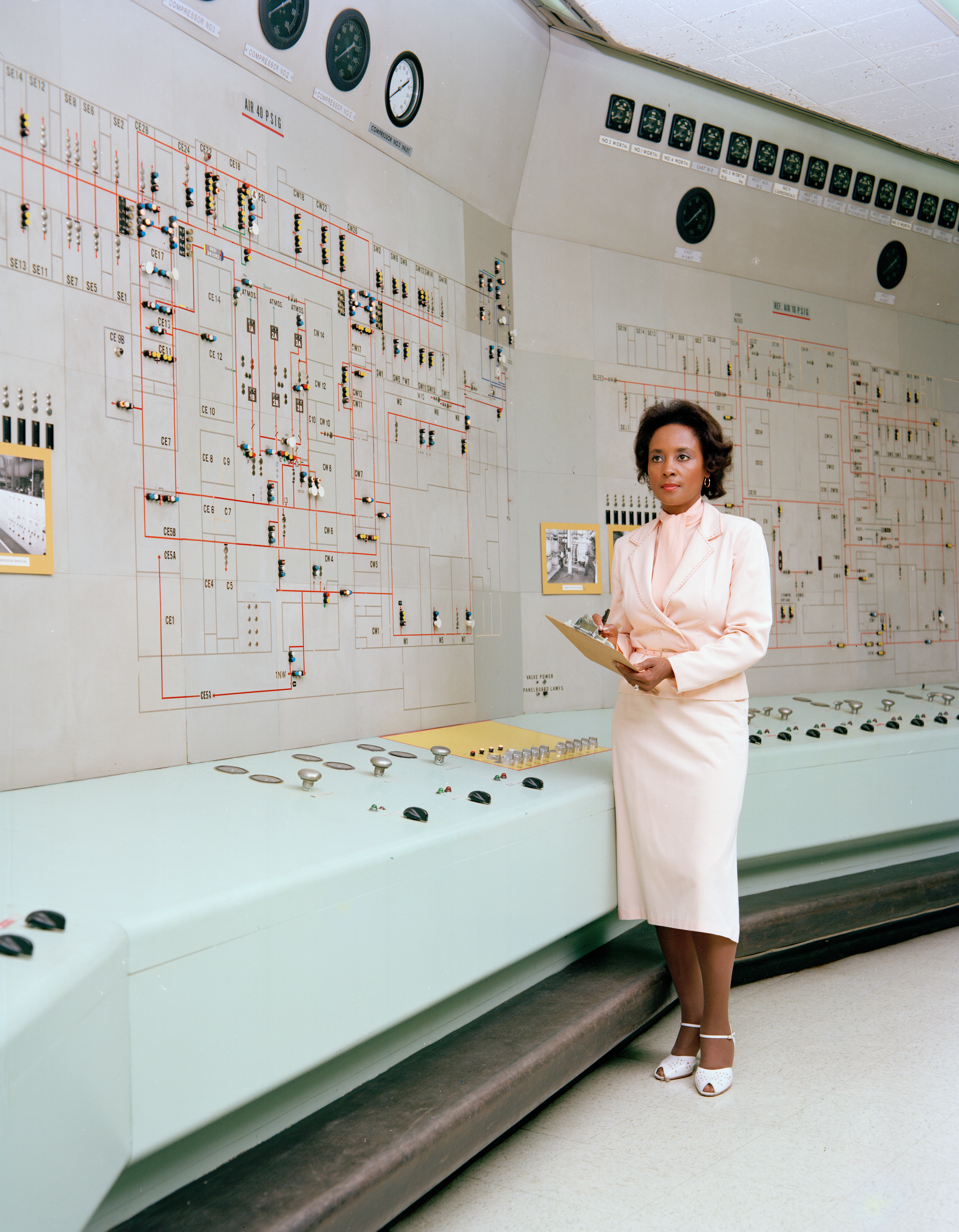
Easley in 1981 at Glenn Research Center

Her career began as a human computer in 1955, doing computations for researchers by hand. Her first work was on running simulations for the newly instated Plum Brook Reactor facility. At the time of hiring, she was only one of four African American employees in the lab. Despite these troubles, she always maintained a positive attitude and tried to go out and do her best work as she famously said in a 2001 interview.

Easley began as a human computer, performing manual calculations for researchers before transitioning to computer programming as digital systems were introduced at NASA. As computers evolved and programming languages were developed, Easley mastered them quickly. Her skill in Formula Translating System (Fortran) and the Simple Object Access Protocol (SOAP) made her critical in supporting a lot of NASA’s early programs. Her code was integrated into analyzing energy-conversion and power-technology systems for early-model hybrid vehicles and rockets.

One of her notable technical contributions was her work on energy conversion systems, including simulations that supported the development of battery technology for early hybrid vehicles. She was also involved in programs related to alternative energy sources, including solar and wind technologies. These skills would serve her well in the development of Centaur, a high-energy booster rocket which was dedicated to being one of the most powerful rockets in the U.S. space program. The unique fuel mix of liquid hydrogen and oxygen were in part inspired by Easley. Easley played a significant role in the Centaur rocket program, which was critical to the success of multiple satellite launches and planetary missions. Her programming work supported analyses and mission planning for the Centaur upper-stage rocket, known for being the first to use liquid hydrogen and liquid oxygen as propellants. This technology was integral to launching spacecraft for missions such as Cassini and Voyager, and remains a foundational component of modern rocket design.

In the 1970s, Easley pivoted slightly to finish a degree in Mathematics at Cleveland State while working full-time. She encouraged many other women of color at the university to be passionate and follow their dreams despite how hard they may be.

Throughout her 34-year career at NASA, Easley faced systemic obstacles that were common for women and minorities in STEM fields. Despite holding a mathematics degree and taking internal specialization courses, she was not always afforded the same professional development opportunities as her peers. For instance, she was denied educational financial aid without explanation and was hired at a lower pay grade than promised. In her interview, she was told she would start as a GS-3, but her first paycheck listed her as a GS-2. When she questioned it, she was told no GS-3 positions were available.

In addition to her technical work, Easley served as an Equal Employment Opportunity (EEO) counselor at NASA, helping to mediate and resolve workplace discrimination cases. She advocated for inclusive hiring practices and was involved in recruitment outreach to colleges, encouraging more women and minorities to enter engineering and science careers. Easley retired from NASA in 1989, leaving behind a legacy of resilience, innovation, and quiet leadership that helped expand the boundaries of who could contribute to scientific advancement at the nation’s space agency.

Her 34-year career included developing and implementing computer code that analyzed alternative power technologies, supported the Centaur high-energy upper rocket stage, determined solar, wind and energy projects, and identified energy conversion systems and alternative systems to solve energy problems. During the 1970s Easley worked on a project examining damage to the ozone layer. With massive cuts in the NASA space program, Easley began working on energy problems; her energy assignments included studies to determine the life use of storage batteries, such as those used in electric utility vehicles. Her computer applications have been used to identify energy conversion systems that offer the improvement over commercially available technologies. Following the energy crisis of the late 1970s, Easley studied the economic advantages of co-generating power plants that obtained byproducts from coal and steam. After retiring in 1989, she remained an active participant in the Speaker's Bureau and the Business & Professional Women's Foundation. Despite her long career and numerous contributions to research, she was cut out of NASA's promotional photos. In response to one such event, Easley responded by saying "I'm out here to do a job and I knew I had the ability to do it, and that's where my focus was, on getting the job done. I was not intentionally trying to be a pioneer."

Easley's work with the Centaur project helped lay the technological foundations for future space shuttle launches and launches of communication, military and weather satellites. Her work contributed to the 1997 flight to Saturn of the Cassini probe, the launcher of which had the Centaur as its upper stage.

Annie Easley was interviewed in Cleveland on August 21, 2001, by Sandra Johnson. The interview is stored in the National Aeronautics and Space Administration Johnson Space Center Oral History Program. The 55 page interview transcript includes material on the history of the Civil Rights Movement, Glenn Research Center, Johnson Space Center, space flight, and the contribution of women to space flight. In that same Interview, Easley was asked whether she still played with gadgets and stated "I don't have the time or the desire. I will get the email and I'll send it, but I don't play with it. It's not like this fascinating thing I play with. I'd much rather be out doing something actively, like on the golf course or doing other things."

Easley lived in a time when women and African-Americans faced discrimination within society. She experienced discrimination related to being an African-American during her career. In one incident, her face was cut out from a picture to put it on display. In her 34-year career she worked in four different departments: the Computer Services Division, the Energy Directorate, the Launch Vehicles Group and the Engineering Directorate, although none of her moves were due to promotions, which she recognized may have been due to her race or sex.

Throughout the 1970s, Easley advocated for and encouraged female and minority students at college career days to work in STEM careers. She tutored elementary and high school children as well as young adults who had dropped out of school in a work-study program.

Easley was also a budding athlete who founded and subsequently became the first President of the NASA Lewis Ski Club and participated in other local ski clubs in the Cleveland area. Easley began skiing at age of 46.

A crater spanning five-and-a-half miles on the moon was named Easley in memory of her by the International Astronomical Union on February 1, 2021.

Easley was entered into both the Ohio Women's Hall of Fame and the Glenn Research Center Hall of Fame.

== Personal life ==
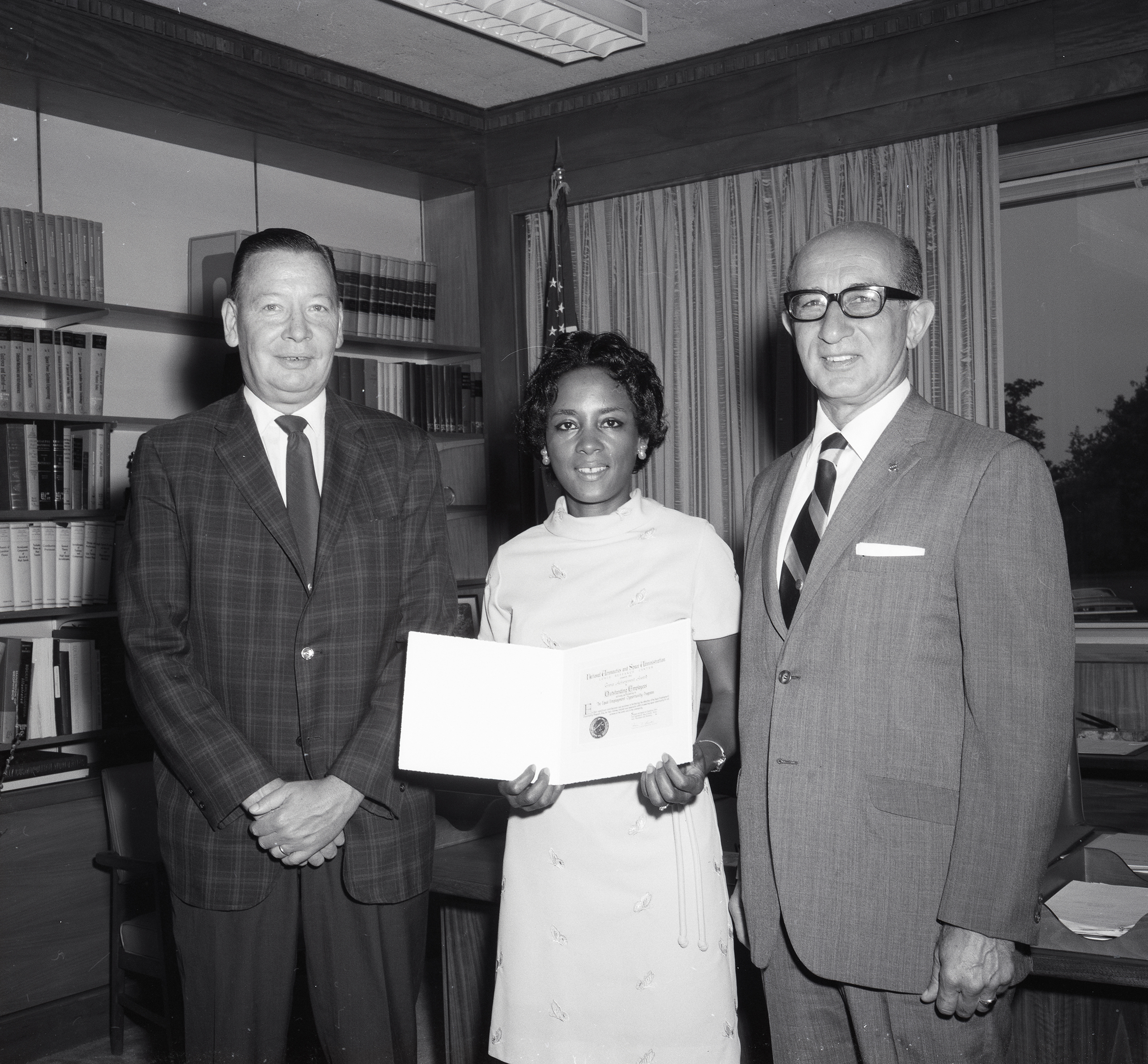
Annie Easley receives a Special Achievement Award from Director of Administration Henry Barnett (left) and Deputy Director Gene Manganiello (June 30, 1970).

In 1954, Annie Easley married a man who was in the military. After her husband was discharged from the military, the two of them moved to Cleveland, Ohio to be near his family.

After divorcing her husband, Easley returned to Birmingham. As part of the Jim Crow laws that maintained racial inequality, African Americans were required to pass a literacy test and pay a poll tax in order to vote, which was outlawed in 1964 in the Twenty-fourth Amendment. She remembered the test giver looking at her application and saying only, "You went to Xavier University. Two dollars." Subsequently, she helped other African Americans prepare for the test.

Easley had always loved dressing up. She wore stockings and heels almost every day in college. Although there was no dress code in her work department, wearing pants as a woman during that time was still not normalized. However, she was one of the first to wear pants to work in the 1970s after talking to her supervisor about it.

In her first three years after retiring from NASA, Easley focused on volunteer work, often telling people she put more miles on her car as a retiree than as a worker. She traveled the world, mostly to ski, and become an independent contractor in real estate. Although she no longer tutored, she expressed that she was always willing to talk to students at career days and similar events if asked.

== Selected works ==
- Performance and Operational Economics Estimates for a Coal Gasification Combined-Cycle Cogeneration Powerplant. Nainiger, Joseph J.; Burns, Raymond K.; Easley, Annie J. NASA, Lewis Research Center, Cleveland, Ohio. NASA Tech Memo 82729 Mar 1982 31p.
- Bleed Cycle Propellant Pumping in a Gas-Core Nuclear Rocket Engine System. Kascak, A. F.; Easley, A. J. National Aeronautics and Space Administration. Lewis Research Center, Cleveland, Ohio. Report No.: NASA-TM-X-2517; E-6639 March 1972.
- Effect of Turbulent Mixing on Average Fuel Temperatures in a Gas-Core Nuclear Rocket Engine. Easley, A. J.; Kascak, A. F.; National Aeronautics and Space Administration. Lewis Research Center, Cleveland, Ohio. Report No.: NASA-TN-D-4882 Nov 1968.

== See also ==
- Katherine Johnson
- List of African-American women in STEM fields
