= Naval Reserve =

A naval reserve is a military body which forms part of a nation's navy and is called upon in times of conflict.

Naval Reserve may refer to:

== Europe ==
- La réserve Marine, France
- Royal Naval Reserve, United Kingdom
- Naval Service Reserve, Ireland
- Royal Netherlands Navy Reserve, Netherlands

== North America ==
- Canadian Forces Naval Reserve
- United States Navy Reserve

== Asia ==
- Naval Reserve Command (Philippine Navy)

== Oceania ==
- Royal Australian Naval Reserve
- Royal New Zealand Naval Volunteer Reserve
