= Tsinger (crater) =

Crater on the Moon

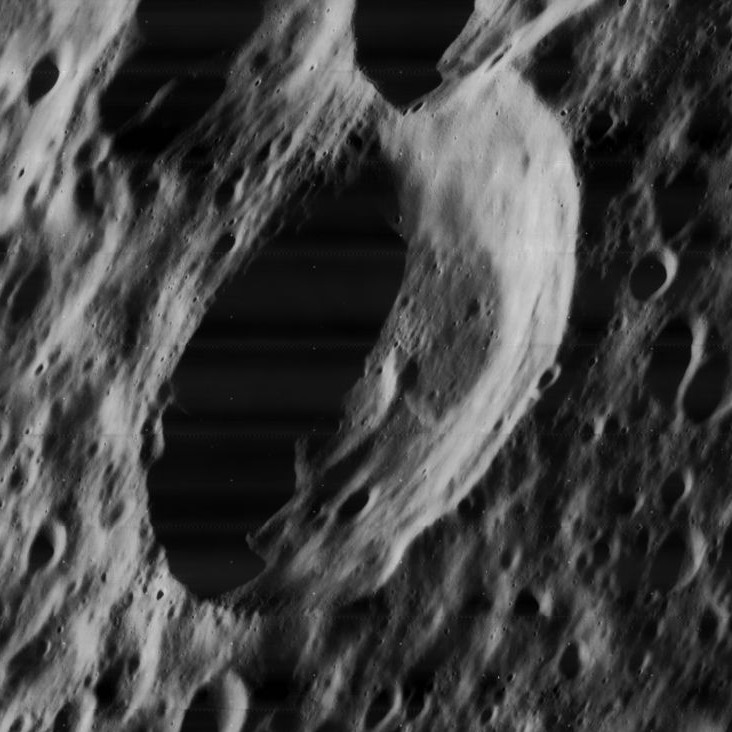
- Oblique Lunar Orbiter 5 image
- Coordinates: 56.7°N 175.6°E
- Diameter: 44 km
- Depth: Unknown
- Colongitude: 185° at sunrise
- Eponym: Nikolaj Y. Tsinger

Tsinger is a lunar impact crater that is located in the northern latitudes of the Moon's far side. This crater has a perimeter that is nearly circular, except for an outward bulge to the southwest. Attached to the northern outer rim is the relatively fresh satellite crater Tsinger Y, which, together with Tsinger, partly overlaps the much older crater Tsinger W.

The features of Tsinger have escaped significant erosion from subsequent impacts, and the rim edge remains sharply defined. The interior floor is about half the diameter of the crater, and there is a small central peak at the midpoint. The inner walls have some ledge formation along the south, but are otherwise relatively featureless.

== Satellite craters ==
By convention these features are identified on lunar maps by placing the letter on the side of the crater midpoint that is closest to Tsinger.

Tsinger	Latitude	Longitude	Diameter
W	58.1° N	173.8° E	53 km
Y	58.1° N	175.1° E	31 km
