= Damoiseau (crater) =

Lunar impact crater

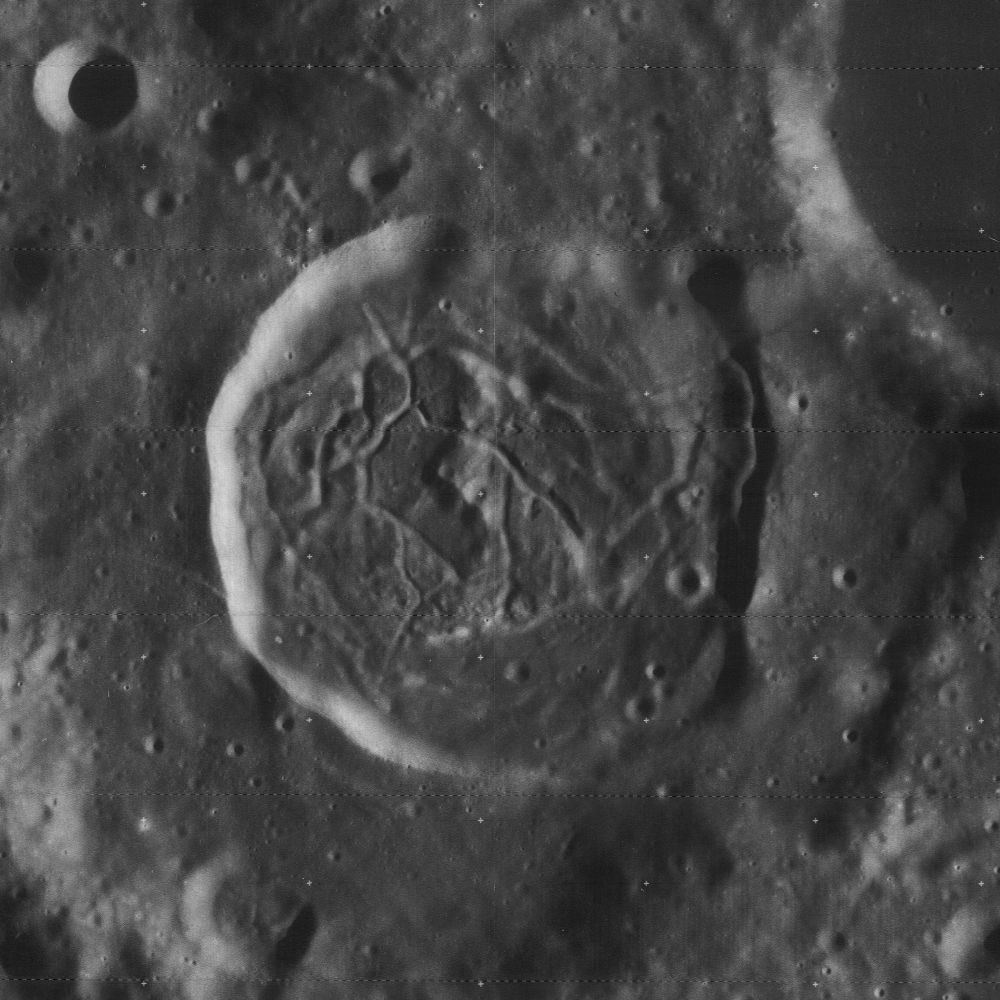
- Lunar Orbiter 4 image
- Coordinates: 4.85°S 61.25°W
- Diameter: 36.66 km (22.78 mi)
- Depth: 1.25 km (0.78 mi)
- Colongitude: 61° at sunrise
- Eponym: Marie-C.-T. de Damoiseau

Damoiseau is a lunar impact crater that is located just to the west of the Oceanus Procellarum, in the western part of the Moon's near side. It is described as a complex multiple crater, and lies due east of the prominent basin Grimaldi, a walled plain with a distinctive dark floor. Due south of Damoiseau is the crater Sirsalis.

The low outer rim of Damoiseau is not quite circular, having an outward protrusion to the northeast and smaller bulges to the north and southeast. The interior floor is irregular and complex, with a series of fractures (similar to Vitello). There is a low ridge near the midpoint. The crater is concentric with a larger, older crater designated Damoiseau M that is approximately twice the diameter. This outer feature is missing a rim to the northeast where it intersects the lunar mare.

To the southwest is a rille system named Rimae Grimaldi, named after the crater. This continues to the west and south, for a maximum diameter of 162 kilometers.

The Damoiseau formation is named after French astronomer Baron Marie-Charles-Theodor de Damoiseau (1768-1846). His name was introduced with the lunar nomenclature of German astronomer Johann Heinrich von Mädler by 1837. Its designation was formally adopted by the International Astronomical Union in 1935. Its satellite craters were named in 2006.

== Bright satellite crater Damoiseau E ==
Bright satellite crater Damoiseau E, east of Damoiseau itself, is an eye-catcher during and after full moon. Damoiseau E forms with the bright satellite craters Lohrmann A and Grimaldi C a distinctive trio at the western shore of Oceanus Procellarum, east-northeast of the dark Grimaldi. The brightness of Damoiseau E and of its neighbours Lohrmann A and Grimaldi C is also noticeable on the photographic version of chart LAC 74 (page 148) in The Clementine Atlas of the Moon (Ben Bussey / Paul D. Spudis).

== Nameless hillock ==
A bright nameless hillock east of Damoiseau, at Latitude -4.01 / Longitude 303.46 in Oceanus Procellarum, diameter 2 kilometres, is detectable during local sunrise (morning terminator).

== Satellite craters ==
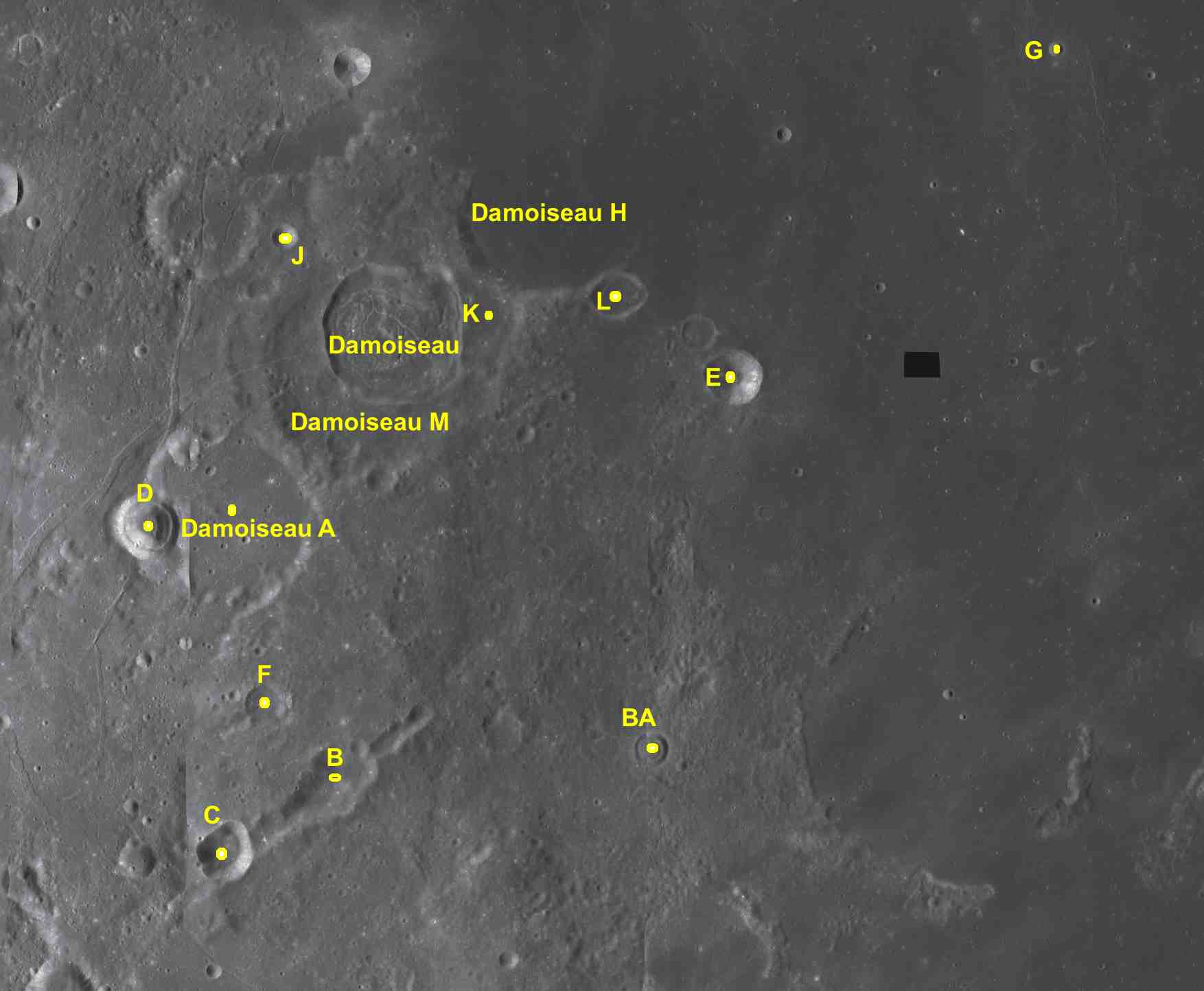
Neighborhood of Damoiseau, including satellite features

By convention these features are identified on lunar maps by placing the letter on the side of the crater midpoint that is closest to Damoiseau.

Damoiseau	Latitude	Longitude	Diameter
A	6.3° S	62.4° W	47 km
B	8.6° S	61.6° W	23 km
BA	8.3° S	59.0° W	9 km
C	9.1° S	62.5° W	15 km
D	6.4° S	63.3° W	17 km
E	5.2° S	58.3° W	14 km
F	7.9° S	62.1° W	11 km
G	2.5° S	55.6° W	4 km
H	3.8° S	59.8° W	45 km
J	4.1° S	62.0° W	7 km
K	4.6° S	60.4° W	23 km
L	4.5° S	59.3° W	14 km
M	5.1° S	61.3° W	54 km

Damoiseau BA is a concentric (double-walled) crater. Anorthosite has been identified in Damoiseau C and D, most likely coming from the Grimaldi ejecta.

== Gallery ==
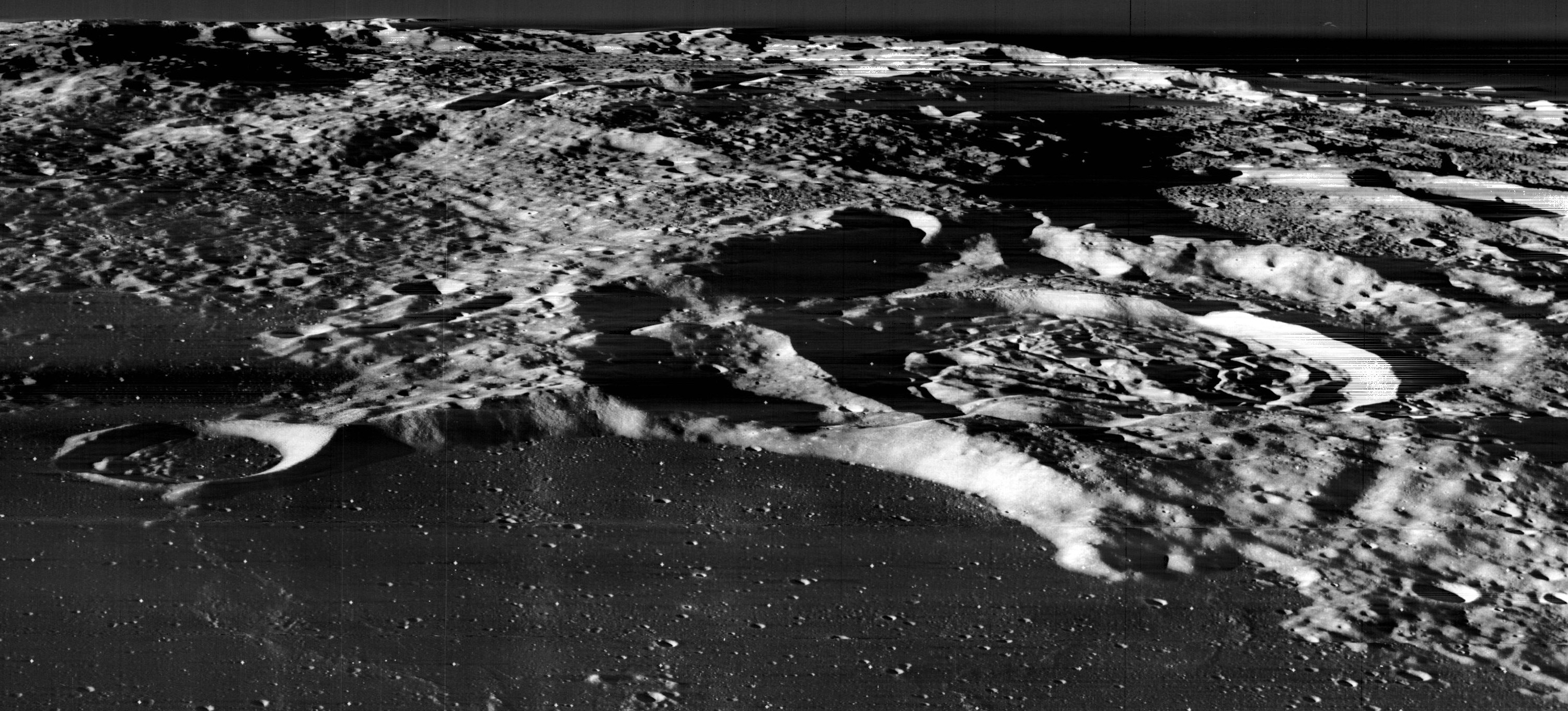
Oblique view of Damoiseau (right of center) from Lunar Orbiter 3, facing southwest.

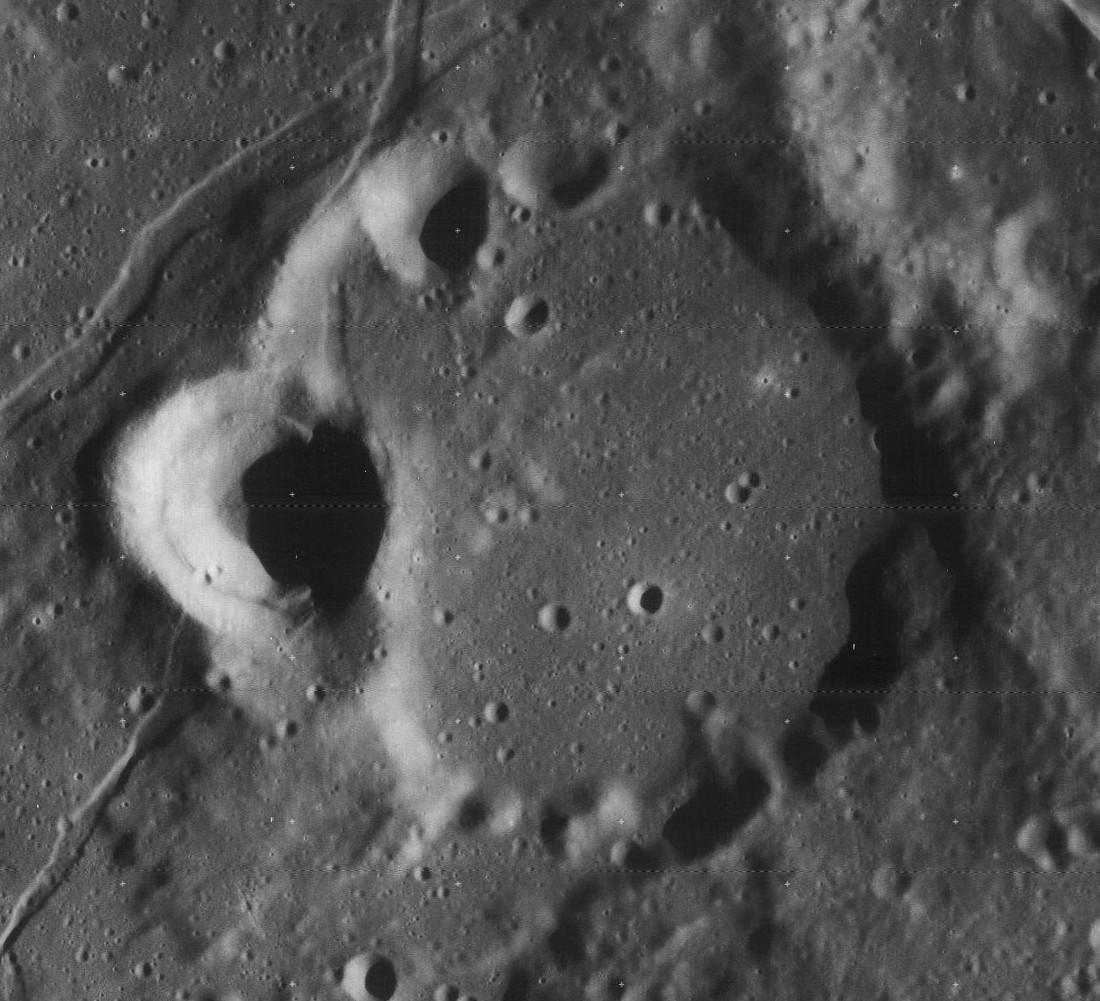
Damoiseau A (larger) and D (smaller, at left) craters
