= Marie-Charles Damoiseau =

French astronomer (1768–1846)

Baron Marie-Charles-Théodore de Damoiseau de Montfort (6 April 1768 in Besançon – 6 August 1846) was a French astronomer.

Damoiseau was originally an artillery officer but he left France in 1792 during the French Revolution. He worked as assistant director at the Lisbon Observatory before he returned to France in 1807.

In 1825, he was elected a member of the French Academy of Sciences. He was a member of the Bureau des Longitudes.

He is best known for publishing lunar tables (positions of the Moon) between 1824 and 1828.

== Scientific work ==
=== Theory of the Moon ===
In 1818, Laplace proposed that the Académie des Sciences in Paris set up a prize to be awarded to whoever succeeded in constructing lunar tables based solely on the law of universal gravity. In 1820, the prize was awarded to Carlini and Plana and to Damoiseau by a committee that included Laplace.

=== Satellites of Jupiter ===
See also

- David P. Todd, A continuation of de Damoiseau's tables of the satellites of Jupiter, to the year 1900, 1876
- John Couch Adams, Continuation of Tables I. and III. of Damoiseau's Tables of Jupiter's satellites, 1877

== Honors ==
- He won the Gold Medal of the Royal Astronomical Society in 1831.
- Elected a Foreign Honorary Member of the American Academy of Arts and Sciences in 1832.*
- The crater Damoiseau on the Moon is named after him.

== Manuscripts ==
The Paris observatory holds a large set of manuscripts from Damoiseau. See Manuscrits Damoiseau on http://alidade.obspm.fr

== Publications ==
- Éphémérides nauticas, ou Diario astronomico para 1799 [-1805] calculado no Observatorio real da marinha (8 volumes, 1798–1802)
- Memoria relativa aos eclipses do sol visiveis em Lisboa, desde 1800 até 1900 inclusivamente (1801)
- Tables de la lune, formées par la seule théorie de l'attraction et suivant la division de la circonférence en 400 degrés (1824)
- Tables de la lune, formées par la seule théorie de l'attraction et suivant la division de la circonférence en 360 degrés (1828)
- Tables écliptiques des satellites de Jupiter, d'après la théorie de leurs attractions mutuelles et les constantes déduites des observations (1836)
