= Daniel Chalonge =

French astronomer and astrophysicist (1895–1977)

Daniel Chalonge (January 21, 1895 – November 28, 1977) was a French astronomer and astrophysicist. He was born in Grenoble and studied in Paris under Charles Fabry. Chalonge worked as an astronomer at the Observatoire de Paris, the Observatoire d'Haute Provence and the Swiss Jungfraujoch Scientific Station. One of the founders of the Institut d'astrophysique de Paris, his studies included the stellar spectrum of hydrogen, stellar photometry and classification, and measurement of the ozone layer. During the Nazi occupation of France, Chalogne assumed the position of director of the Institut d'astrophysique de Paris after the previous director, Henri Mineur, was arrested by the Gestapo. Chalonge developed a microphotometer, which was subsequently named after him. Between 1936 and 1982 he authored (or co-authored) over 90 scientific papers.

Chalonge died in Paris, survived by his wife and two daughters, Karen and Sonia.

== Biography ==
A former student of the École normale supérieure (Paris) (class of 1916), Daniel Chalonge obtained his agrégation in physics in 1921 and studied under professor and astronomer Charles Fabry. He was one of the founders of the Paris Astrophysics Institute. He studied and analyzed the stellar spectrum of hydrogen, stellar photometry, and the measurement and classification of the ozone layer. He worked on this research with astrophysicists Daniel Barbier and Renée Canavaggia.

Daniel Chalonge worked as an astronomer at the Paris Observatory, the Haute-Provence Observatory, and the Swiss scientific station at Jungfraujoch.

Daniel Chalonge developed a microphotometer, which was later named after him.

Between 1936 and 1982, he authored (or co-authored) nearly a hundred scientific articles.

== Awards and honors ==
- Janssen Medal from the French Academy of Sciences (1949)
- Prix Jules Janssen awarded by the Société astronomique de France (1958)
- The crater Chalonge on the Moon is named after him.
- Chalonge mountain in the Alps is named after him.
- The International School of Astrophysics Daniel Chalonge is named after him.
- The Daniel Chalonge Museum in Erice, Italy is named after him.
