= Georg Samuel Dörffel =

German astronomer and theologian

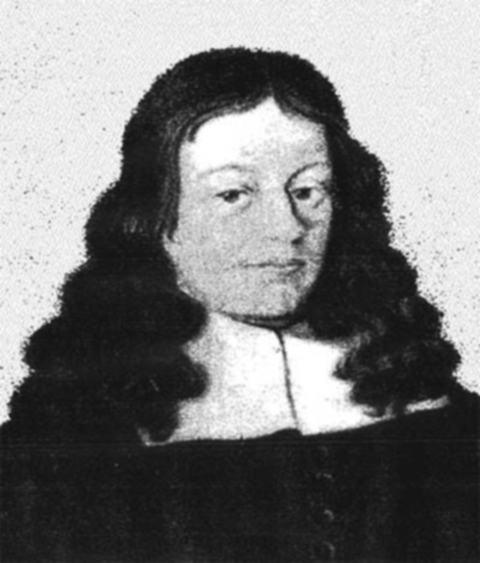
Georg Samuel Dörffel

Georg Samuel Dörffel (11 October or 21 November 1643 – 6 or 16 August 1688) was a German theologian and amateur astronomer. Both the lunar crater Doerfel and the minor planet 4076 Dörffel are named in his honour.

== Biography ==
Georg Samuel Dörffel was born in Plauen (Saxony, Germany) in 1643. His father Friedrich Dörffel was a clergyman who worked as the private tutor of the prince-elector of Brandenburg. Georg studied in Plauen, Leipzig and Jena. He obtained a master's degree in philosophy in 1663, and a bachelor in theology in 1667.

Dörffel worked as a clergyman from 1672 onwards, and became superintendent of Thuringia in 1684. He showed considerable interest in astronomy from his youth, and published more than 10 astronomical studies from 1672 on. His main contribution was his observation that the two comets observed in 1680/81 were in fact one and the same, describing a parabolic path around the Sun. This was the Great Comet of 1680. While others like John Flamsteed also drew the conclusion that there was only one comet involved here, Dörffel was the first to correctly calculate its trajectory. The importance of Dörffel's study was largely ignored until the late 18th century.

He married three times, and had 10 children with his third wife. He died in 1688 in Weida, Thuringia, Germany.

== Publications ==
- 1670: Tirocinium accentuationis, ad lectionem Blblicam practice accomodatum
- 1681: Astronomische Beobachtung des Grossen Cometen
- 1683: Der ärgste Seelengifft des trostlosen Pabstthums entdeckt
