= Chalonge (crater) =

Crater on the Moon

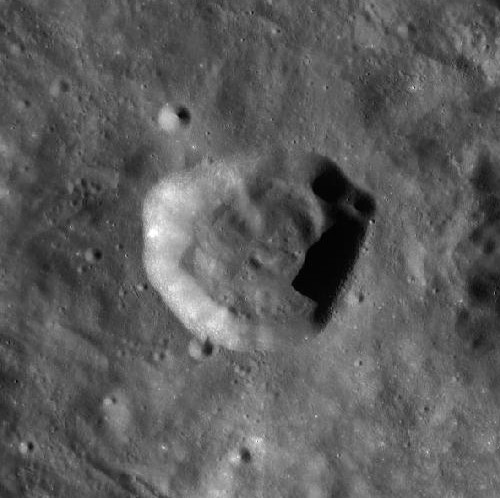
- LRO WAC image
- Coordinates: 20.44°S 116.35°W
- Diameter: 25.08 km (15.58 mi)
- Depth: Unknown
- Colongitude: 339° at sunrise
- Eponym: Daniel Chalonge

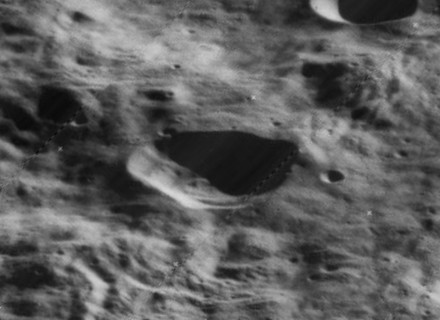
Oblique Lunar Orbiter 5 image, facing west

Chalonge is a lunar impact crater that is located on the far side of the Moon. It lies to the southwest of the larger crater Lewis, in the outer skirt of ejecta that surrounds the Mare Orientale impact basin. To the southeast are the Montes Cordillera, a ring of mountains that encircle the Mare Orientale formation.

This is a roughly circular crater with a sharp-edged, outer rim that is not appreciably eroded. There is an outward protrusion of the crater wall to the northeast. The inner walls slope directly down to an irregular ring of slumped material that encircles the interior floor. Previously identified as Lewis R, this formation is named after French astronomer Daniel Chalonge (1895-1977). Its designation was formally adopted by the International Astronomical Union in 1985.
