= Debye (crater) =

Lunar impact crater

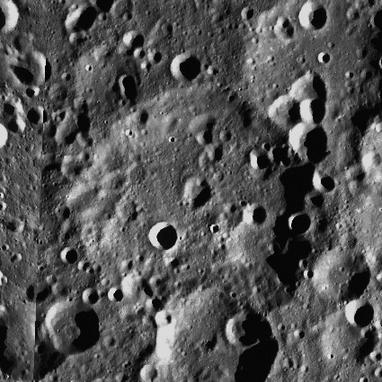
- LRO image
- Coordinates: 49.43°N 176.03°E
- Diameter: 127.03 km (78.93 mi)
- Depth: Unknown
- Colongitude: 179° at sunrise
- Formation: Pre-Nectarian
- Eponym: Peter Debye

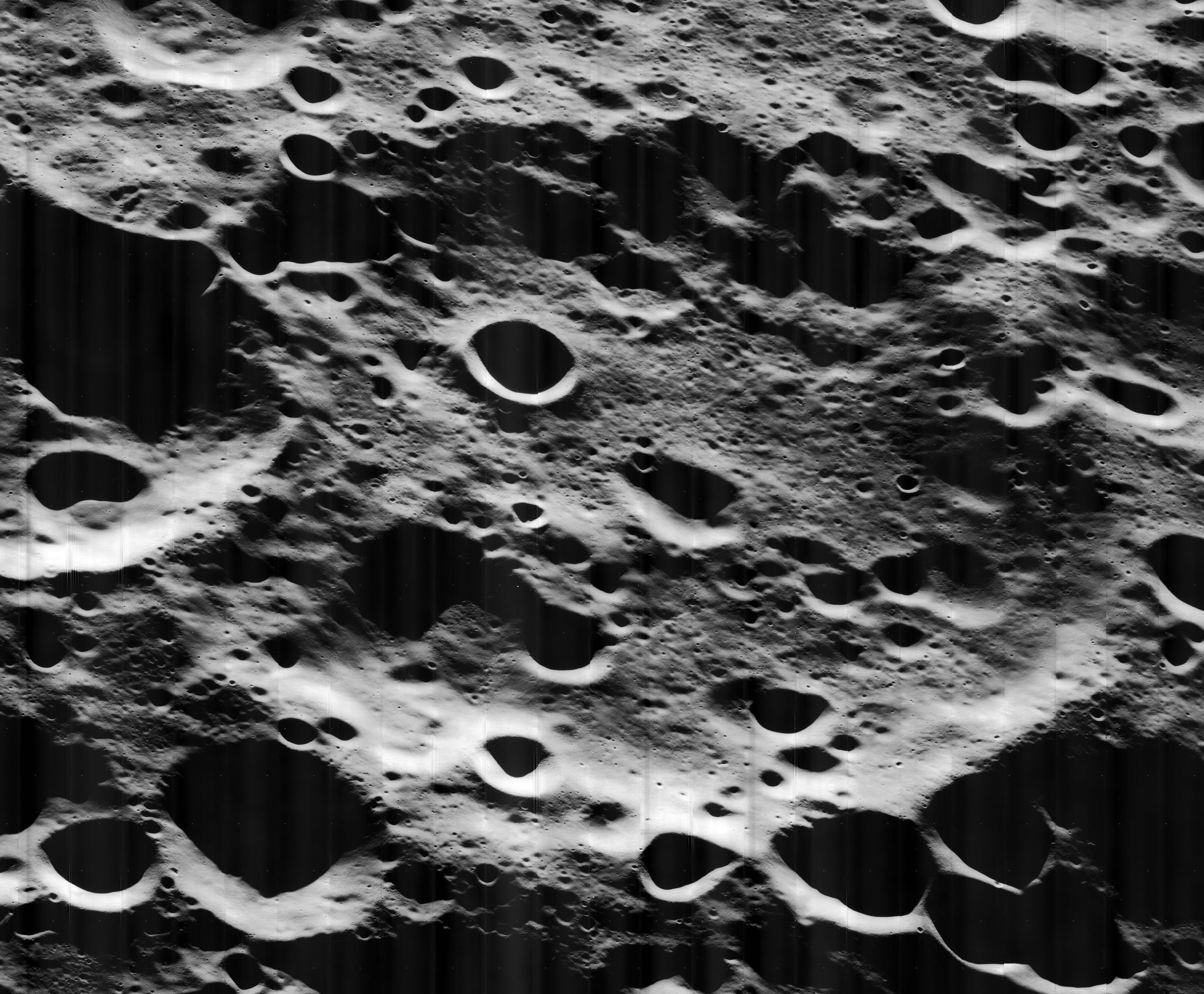
Oblique Lunar Orbiter 5 image, facing west

Debye is a degraded lunar impact crater that is located in the northern hemisphere on the Moon's far side, as seen from the Earth. It lies to the south of the crater Chappell, to the southwest of the walled plain named Rowland, and to the east of the crater D'Alembert.

On the lunar geologic timescale, this formation dates to the Pre-Nectarian period. The outer rim of this crater has been heavily battered by impacts, and is somewhat distorted from the form of a circle. The northeast rim in particular has become straightened by impact modification, and the crater rim as a whole has a roughly polygonal shape. The southern rim is overlaid by the smaller crater Perkin. The most heavily eroded section of the rim is along the northeast, where a cluster of overlapping craters intrudes into the side. The western rim is notched and indented by several small impacts.

The crater interior is nearly as battered as the outer rim. The outer rampart of Perkin intrudes part way across the southern floor, with ejecta from that impact covering an area 20 km × 30 km to a depth of 1.5 km. Parts of remaining interior have been bombarded and churned by impacts, leaving an irregular surface that is nearly as rough as the terrain that surrounds the crater. The freshest of these impacts is a small, cup-shaped crater just to the southwest of the midpoint. The infrared spectrum of pure crystalline plagioclase has been identified on the southwest floor.

The crater was named after Dutch physicist Peter Debye (1884–1966), who in 1936 became a Nobel laureate in chemistry. This designation was formally adopted by the IAU in 1970.

== Satellite craters ==
By convention these features are identified on lunar maps by placing the letter on the side of the crater midpoint that is closest to Debye.

Debye	Latitude	Longitude	Diameter
E	50.4° N	171.0° W	41 km
J	48.4° N	172.6° W	30 km
Q	47.5° N	178.4° W	26 km
