= Anaxagoras (disambiguation) =

Anaxagoras may refer to:

- Anaxagoras, a pre-Socratic Greek philosopher
- Anaxagoras of Aegina, a sculptor
- 4180 Anaxagoras, a main-belt asteroid
- Anaxagoras (crater), a young lunar impact crater
- Anaxagoras (mythology), a king of Argos in Greek mythology
