= De Sitter (crater) =

Lunar impact crater

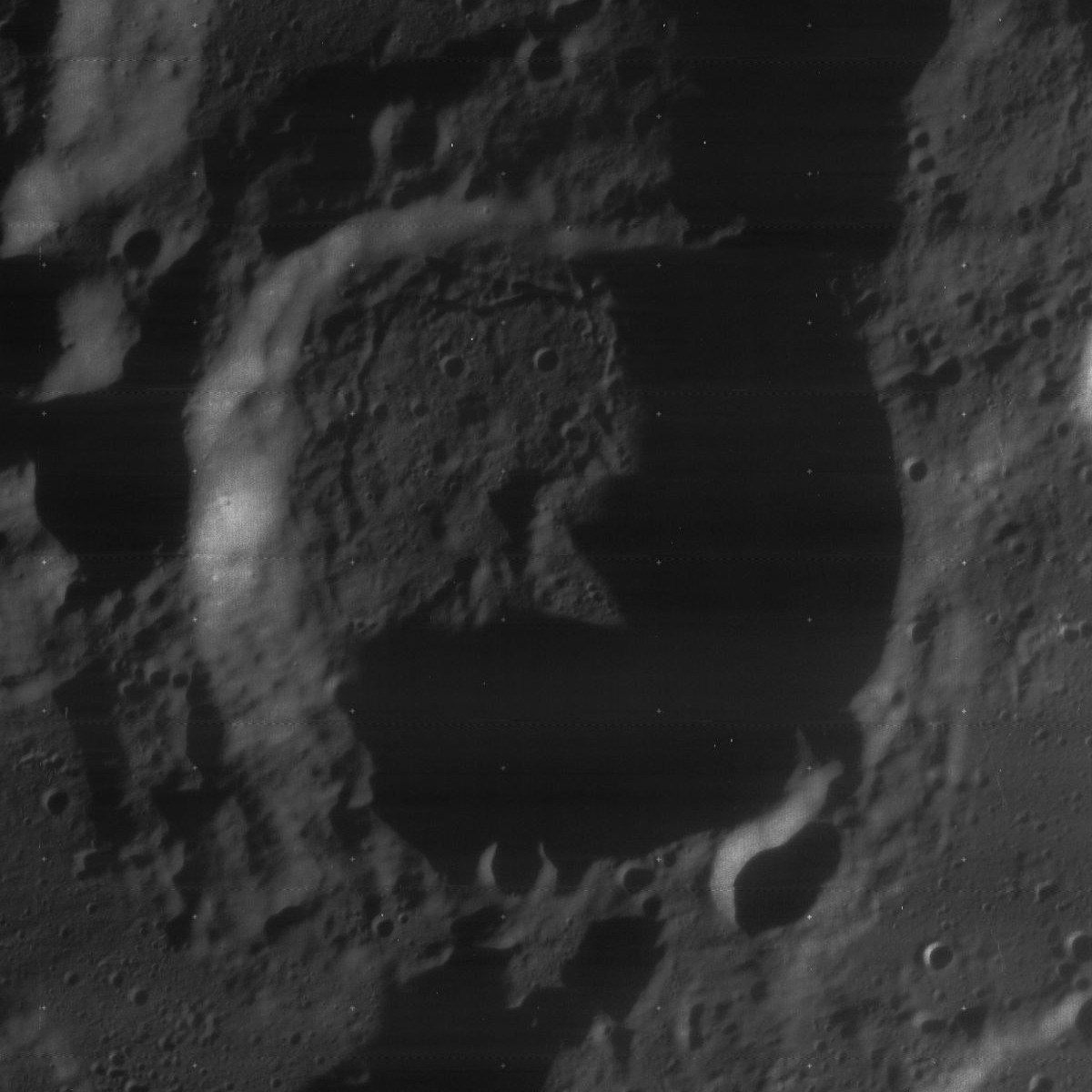
- Lunar Orbiter 4 image
- Coordinates: 80.1°N 39.6°E
- Diameter: 63.79 km (39.64 mi)
- Depth: Unknown
- Colongitude: 328° at sunrise
- Eponym: Willem de Sitter

De Sitter is a lunar impact crater that is located near the northern limb of the Moon, to the north of the Baillaud–Euctemon crater pair. Due to its location, this crater appears very foreshortened when viewed from the Earth, limiting the detail that can be viewed. The crater also receives sunlight at a low angle, when it is on the sunlit side.

This crater forms part of an unusual three-crater cluster, with De Sitter overlying the northeast rim of De Sitter L and the southern rim of De Sitter M. All three craters are of comparable dimension, with the largest being De Sitter M. Where De Sitter overlies the other two craters, its outer rim appears slumped. The rim is more sharply formed along the east-southeast side. Lying next to this part of the rim is De Sitter G, a small formation of two merged craters.

The interior floor of De Sitter is somewhat irregular and hummocky, with a slender central ridge near the midpoint. There are several small and tiny craterlets across the interior floor. There are some rilles near the inner wall, possibly volcanic in origin.

This crater is named after Dutch astronomer and cosmologist Willem de Sitter (1872–1934). Its designation was formally adopted by the International Astronomical Union in 1964.

== Satellite craters ==
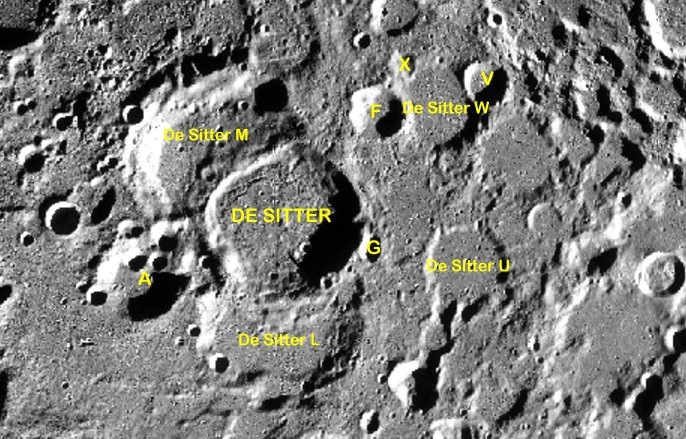
Satellite features of De Sitter

By convention these features are identified on lunar maps by placing the letter on the side of the crater midpoint that is closest to De Sitter.

De Sitter	Latitude	Longitude	Diameter
A	80.2° N	26.6° E	36 km
F	80.2° N	51.0° E	22 km
G	78.9° N	42.7° E	9 km
L	78.8° N	34.5° E	69 km
M	81.3° N	38.5° E	81 km
U	77.8° N	46.5° E	37 km
V	79.1° N	56.9° E	17 km
W	79.4° N	54.1° E	40 km
X	80.3° N	55.4° E	9 km
