= Jules Baillaud =

French astronomer

Jules Baillaud (14 January 1876, Paris – 28 November 1960) was a French astronomer. Initially assistant astronomer in Lyon (1900–1904) and at the Paris observatory: assistant astronomer until 1925, he went on as astronomer from 1925 to 1947. From 1937 to 1947 he was also the director of the Pic du Midi observatory and directed the Carte du Ciel from 1922 to 1947.

Baillaud was the President of the Société astronomique de France (SAF), the French astronomical society, from 1935-1937. In 1938, he received the Prix Jules Janssen, the Society's highest award.

The asteroid (1280) Baillauda is named in his memory, while the Baillaud crater on the Moon, and Baillaud asteroid (11764) Benbaillaud, were named after his father Benjamin Baillaud.

== Bibliography ==
- Dr Frank Duprat. Le Calendrier conceptionnel de la femme, de la conception volontaire à la procréation volontaire du sexe. Avant-propos de M. Jules Baillaud.[4e édition.] (2) Bibliothèque nationale de France
- Notice sur les travaux scientifiques de M. Jules Baillaud (2) Bibliothèque nationale de France
- Les courbes spectrales étalons (1) Bibliothèque nationale de France
- Le développement des études de botanique à l'Observatoire du Pic-du-Midi, travaux sur la reproduction de la pomme de terre, une source de richesses : la reproduction des pommes de terre par semis de graines, résultats obtenus par M. Joseph Bouget dans la haute vallée de l'Adour, leurs conséquences pour l'avenir (1) Bibliothèque nationale de France
- La Méthode de l'échelle de teintes en photométrie photographique : application à l'étude de l'étalon lumineux à acétylène, par M. Jules Baillaud (1) Bibliothèque nationale de France
- Jules Baillaud, astronome titulaire à l'Observatoire de Paris. Quelques appareils de sensitométrie et de photométrie photographiques (1) Bibliothèque nationale de France
- André Giret,... L'Astronomie actuelle et la notion de Dieu. Préface de Jules Baillaud,... (1) Bibliothèque nationale de France manuel de topometrie operations sur le terrain et calculs (1) Bibliothèque nationale de France
- Observatoire de Paris. Tables de précession pour des changements d'équinoxede 25 et de 50 ans et pour tout autre changement d'équinoxe. [Introduction de Jules Baillaud.] (1) Bibliothèque nationale de France
- Manuel de vulgarisation pratique (1) Bibliothèque nationale de France

== Sources ==
- http://viaf.org/viaf/95321468/
