= Barrow (crater) =

Lunar impact crater

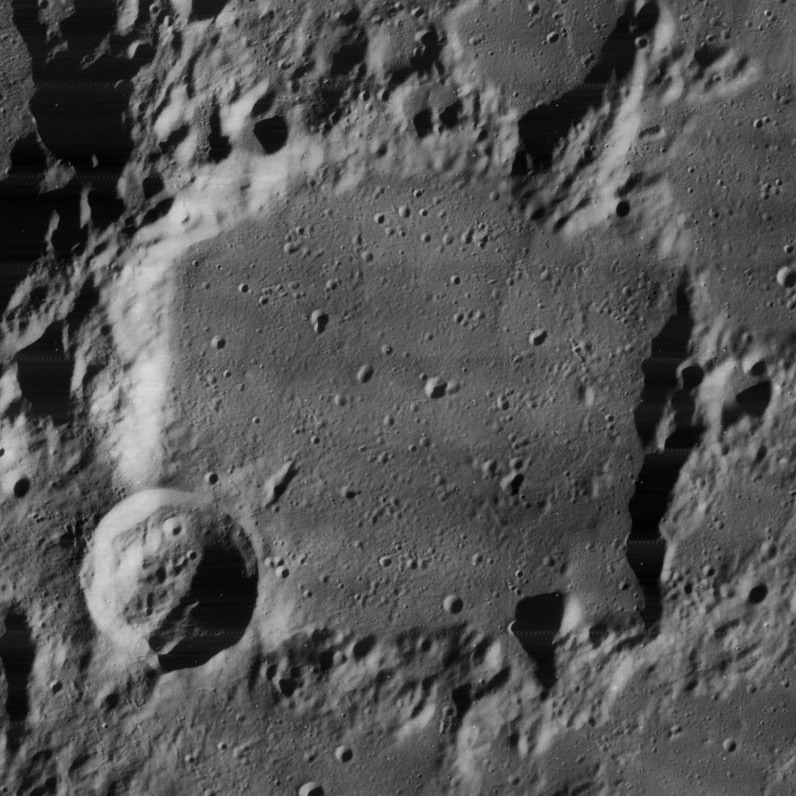
- Lunar Orbiter 4 image
- Coordinates: 71.3°N 7.7°E
- Diameter: 93.82 km (58.30 mi)
- Depth: 3.2 km
- Colongitude: 355° at sunrise
- Formation: Pre-Nectarian
- Eponym: Isaac Barrow

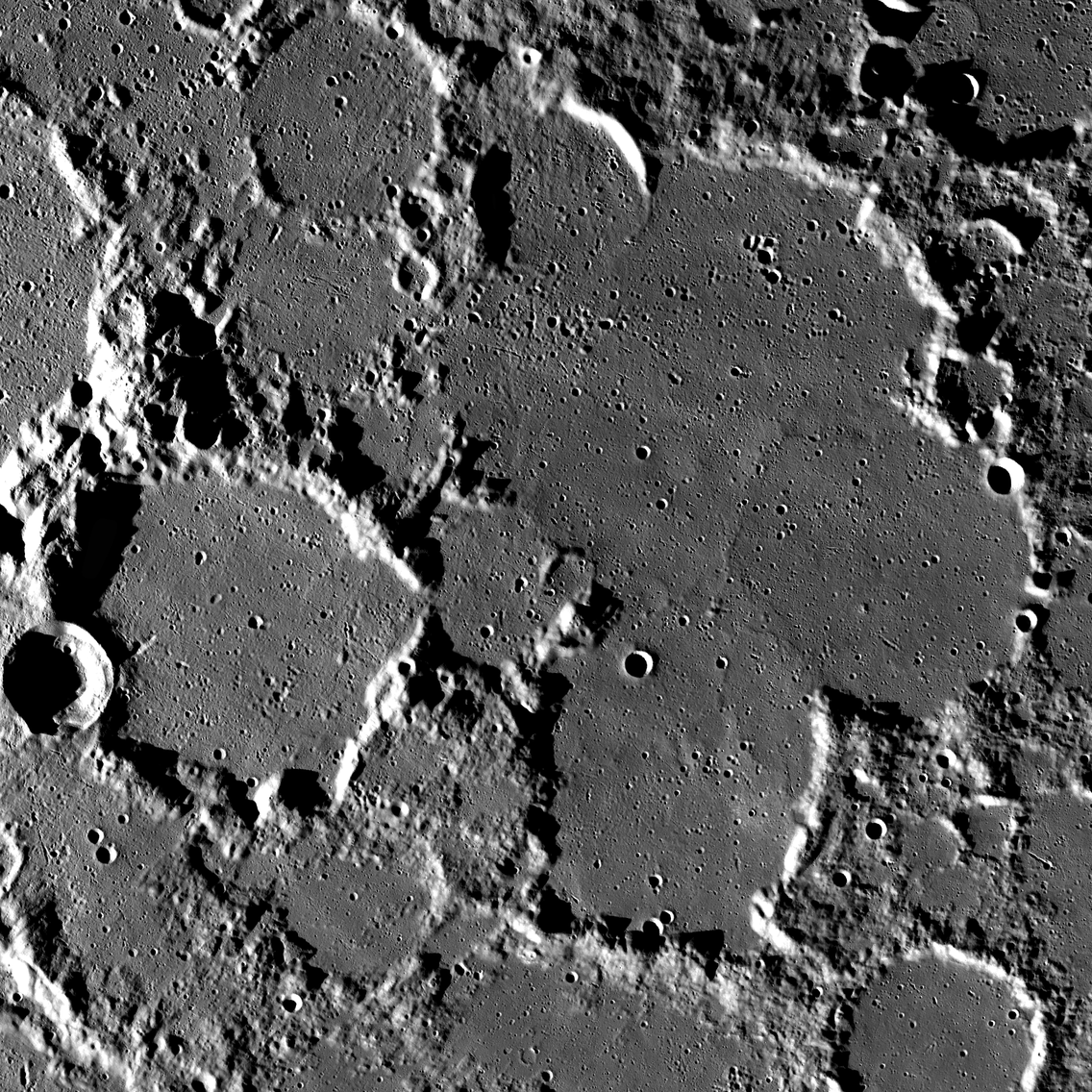
LRO image of Meton (right) and Barrow

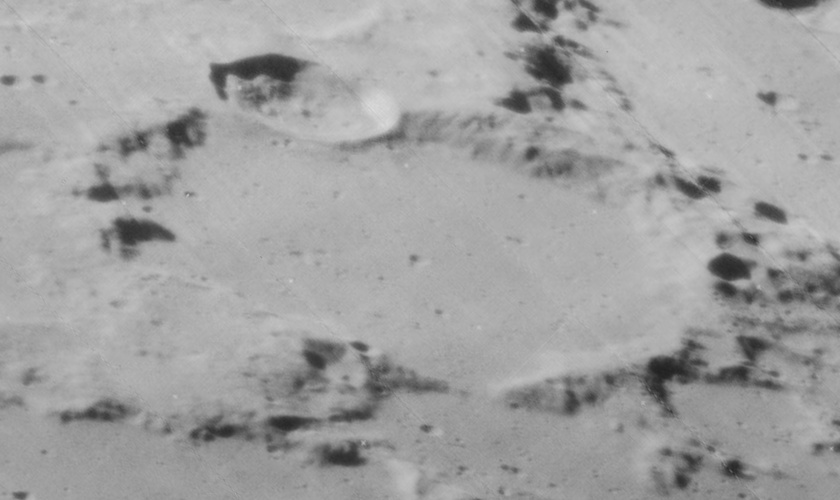
Oblique view from Lunar Orbiter 4

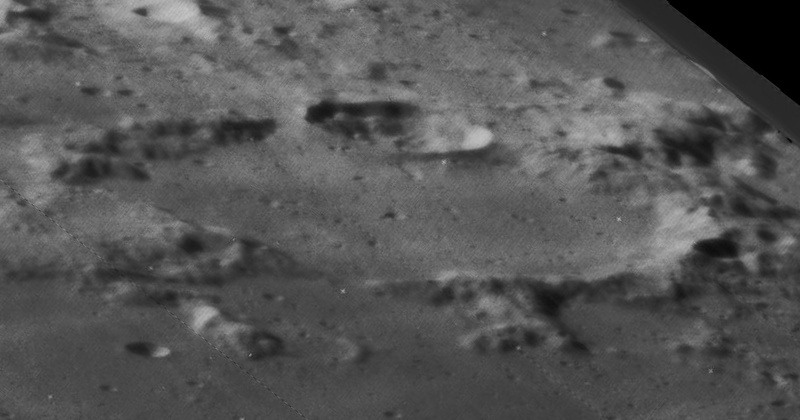
Another oblique view from Lunar Orbiter 4

Barrow is an old lunar impact crater that is located near the northern limb of the Moon. It lies between the crater Goldschmidt to the northwest and the irregular formation Meton to the northeast. To the southwest is W. Bond.

On the lunar geologic timescale, this crater dates to the Pre-Nectarian epoch. This crater has been described as having a "notably square outline". The outer wall of Barrow has been heavily eroded by subsequent impacts, and reshaped by intruding craters. As a result, the rim now resembles a ring of rounded hills and peaks surrounding the flat interior. The younger satellite crater Barrow A lies across the southwest rim.

At the eastern end of the crater is a narrow gap in the rim that joins the floor to the adjacent crater Meton. The rim achieves its maximum height and extend in the northwest, where it is joined to Goldschmidt. Linear troughs in the southern rim are associated with ejecta from the formation of the Imbrium basin. This unusual rim region has been described as wave-like.

The interior of Barrow has been resurfaced by basalt flows, leaving a flat surface that is marked by many tiny craterlets. Faint traces of ray material from Anaxagoras to the west forms streaks across the floor of Barrow.

This crater is named after British mathematician Isaac Barrow (1630–1677). His name was introduced into lunar nomenclature during the 19th century by German astronomer Johann Mädler. Its designation was formally adopted by the International Astronomical Union in 1935.

== Satellite craters ==
By convention these features are identified on lunar maps by placing the letter on the side of the crater midpoint that is closest to Barrow.

Barrow	Latitude	Longitude	Diameter
A	70.5° N	3.8° E	28 km
B	70.1° N	10.5° E	16 km
C	73.1° N	11.1° E	29 km
E	68.9° N	3.3° E	18 km
F	69.1° N	1.8° E	19 km
G	70.1° N	0.2° E	30 km
H	69.2° N	6.0° E	5 km
K	69.2° N	11.8° E	46 km
M	67.6° N	9.2° E	6 km
