= Euctemon (crater) =

Lunar impact crater

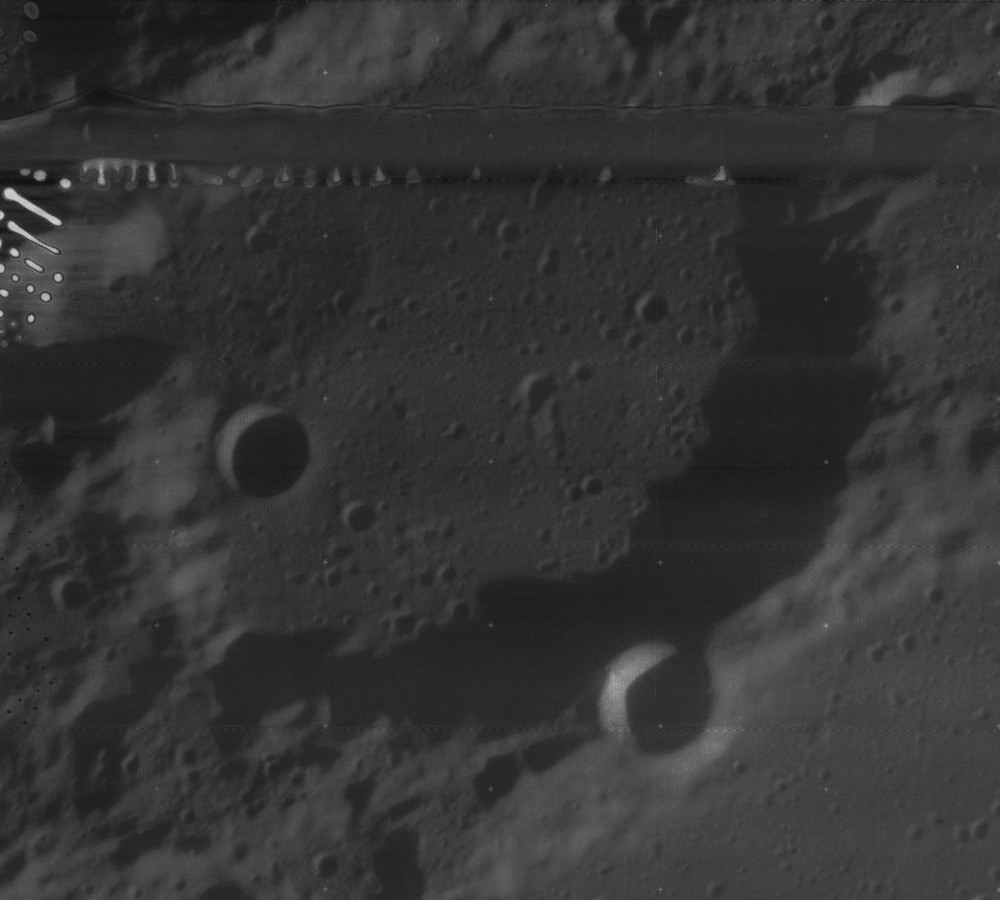
- Lunar Orbiter 4 image (band at top and streaks in upper left are blemishes on original image)
- Coordinates: 76.4°N 31.3°E
- Diameter: 62.70 km (38.96 mi)
- Depth: Unknown
- Colongitude: 334° at sunrise
- Eponym: Euctemon

Euctemon is a lunar impact crater that is located in the northern part of the Moon, along the northwest rim of the crater Baillaud. To the southwest of Euctemon is the large walled plain Meton, and to the north-northeast lies the crater De Sitter. Due to its location, Euctemon appears foreshortened when viewed from the Earth.

The interior floor of this crater has been resurfaced some time following the original formation, leaving a nearly level, featureless plain surrounded by the worn outer rim. This floor is marked only by a number of tiny craterlets, and the small crater Euctemon K near the southwest inner wall. A small crater has cut through the western rim, and has joined with the main crater by a gap in its eastern rim. The two craters now share a common floor. Just to the north is another small crater, Euctemon H, that now forms a wide cleft through the rim. Along the ridge that separates Euctemon from Baillaud is perched the small crater Euctemon N.

This formation is named after Greek astronomer Euctemon (unknown–fl. 432 B.C.). His name was incorporated into the lunar nomenclature of Italian astronomer Giovanni B. Riccioli in 1651. Its designation was officially adopted by the International Astronomical Union in 1935.

== Satellite craters ==
Euctemon satellite features and surroundings

By convention these features are identified on lunar maps by placing the letter on the side of the crater midpoint that is closest to Euctemon.

Euctemon	Latitude	Longitude	Diameter
C	76.2° N	38.9° E	20 km
D	77.1° N	39.2° E	20 km
H	76.3° N	26.6° E	16 km
K	75.9° N	28.4° E	7 km
N	75.5° N	33.1° E	8 km
