= Euctemon =

Athenian astronomer

Euctemon (Greek: Εὐκτήμων, gen. Εὐκτήμονος; fl. 432 BC) was an Athenian astronomer. He was a contemporary and collaborator of Meton, who developed the 19-year Metonic cycle, which synchronises 235 lunar months with 19 solar years to form the basis of ancient Greek calendrical systems. Little is known of his work apart from his partnership with Meton and what is mentioned by Ptolemy. With Meton, he made a series of observations of the solstices (the time or date (twice each year) at which the sun reaches its maximum or minimum declination, marked by the longest and shortest days (about 21 June and 22 December) in order to determine the length of the tropical year). Geminus and Ptolemy quote him as a source on the rising and setting of the stars. Pausanias's Description of Greece names Damon and Philogenes as the children of Euctemon.

The lunar crater Euctemon is named after him.
