= Meton (crater) =

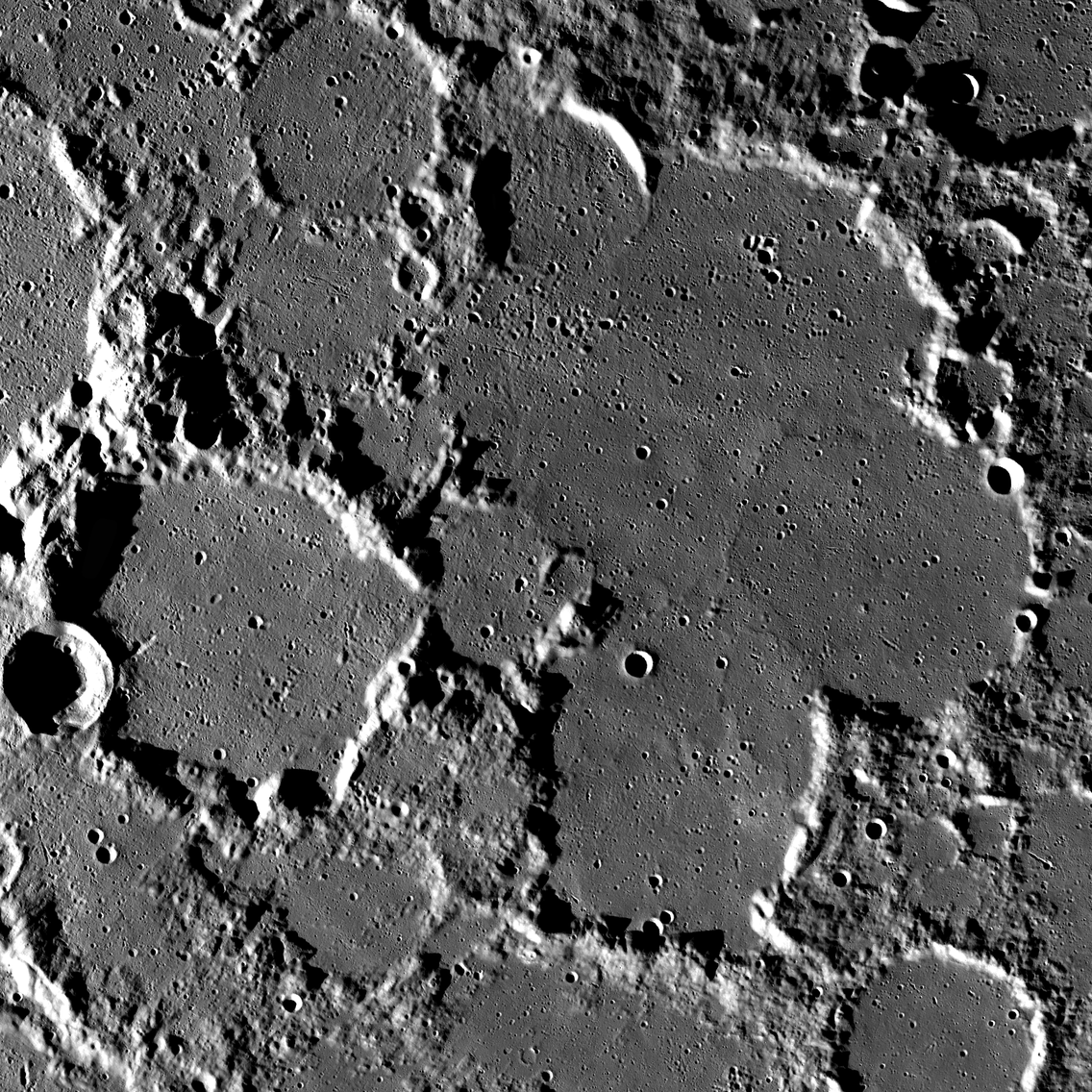
- LRO image Meton (right) and Barrow (left)
- Coordinates: 73.8°N 19.2°E
- Diameter: 122 km
- Depth: 2.6 km
- Colongitude: 338° at sunrise
- Eponym: Meton

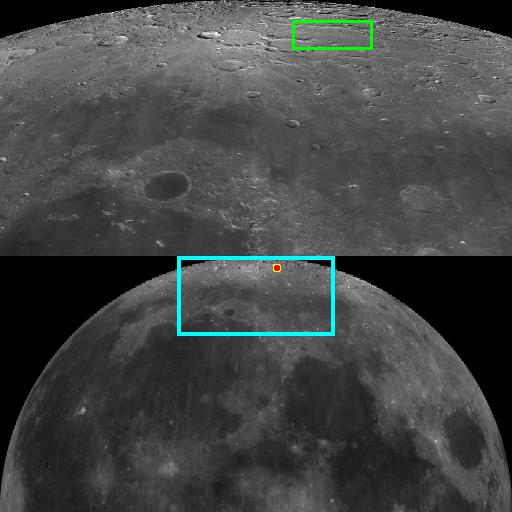
Location of Meton

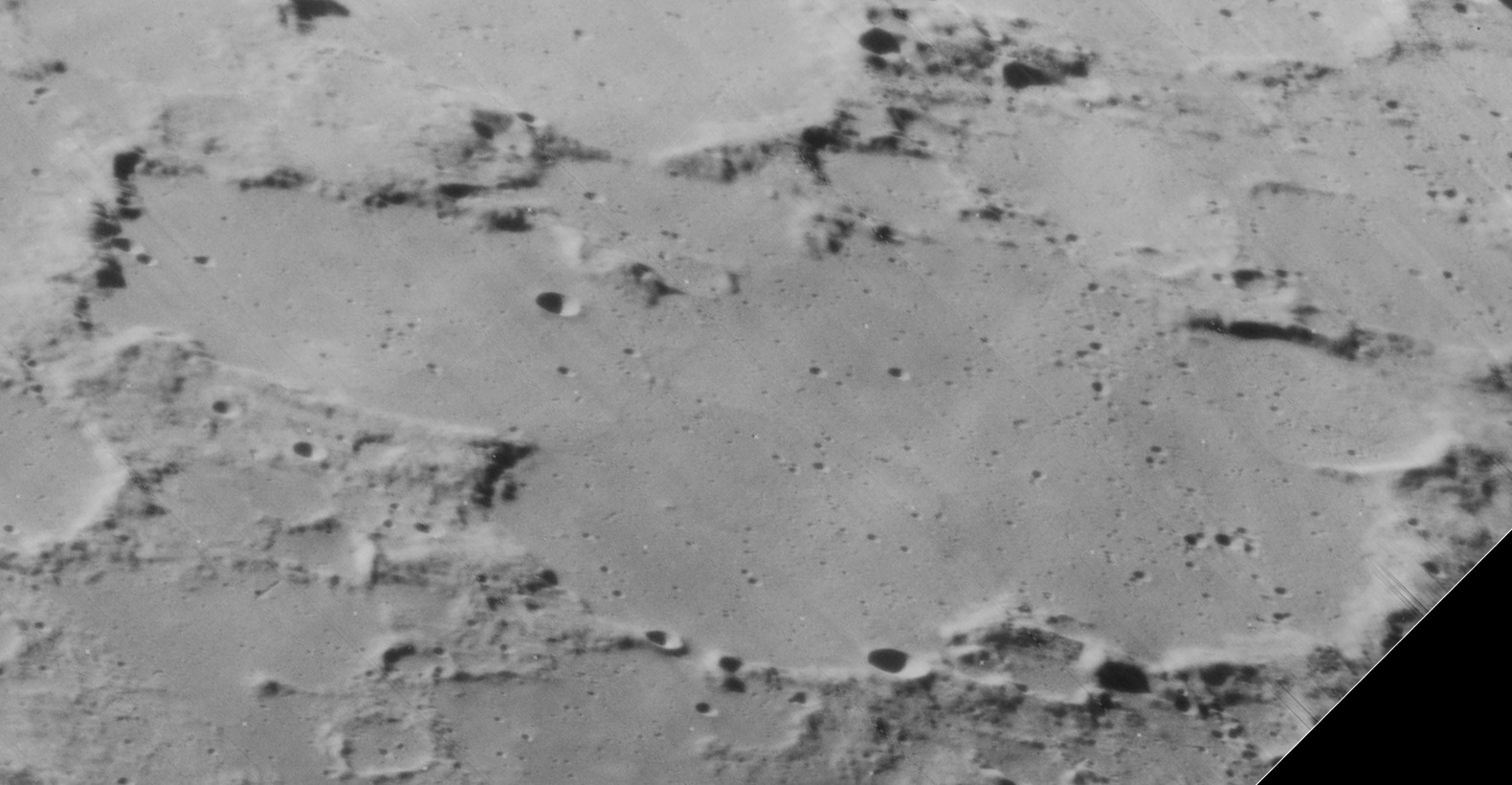
Oblique view of Meton from Lunar Orbiter 4. Meton is below center, Meton D is below left of center, Meton C is in upper left, and Meton E is at right. They are all flooded to the same elevation, and the subtle ridges that divide these craters are barely visible in this image.

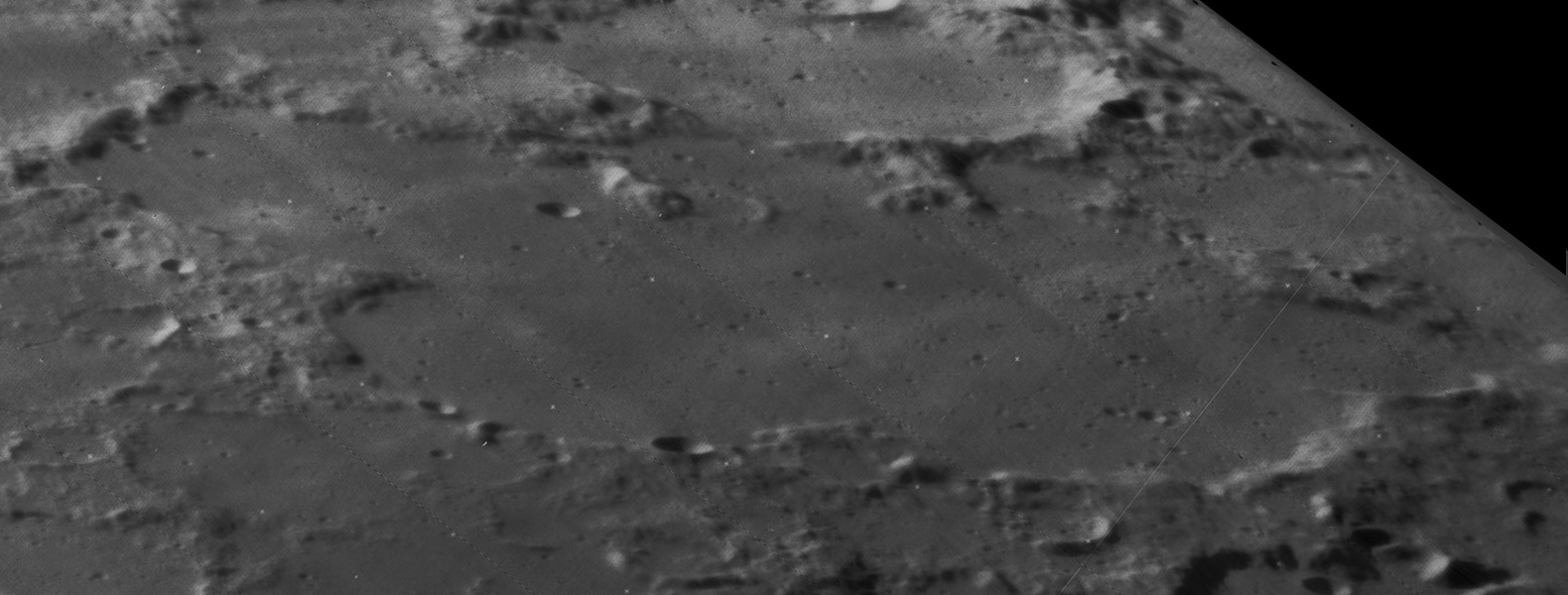
Another oblique from Lunar Orbiter 4. Barrow crater is in the background.

Meton is a compound formation on the Moon that consists of several merged crater rings that have been flooded with basalt, forming the remnant of a walled plain in the shape of a clover leaf. It is located near the northern lunar limb, and is viewed from a low angle and foreshortened. The crater Barrow is attached to the southwest rim. To the northwest is the crater Scoresby, and to the east are Baillaud and Euctemon.

Linear troughs in the southern rim are associated with ejecta from the formation of the Imbrium basin.

== Satellite craters ==
By convention these features are identified on lunar maps by placing the letter on the side of the crater midpoint that is closest to Meton.

Meton	Latitude	Longitude	Diameter
A	73.3° N	31.3° E	14 km
B	71.2° N	18.0° E	6 km
C	70.6° N	19.0° E	77 km
D	72.2° N	24.7° E	78 km
E	75.3° N	15.3° E	42 km
F	72.0° N	14.2° E	51 km
G	72.9° N	28.4° E	10 km
W	67.4° N	17.3° E	7 km
