= Epigenes of Byzantium =

3rd-century BC Greek astrologer

Epigenes of Byzantium (Greek: Έπιγένης ὁ Βυζάντιος; unknown-circa 200 BC) was a Greek astrologer. He seems to have been an earlier supporter of astrology, which, though derided by many Greek intellectuals, came to be accepted after Alexander the Great conquered major parts of the Near East.

The sources for the life of Epigenes are Seneca the Younger (c. 65 AD), Pliny the Elder (c. 77 AD), and Censorinus (c. 238 AD).

Epigenes' claims to have been educated by the Chaldeans comes from the writings of Seneca. Pliny the Elder writes that Epigenes attests to the fact that the Chaldeans preserved astral observations in inscriptions upon brick tiles (coctilibus laterculis) extending to a period of 720 years. Pliny calls Epigenes a writer of first-rate authority (gravis auctor imprimis). Smith interprets this to mean that Epigenes came before Berossus.

Epigenes refined the study of his chosen field, defining Saturn, for example, as "cold and windy." Along with Apollonius of Myndus and Artemidorus of Parium, he boasted of having been instructed by the Chaldean priest-astrologers.

The 55-km lunar crater Epigenes is named after him.

== See also ==
- Hellenistic astrology
