= Fontenelle (crater) =

Crater on the Moon

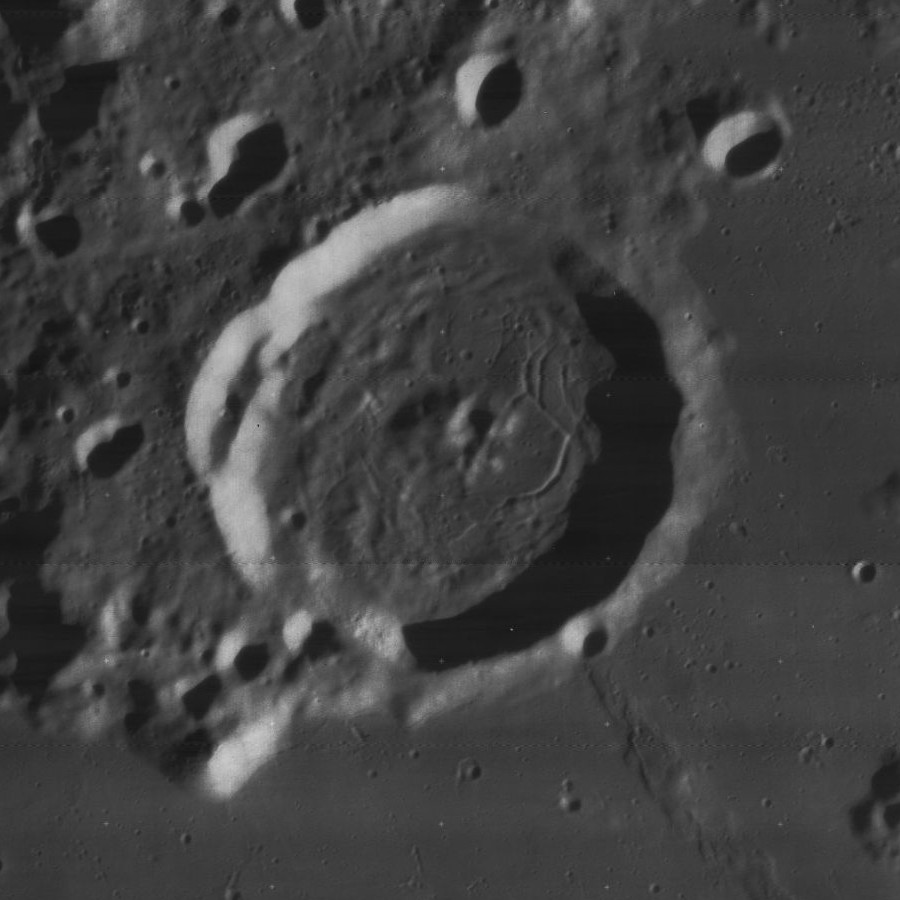
- Lunar Orbiter 4 image
- Coordinates: 63.42°N 18.96°W
- Diameter: 37.68 km (23.41 mi)
- Depth: 2.18 km (1.35 mi)
- Colongitude: 19° at sunrise
- Eponym: Bernard Fontenelle

Fontenelle is a lunar impact crater that is located along the northern edge of Mare Frigoris, in the northern part of the Moon. To the northeast is the remnant of the crater Birmingham. Due to its location, this crater appears oval in shape when observed from the Earth because of foreshortening.

The bright-walled rim of this crater is generally circular, but the edge is irregular and in some locations has a notched appearance. This is particularly true along the southwest and the eastern edges. The rim projects above the surface of the Mare Frigoris, and a wrinkle ridge trends for over 100 km to the southeast from the edge. The interior of Fontenelle has a fractured floor. There is a low, wide central hill at the midpoint, and some rough ground to the west of this rise. A craterlet along the eastern face of this central rise forms a distinctive feature.

To the south of Fontenelle on the lunar mare is a small, unnamed crater (about 4.5 km diameter) that is surrounded by a ray system of high albedo material. This crater displays a resemblance to Linné on Mare Serenitatis. This feature lies about 15 kilometers north-northwest of Fontenelle G.

To the east of this crater is an unusual geometric configuration in the surface with an angular shape. This came to be known as "Mädler's Square", after the lunar selenographer Johann Mädler. It is roughly square in shape, but appears lozenge-shaped due to foreshortening.

The crater is named after French astronomer Bernard le Bovier de Fontenelle (1657-1757). Its designation was formally adopted by the International Astronomical Union in 1935.

== Satellite craters ==
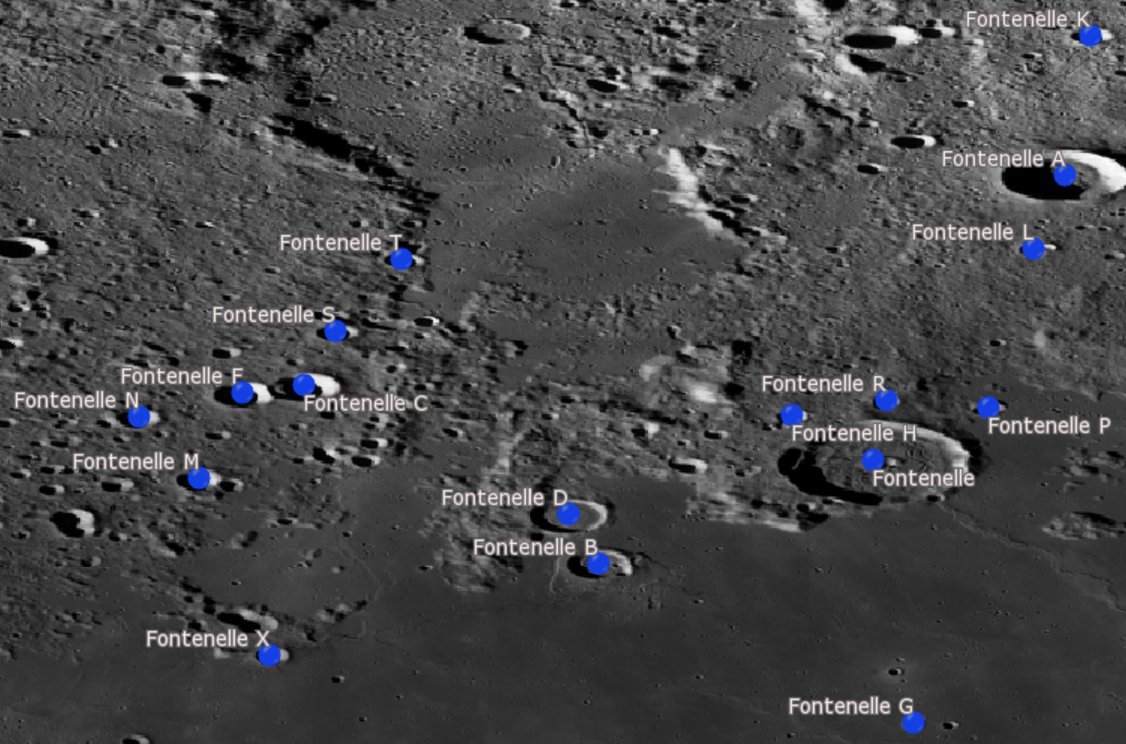
Fontenelle satellite features and surroundings

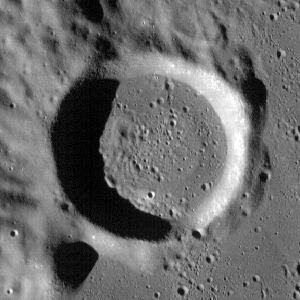
Fontenelle D

By convention these features are identified on lunar maps by placing the letter on the side of the crater midpoint that is closest to Fontenelle.

Fontenelle	Latitude	Longitude	Diameter
A	67.5° N	16.1° W	21 km
B	61.9° N	23.0° W	14 km
C	64.4° N	27.2° W	13 km
D	62.5° N	23.4° W	17 km
F	64.4° N	28.2° W	11 km
G	59.5° N	18.3° W	4 km
H	64.1° N	20.1° W	6 km
K	69.6° N	15.6° W	7 km
L	66.5° N	16.6° W	6 km
M	63.1° N	28.8° W	9 km
N	64.0° N	29.7° W	8 km
P	64.1° N	17.2° W	6 km
R	64.3° N	18.8° W	6 km
S	65.3° N	26.7° W	7 km
T	66.3° N	25.7° W	7 km
X	60.5° N	27.8° W	7 km

Fontenelle D is classified as a concentric (double-walled) crater. A 400-km long crater chain starts near this satellite crater and passes northwest of Fontenelle.
