= James Challis =

English physicist and astronomer (1803–1882)

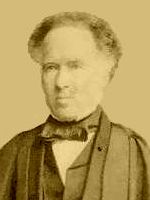
- Born: 12 December 1803; Braintree, Essex, England
- Died: 3 December 1882 (aged 78); Cambridge, England
- Known for: Not discovering Neptune
- Scientific career
- Fields: Astronomy
- Workplaces: Cambridge Observatory

James Challis FRS (12 December 1803 – 3 December 1882) was an English clergyman, physicist and astronomer. Plumian Professor of Astronomy and Experimental Philosophy and the director of the Cambridge Observatory, he investigated a wide range of physical phenomena though made few lasting contributions outside astronomy. He is best remembered for his missed opportunity to discover the planet Neptune in 1846.

== Early life ==
Challis was born in Braintree, Essex where his father, John Challis, was a stonemason. After attending various local schools, he graduated from Trinity College, Cambridge in 1825 as Senior Wrangler and first Smith's prizeman. He was elected a fellow of Trinity in 1826 and was ordained in 1830. He held the benefice of Papworth Everard, Cambridgeshire from the college until 1852. In 1831 Challis married Sarah Copsey, née Chandler, a widow, and consequently resigned his Trinity fellowship. The couple had a son and a daughter.

== Plumian professor ==
In 1836, he became director of the Cambridge Observatory and Plumian Professor, holding the latter post until his death. He lectured in all areas of physics. As examiner for the Smith's prize, he appraised the early work of G. G. Stokes, Arthur Cayley, John Couch Adams, William Thomson (later Lord Kelvin), Peter Guthrie Tait and James Clerk Maxwell. For over a decade, in correspondence and publications, Challis repeatedly disagreed with Stokes's conclusions from his research.

Challis was referee for Thomson and for Stokes in their respective applications for chairs at the University of Glasgow, and for Maxwell at Aberdeen. He and Thomson together set and examined the Adams prize topic on Saturn's rings, won by Maxwell in 1857.

== Cambridge Observatory ==
Challis succeeded George Biddell Airy at the observatory and gradually improved the instrumentation and accuracy of observations. He made some early observations of the fracture of comet 3D/Biela into two pieces on 15 January 1846 and re-observed both fragments in 1852. He published over 60 scientific papers recording other observations of comets and asteroids. He invented the meteoroscope (1848) and the transit-reducer (1849). Challis published twelve volumes of Astronomical Observations Made at the Observatory of Cambridge.

He and his wife lived at the observatory as genial hosts for 25 years, though Challis once left his wife to guard an intruder while he summoned assistance. Challis eventually resigned the observatory post because of the chronic stress that his inability to keep up with processing new astronomical observations was causing him. His predecessor Airy had taken a more relaxed attitude. He was succeeded by Adams though he maintained his professorship until his death.

== The search for the eighth planet ==
In 1846, Airy finally persuaded a skeptical Challis to join in the search for an eighth planet in the Solar System. Adams had predicted the location of such a planet as early as 1844, based on irregularities in the orbit of Uranus. Adams failed to promote his prediction successfully and there was little enthusiasm for a systematic search of the heavens until Airy's intervention. Challis finally began his, somewhat reluctant, search in July 1846, unaware that Frenchman Urbain Le Verrier had independently made an identical prediction. German astronomer Johann Gottfried Galle, assisted by Heinrich Louis d'Arrest, finally confirmed Le Verrier's prediction on 23 September. The planet was named "Neptune". It soon became apparent from Challis's notebooks that he had observed Neptune twice, a month earlier, failing to make the identification through lack of diligence and a current star chart.

Challis was full of remorse but blamed his neglect on the pressing business of catching up on the backlog of astronomical observations from the observatory. As he reflected in a letter to Airy of 12 October 1846:

I have been greatly mortified to find that my observations would have shewn me the planet in the early part of August if I had only discussed them. ... I delayed doing this ... chiefly because I was making a grand effort to reduce the vast numbers of comet observations which I have accumulated and this occupied the whole of my time.

== Physicist ==
Challis also worked in hydrodynamics and in optics where he supported the wave theory of light and advanced the theory of a luminiferous ether as a medium for its propagation. However, he rejected the idea that the ether was an elastic solid, insisting that it was a fluid, bringing him into conflict with Airy and Stokes. Driven by Sir Isaac Newton's somewhat obscure assertion of "a certain most subtle spirit which pervades and lies hid in all gross bodies", Challis was driven to attempt to derive all physical phenomena from a model of inert spherical atoms embedded in an elastic fluid ether, an enterprise described as an attempt at a "Victorian unified field theory". His work included a mechanical explanation of gravitation. His ideas won few supporters.

== Theological views ==
Challis took issue with Charles Wycliffe Goodwin's views on Genesis expressed in Essays and Reviews (1860). Challis saw Genesis as an "antecedent plan" for creation, rather than a literal chronology, and argued that the biblical account could be reconciled with the geological record. He went on to interpret the word "law", as used in a spiritual sense by Saint Paul, in the sense of scientific law.

== Assessment ==
Challis published 225 papers in mathematics, physics and astronomy. He was re-elected fellow of Trinity in 1870. He died in Cambridge and was buried beside his wife in Mill Road Cemetery, Cambridge. His wealth when he died was £781 (equivalent to £81,200 in 2025).

Despite the embarrassment over Neptune, Challis did make genuine contributions to astronomy. His blend of theology and science was in the spirit of Stokes, and his search for a unified theory akin to the endeavours of Thomson and Maxwell. However, despite his tenacity in advocating his physical and theological theories, they had little impact, and in fact Richard Carrington credited him as his professor with inspiring his decision to pursue astronomy rather than become a clergyman. Olin J. Eggen claimed that "At a later time, or under less amiable circumstances, he would have been branded a charlatan. He would now be as forgotten as his peculiar ideas had not the events surrounding the discovery of Neptune in 1845 given him a genuine opportunity for scientific immortality. But he fumbled it."

== Honours and memorials ==
- Fellow of the Royal Astronomical Society, (1836);
- Fellow of the Royal Society, (1848);
- Bronze medal at The Great Exhibition for his transit-reducer, (1851).
- Lunar crater Challis is named after him.

== Bibliography ==
- Challis, J. (1861) Creation in Plan and Progress
- Challis, J. (1869). Notes on the Principles of Pure and Applied Calculation; and Applications of Mathematical Principles to Theories of the Physical Forces. Cambridge: Deighton, Bell and Co.
- Challis, J. (1871) A Translation of the Epistle of the Apostle Paul to the Romans
- Challis, J. (1873) An Essay on the Mathematical Principles of Physics
- Challis, J. (1875) Remarks on the Cambridge Mathematical Studies
- Challis, J. (1879) Lectures on Practical Astronomy and Astronomical Instruments
- Challis, J. (1880) Essay on the Scriptural Doctrine of Immortality

=== Obituary ===
- J. W. L. G. (1882–83) "James Challis" Monthly Notices of the Royal Astronomical Society, 43: 160–79

=== About Challis ===
- [Anon.] (2001) "Challis, James", Encyclopædia Britannica, CDROM Deluxe edition
- Clerke, A. M. (2006) "Challis, James (1803–1882)", rev. David B. Wilson, Oxford Dictionary of National Biography, Oxford University Press, online edn, Oct 2006, accessed 17 September 2007 (subscription, Wikipedia Library access or UK public library membership required)
- Eggen, O. J. (1970–1981) "Challis, James" in Gillispie, Charles Coulston, ed. (1981). Dictionary of Scientific Biography. New York: Charles Scribner's Sons. pp. 186–187. ISBN 0-684-16970-3.
- Standage, Tom (2000). The Neptune File: Planet Detectives and the Discovery of Worlds Unseen. London: Allen Lane. ISBN 0-7139-9472-X.
