= Anaxagoras (crater) =

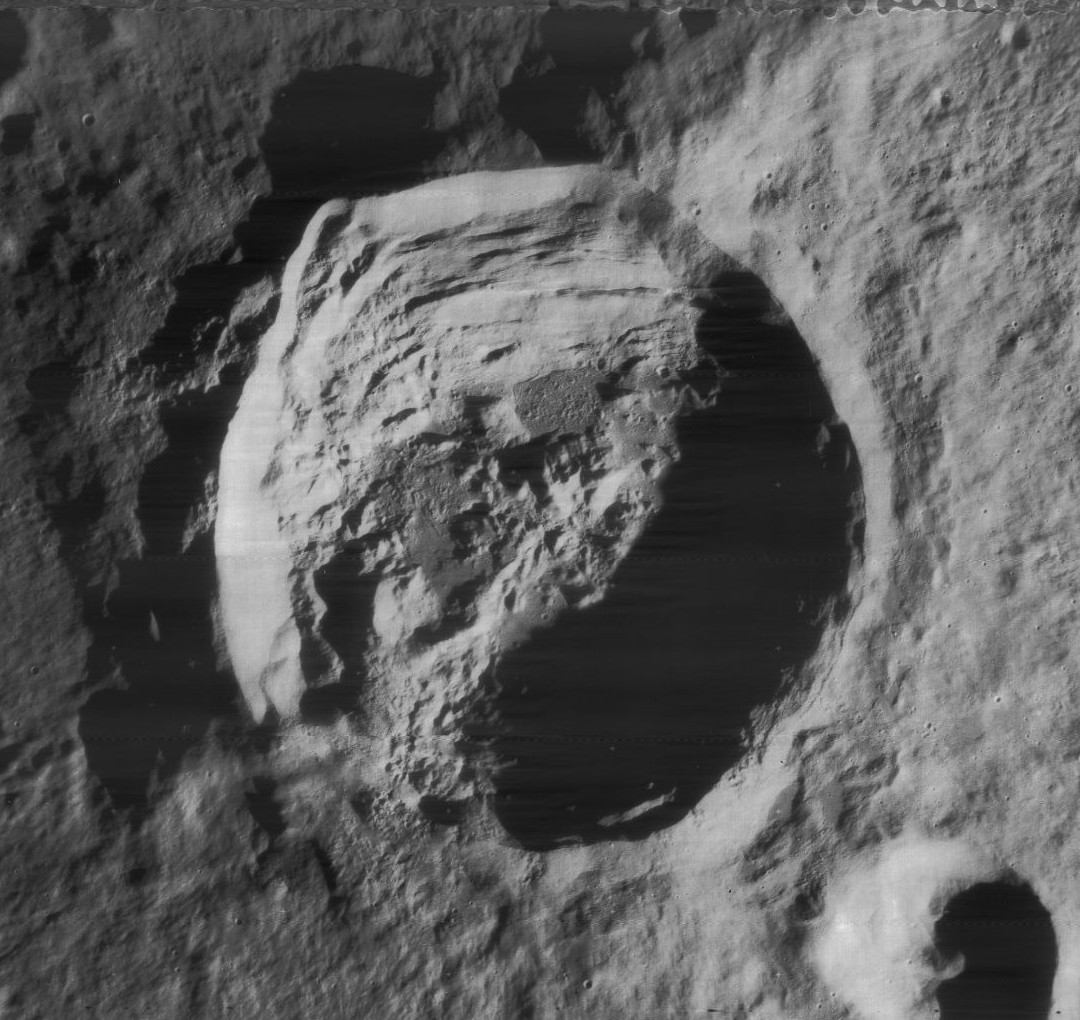
- Lunar Orbiter 4 image
- Coordinates: 73.48°N 10.17°W
- Diameter: 51.90 km
- Depth: 3.0 km
- Colongitude: 11° at sunrise
- Formation: Copernican
- Eponym: Anaxagoras

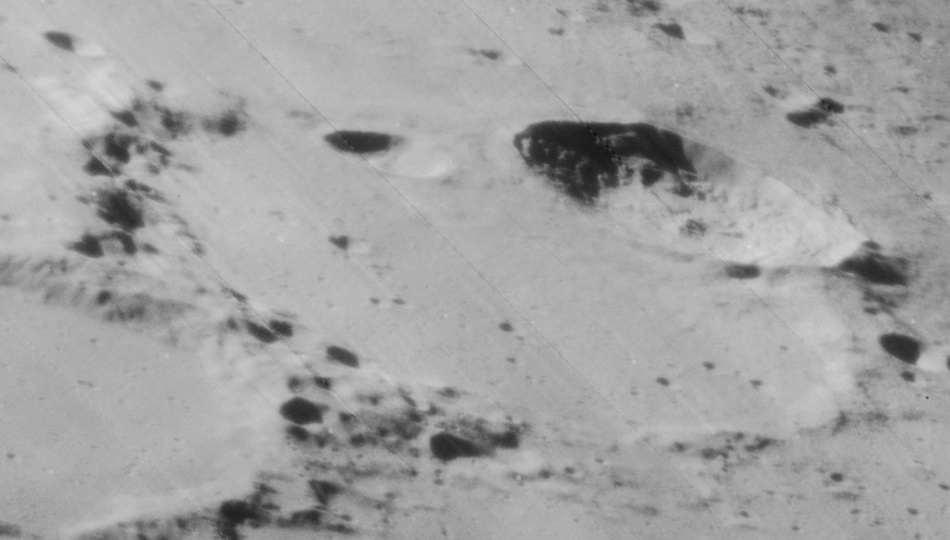
Oblique view from Lunar Orbiter 4, with Goldschmidt and Anaxagoras in upper right

Anaxagoras is a young lunar impact crater that is located near the north pole of the Moon. It lies across the larger and more heavily worn crater Goldschmidt. To the south-southeast is Epigenes, and due south is the worn remains of Birmingham. Since 1900, only one instance of lunar transient phenomenon has been reported in association with this crater.

Anaxagoras is a relatively recent impact crater that is young enough to still possess a ray system that has not been eroded by space weathering. The rays from the site reach a distance of over 900 kilometers from the rim, reaching Plato to the south. It is consequently mapped as part of the Copernican System. Based on the spectra, this impact appears to have exposed anorthosite from below the more mafic surface covering.

The crater interior has a relatively high albedo, making it a prominent feature when the Moon is nearly full. (The high latitude of the crater means that the Sun always remains close to the horizon even at maximum elevation less than a day after Full Moon.) The interior walls are steep and possess a system of terraces. The central peak is offset from the crater midpoint, and joins a low range across the crater floor. In fact, it appears that some of the central peak material has landed outside the crater rim. The infrared spectrum of pure crystalline plagioclase has been identified on the central peak, floor, and ejecta to the northeast.

This crater is named after the Greek astronomer Anaxagoras (500–428 B.C.). He postulated that the Moon had a rocky, irregular surface similar to Earth. Its designation was formally adopted by the International Astronomical Union in 1935. When Giovanni Ricciolli introduced the name into lunar nomenclature in 1651, he instead applied the name to the feature that is now called Goldschmidt.

== Satellite craters ==
By convention these features are identified on lunar maps by placing the letter on the side of the crater midpoint that is closest to Anaxagoras.

Anaxagoras	Latitude	Longitude	Diameter
A	72.2° N	6.9° W	18 km
B	70.3° N	11.4° W	5 km
