= John Birmingham (astronomer) =

Irish astronomer

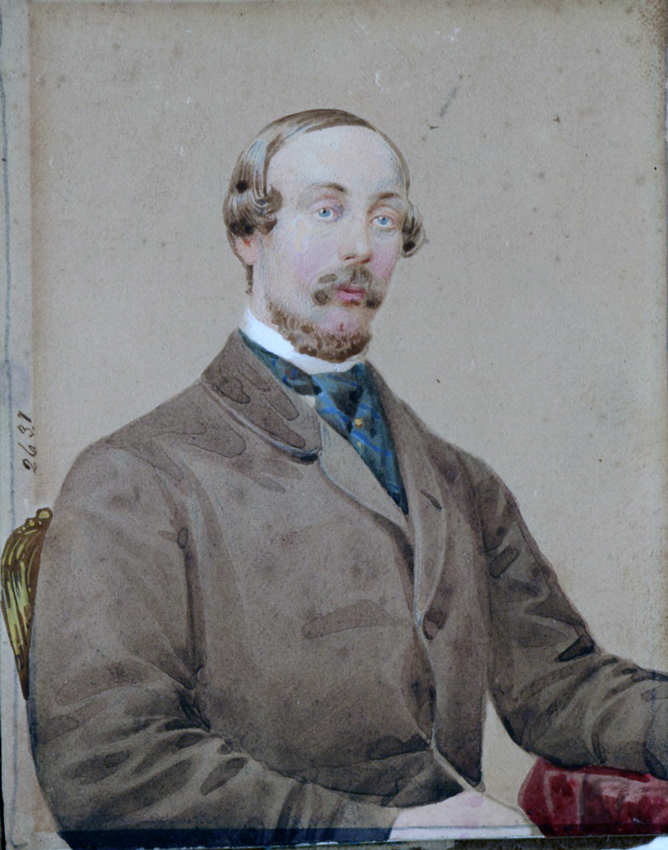
- Born: May 1816; Millbrook Estate near Milltown, County Galway, Ireland
- Died: 7 September 1884 (aged 67–68); Millbrook Estate, County Galway, Ireland
- Awards: Cunningham Medal (Royal Irish Academy, 1884)

John Birmingham (1816–1884) was an Irish astronomer, amateur geologist, polymath and poet. He spent several years (from about 1844 to 1854) travelling widely in Europe where he became proficient in several languages. In 1866, he discovered the recurrent nova T Coronae Borealis. He studied and wrote articles on planets, meteor showers and sunspots.

== Early years ==
He was born to Edward Birmingham and Elly Bell and grew up on the Millbrook Estate outside Milltown, County Galway and was educated at St Jarlath's College in Tuam. The Birmingham Family held one of the oldest titles in Ireland and were the last Barons Of Athenry and Earls Of Louth. Between 1844 and 1854 he spent several years travelling through Europe, and is thought to have studied in Berlin. In 1846 and 1847 he was active in Famine relief around Tuam. In 1852 he visited Rome. When he returned home in 1854 he built up a network of newspapers and magazines to which he started contributing articles on scientific and other matters. He first attracted attention with his articles on sedimentary rocks in the west of Ireland which he contributed to the Journal of the Geological Society of Dublin.

He inherited part of the Millbrook estate, which was scattered across Galway and Mayo, in 1865, and settled at Millbrook House with two elderly aunts and a maternal uncle, Arthur Bell, who assisted him in his research. He became known as a kindly landlord but also as a scholar and intellectual. From 1858, he started contributing notes on astronomy to local newspapers. At Millbrook he built what The Tuam Herald called a large wooden house with a sliding roof, which formed his first observatory. On 12 May 1866, he discovered the variable star T Coronae Borealis in the constellation Corona Borealis. The success of this find led him to acquire a powerful new telescope from Thomas Cooke of York (which cost £120), fitted with a lens made by Thomas Grubb of Dublin.

== Birmingham lunar crater ==
In 1866, he wrote an essay about the disappearance of a crater on the surface of the Moon and the subsequent appearance of a vast luminous cloud in its place. In its review of the essay, The Irish Times commented: “We know of no paper which contains an equal amount of learning in so brief a space, in so charming a style and manner, and stamps him as a man of learning, eloquence and refined taste combined with genius.” In 1883, the Royal Irish Academy presented Birmingham with a gold medal for his valuable contributions to the society's transactions.

The lunar crater Birmingham is located near the northern limb of the Moon, and so is viewed from the Earth at a low angle. All that survives of the original formation is an irregular perimeter of low, indented ridges surrounding the lava-resurfaced interior. The inner floor is marked by several tiny craterlets, and the surface is unusually rough for a walled plain. The low angle of illumination allows fine details of this boulder-strewn field to be seen more clearly. The Birmingham formation lies just to the north of the Mare Frigoris, and to the east of the W. Bond walled-plain.

== Study of red stars ==
John Birmingham, using a 4.5-inch (110 mm) Cooke refractor, made a special study of red stars and revised and extended Schjellerup's Catalogue of Red Stars. Six hundred and fifty eight of these objects were included.

He presented this work to the Royal Irish Academy in 1876 and was awarded the academy's Cunningham Medal in 1884. In 1881 he discovered a deep red star in the constellation Cygnus. This star is named after him. Other subjects on which he published articles included meteor showers, the transit of Venus and sunspots. He had correspondence with other leading astronomers.

== Personal life ==
John Birmingham was an only child. He never married but he was reputed to have fathered a daughter. He died at the Millbrook Estate on 7 September 1884 and his house was left to ruin. Birmingham was a devout Catholic. All that remains of his possessions is his telescope, which is on display at the Milltown community museum.

In his lifetime however he was well known and well respected, Robert Ball made reference to Birmingham's Observatory in one of his books and John, like William E. Wilson had numerous contacts at Dunsink Observatory.
