= Scoresby (crater) =

Crater on the Moon

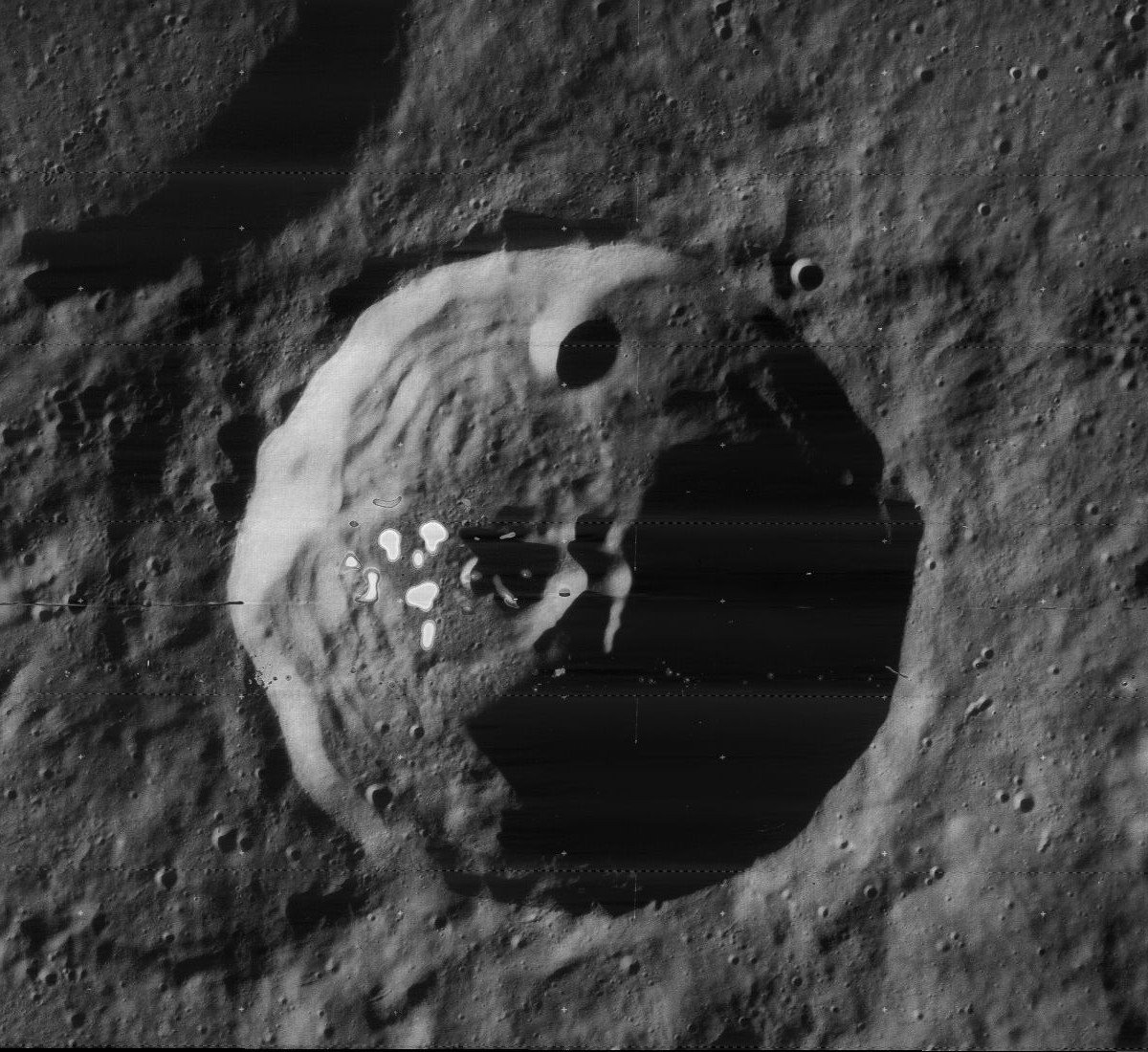
- Lunar Orbiter 4 image (Cluster of dots near center is blemish on original)
- Coordinates: 77.7°N 14.1°E
- Diameter: 56 km
- Depth: 4.50 km (2.80 mi)
- Colongitude: 350° at sunrise
- Eponym: William Scoresby

Scoresby is a lunar impact crater that is located in the northern part of the Moon's near side. It is nearly attached to the crater Challis along the north-northwestern rim, and is located just to the north of Meton, a walled plain. Due to its location, this crater appears highly foreshortened when viewed from the Earth, appearing elliptical in shape. It is, however, very nearly circular when seen from above.

This formation dates to the Eratosthenian epoch of the lunar geologic timescale. It has a sharp-edged outer wall that has not been significantly worn and is not marked by impacts. It has an outer rampart that extends outwards to nearly half a crater diameter, except where intersected by Challis in the north. The wide inner walls display an appearance of having been terraced, but these have been degraded by a multitude of lesser impacts over time.

Most of the inner floor of Scoresby is level and flat, except in the northeast where it is furrowed by some rough terrain. At the midpoint of the interior is a prominent central peak formation consisting of three mountainous ridges. There is a tiny craterlet just to the west of the central peaks, and a slightly larger craterlet along the northern interior wall.

== Satellite craters ==
By convention these features are identified on lunar maps by placing the letter on the side of the crater midpoint that is closest to Scoresby.

| Scoresby | Latitude | Longitude | Diameter |
|---|---|---|---|
| K | 76.3° N | 2.9° E | 23 km |
| M | 75.6° N | 8.1° E | 54 km |
| P | 75.8° N | 13.0° E | 26 km |
| Q | 77.4° N | 8.7° E | 40 km |
| W | 74.5° N | 11.2° E | 10 km |
