= Goldschmidt (crater) =

Lunar impact crater

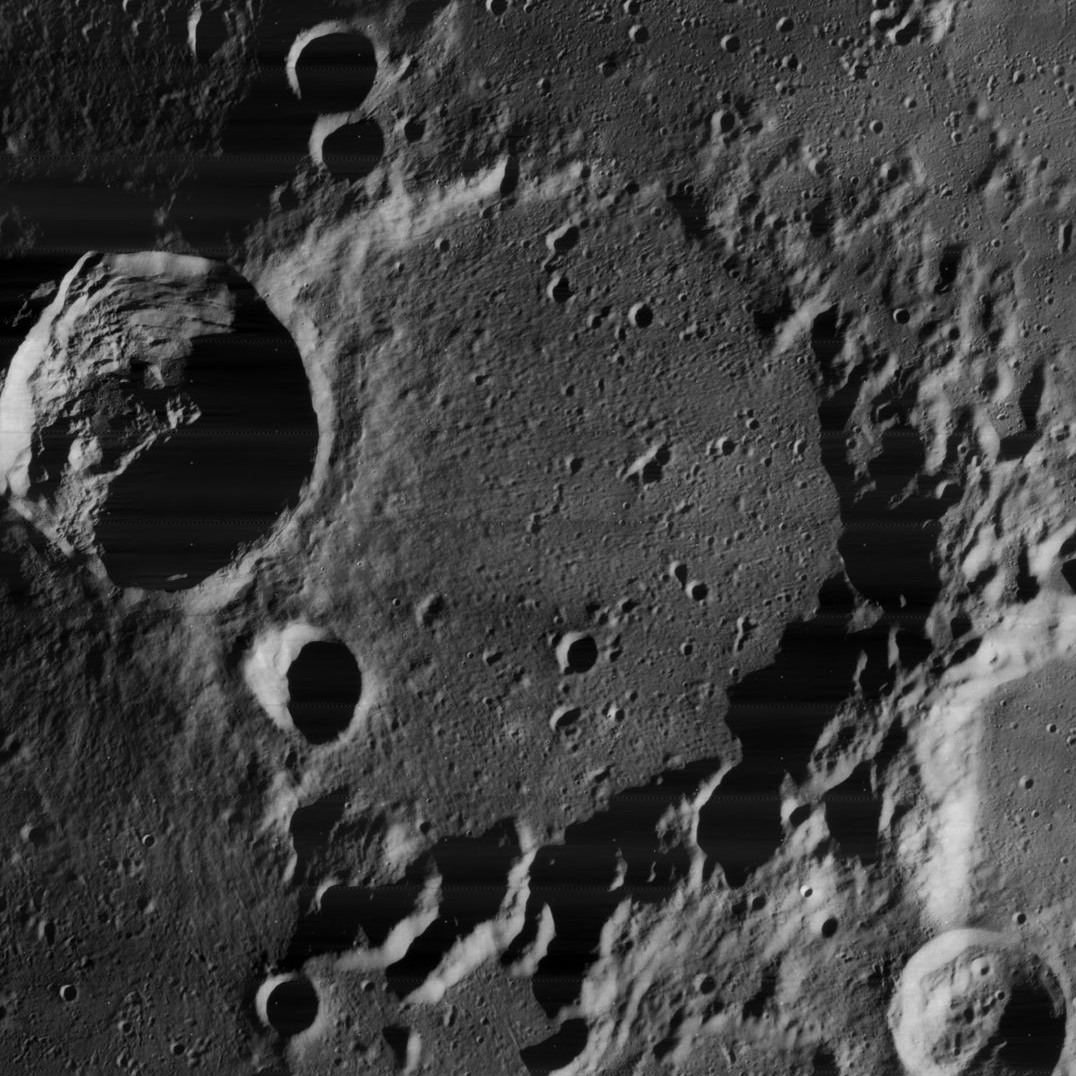
- Lunar Orbiter 4 image of Goldschmidt, also showing Anaxagoras at left
- Coordinates: 73.0°N 3.8°W
- Diameter: 113 km
- Depth: 2.0 km
- Colongitude: 3° at sunrise
- Formation: Pre-Nectarian
- Eponym: Hermann Goldschmidt

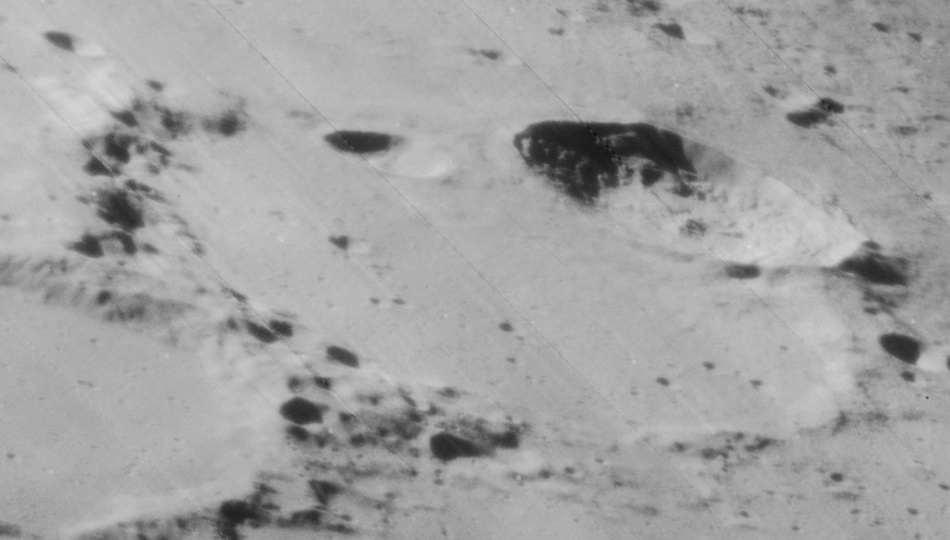
Oblique view from Lunar Orbiter 4

Goldschmidt is a large lunar impact crater of the variety commonly termed a walled plain. It lies in the northern part of the Moon's near side, and appears oval in shape due to foreshortening. The rim is actually relatively circular, although the western rim is overlain by the prominent crater Anaxagoras. Nearly attached to the southeast rim is Barrow, and the two formations are separated by a rugged rise about 30 kilometers across. Further to the south is Epigenes.

The heavily eroded outer rim of Goldschmidt is rugged and irregular, with an inner wall that is incised in several locations by small impacts. Much of the western rim no longer exists, due to the overlapping Anaxagoras and the smaller Anaxagoras A, and the ejecta from these formations covers the western third of the interior floor. The remaining floor is nearly level and flat, most likely having been resurfaced by lava flows. However the surface is now pock-marked by a multitude of tiny craterlets, the most prominent being the small Goldschmidt A. Linear troughs in the southern rim are associated with ejecta from the formation of the Imbrium basin.

== Satellite craters ==
By convention these features are identified on lunar maps by placing the letter on the side of the crater midpoint that is closest to Goldschmidt.

Goldschmidt	Latitude	Longitude	Diameter
A	72.5° N	2.5° W	7 km
B	70.6° N	6.7° W	10 km
C	71.1° N	6.0° W	7 km
D	75.3° N	7.7° W	14 km
