= T Coronae Borealis =

Recurrent nova in the constellation Corona Borealis

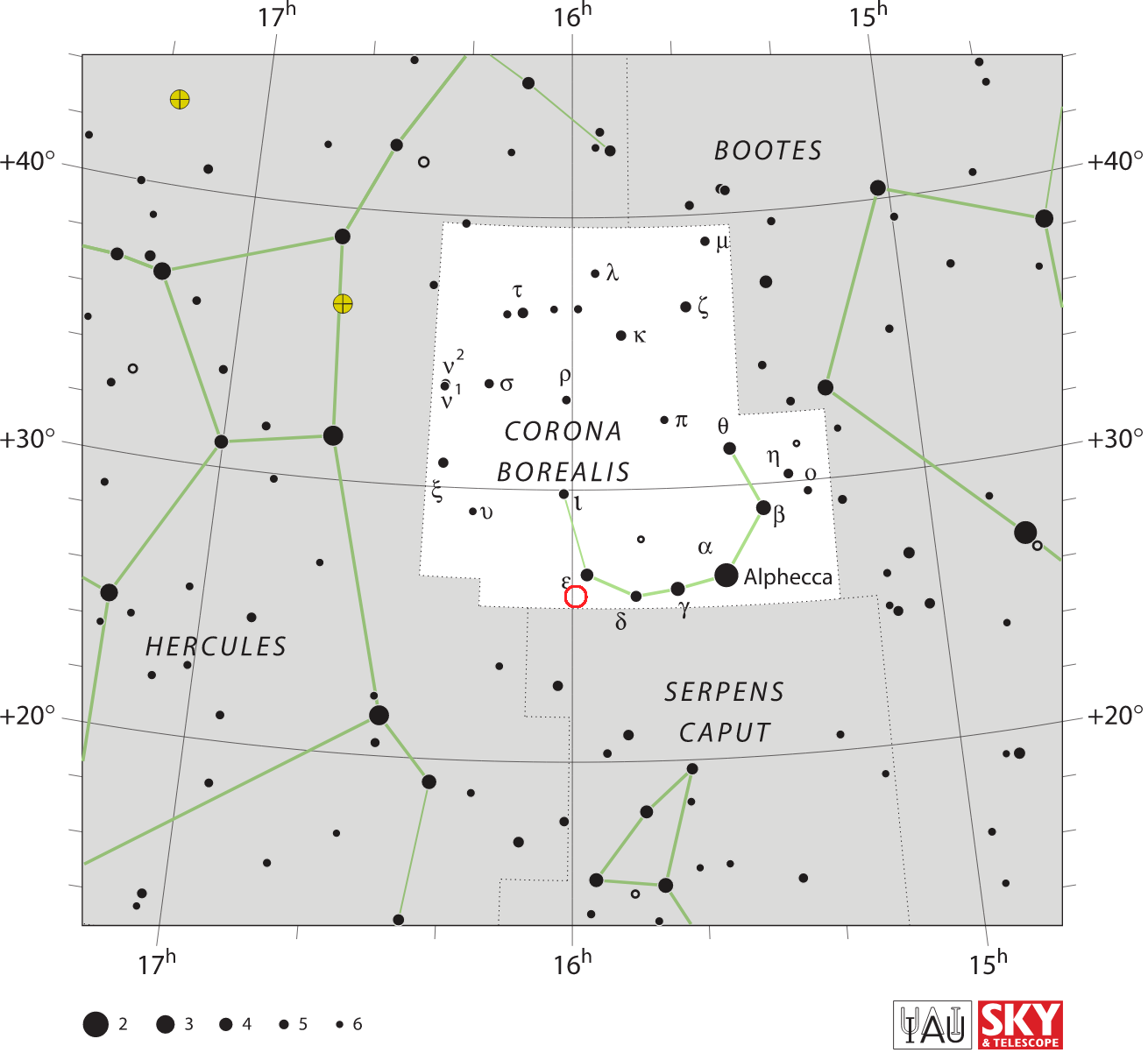
- Location of T Coronae Borealis (circled in red)

Observation data Epoch J2000 Equinox ICRS
- Constellation: Corona Borealis
- Right ascension: 15^{h} 59^{m} 30.1622^{s}
- Declination: +25° 55′ 12.613″
- Apparent magnitude (V): 2.0–10.8

Characteristics
- Evolutionary stage: Red giant + white dwarf
- Spectral type: M3III+p
- Variable type: recurrent nova

Astrometry
Radial velocity (R_{v})	−27.75±0.04 km/s
Proper motion (μ)	RA: −4.461 mas/yr Dec.: 12.016 mas/yr
Parallax (π)	1.0920±0.0275 mas
Distance	2,990 ± 80 ly (920 ± 20 pc)
Absolute magnitude (M_{V})	+0.16 (min.)

Orbit
Period (P)	227.5528±0.0002 days
Semi-major axis (a)	0.960 AU
Eccentricity (e)	0.009±0.003
Inclination (i)	61.5°
Periastron epoch (T)	2459978.37±0.08
Semi-amplitude (K_{1}) (primary)	23.90±0.05 km/s

Details

Red giant
Mass	0.93 M_{☉}
Radius	69±5 R_{☉}
Luminosity	583±4 L_{☉}
Surface gravity (log g)	0.672+0.009 −0.007 cgs
Temperature	3,561±3 K
Metallicity [Fe/H]	+0.20+0.05 −0.03 dex
Rotational velocity (v sin i)	4.75±0.26 km/s

White dwarf
Mass	1.35 M_{☉}
Radius	0.0045 R_{☉}
Luminosity	~100 L_{☉}

Other designations
- Blaze Star, T CrB, AAVSO 1555+26, BD+26°2765, HD 143454, HIP 78322, HR 5958, SAO 84129, 2MASS J15593015+2555126

Database references
SIMBAD	data

T Coronae Borealis is a binary star and a recurrent nova about 3,000 light-years (920 parsecs) away in the constellation Corona Borealis. Its apparent magnitude varies between 2.0 in outburst and 10.8 in quiescence, representing about a 3300-fold change in brightness. T Coronae Borealis is its variable-star designation and the name most frequently used in the astronomical literature, but it also has the official proper name Blaze Star. The system was first observed in outburst in 1866 by John Birmingham, but had been observed earlier in quiescence as an unremarkable 10th magnitude star. It may have been observed in 1217 and in 1787 as well. Its February 1946 flare-up was discovered independently by three observers: the Soviet amateur astronomer A. S. Kamenchuk, the 15-year-old schoolboy Michael Woodman from Wales, and the British variable star observer N. F. H. Knight. This led to the guess that the star flares every 80 years with the next nova outburst then predicted to occur before 2027. T Coronae Borealis enters solar conjunction in late November and becomes hidden by the Sun's glare for a few months.

== Nomenclature ==
T Coronae Borealis (abbreviated T CrB or unofficially T Cor Bor) is the star's variable star designation and is its most commonly used name. It also has the Bright Star Catalogue designation HR 5958 and the Henry Draper Catalogue designation HD 143454.

The proper name Blaze Star has been used since its outburst in 1866, and was officially approved by the IAU Working Group on Star Names on 22 September 2025.

== Description ==
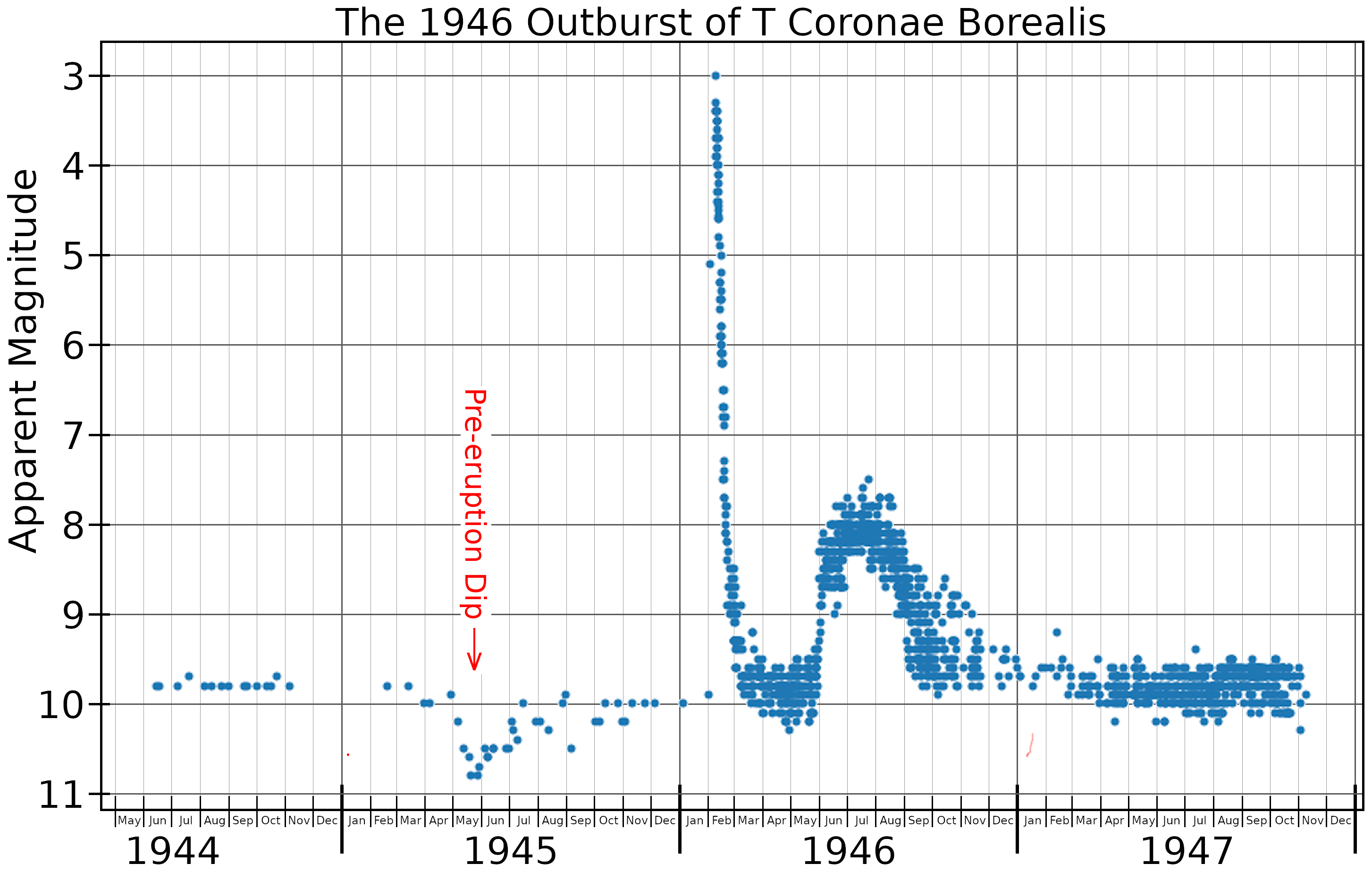
The light curve of T Coronae Borealis during the time surrounding its 1946 eruption, plotted from AAVSO data

T CrB normally has a magnitude of about 10, which is near the limit of typical binoculars. Two well-documented outbursts have been observed, reaching magnitude 2.0 on May 12, 1866 and magnitude 3.0 on February 9, 1946, though a more recent paper shows the 1866 outburst with a possible peak range of magnitude 2.5±0.5. When at peak magnitude of 2.5, this recurrent nova is dimmer than about 100 brightest stars in the night sky, but easily visible to the naked eye.

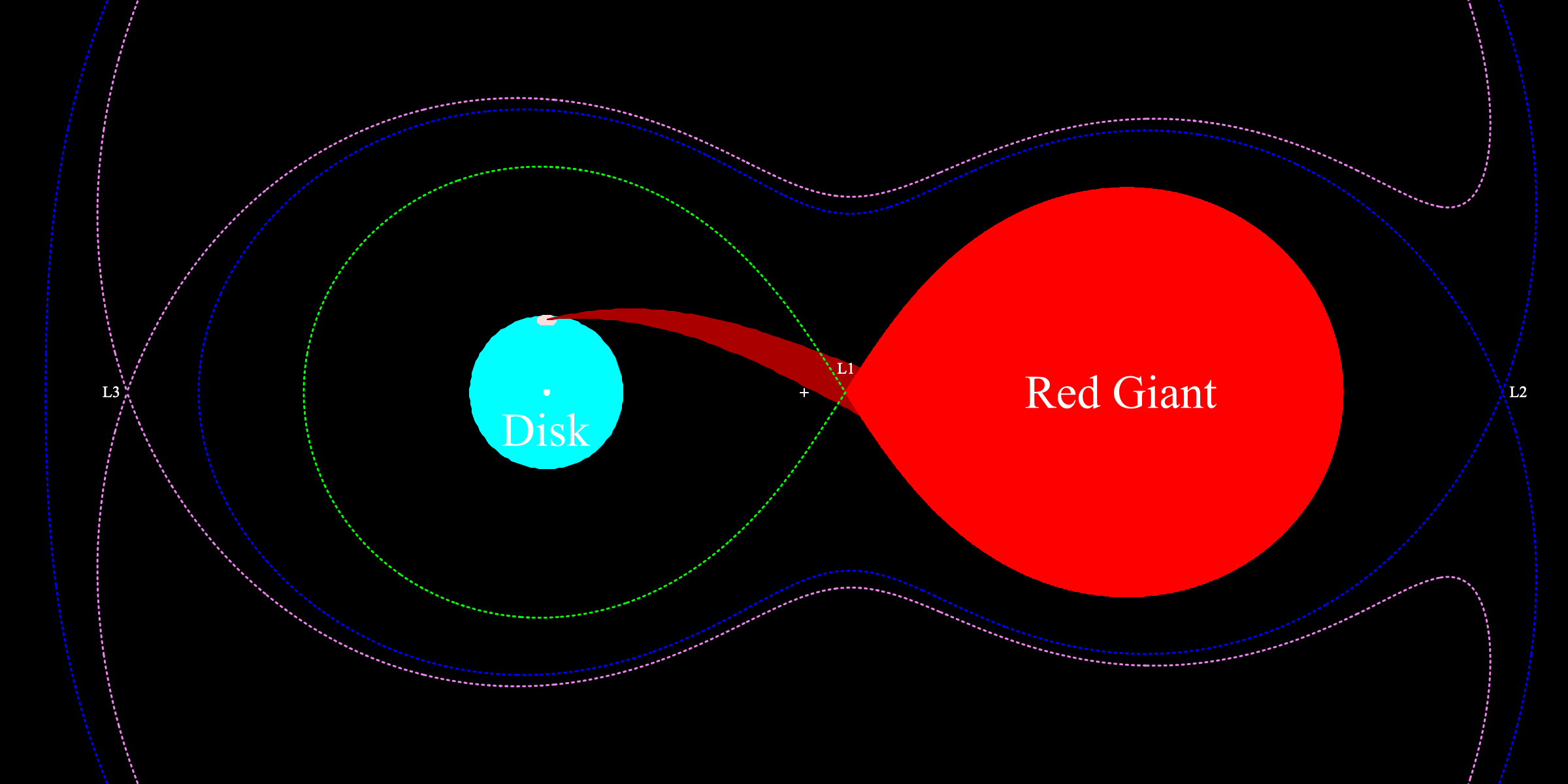
Diagram of T Coronae Borealis based on a description given by Kraft using the updated mass ratio given by Stanishev

Like all novae, T CrB is a binary system containing a large cool component and a smaller hot component. The cool component is a red giant that transfers material to the hot component. The hot component, which initially was the most massive and brightest of the two stars, is now a white dwarf surrounded by an accretion disc, all hidden inside a dense cloud of material from the red giant. When the system is quiescent, the red giant dominates the visible light output and the system appears as an M3 giant. The hot component contributes some emission and dominates the ultraviolet output. During outbursts, the transfer of material to the hot component increases greatly, the hot component expands, and the overall luminosity of the system increases by orders of magnitude.

T Coronae Borealis imaged on 23 June 2026 with a Unistellar 114mm smart telescope (north is towards top right, field of view about 0.5°)

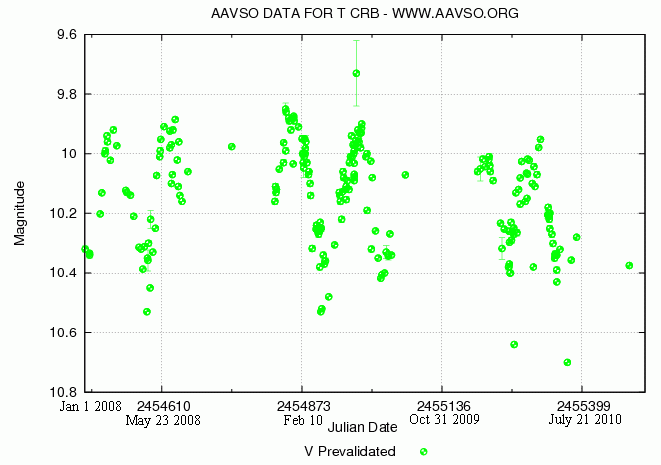
AAVSO light curve of recurrent nova T CrB from Jan 1, 2008 to Nov 17, 2010, showing rotating ellipsoidal variability. Up is brighter and down is fainter. Day numbers are Julian day.

The two components of the system orbit each other every 227.5528 d. The orbit is almost circular and is inclined at an angle of 61.5°. The separation between the components is 0.960 AU.

== 2016–present activity ==
On April 20, 2016, Sky & Telescope reported a sustained brightening since February 2015 from magnitude 10.5 to about 9.2. A similar event was reported in 1938, eight years before the 1946 outburst. By June 2018, the star had dimmed slightly but still remained at an unusually high level of activity. By mid-2023, it had faded by 0.35 magnitude or about 28%; (Note: $1 - 100 ^{-0.35/5} = 0.2756$) its lowest brightness seen since 2016. A similar dimming occurred in the year before the 1946 outburst, leading some to predict an eruption before September 2024. The eruption has repeatedly been predicted to be imminent, but no nova has been observed as of November 2026 and several of the predictions have already lapsed.

After the 2023–2024 fading event, T CrB brightened around May 2024, but again by July 2026 its light curve showed renewed decline. Hence, some researchers opine that if the decline continues, then this may actually be a truer analogue to the similar pre-1946 dip, instead of the 2023–2024 dip event considered in earlier predictions and hence, an eruption around December 2026 may still be possible.

=== Outburst predictions ===
Predictions of the next nova eruption (in order of when the prediction was made):

- 2026–2027 (made in 1946 either by N. F. H. Knight or W. M. Lindley)
- Mid‐February 2024 to end‐September 2026 (made in March 2023) (lapsed)
- Beginning January 2024 to mid-August 2024 (made in June 2023) (lapsed)
- January 2024 (made in August 2023) (lapsed)
- End of October 2024 (made in June 2024) (lapsed)
- Around March 27, 2025 (lapsed); November 10, 2025 (lapsed); June 25, 2026 (lapsed); or February 8, 2027 ± 8 days (made in October 2024)
- Around March 5, 2027, between February 2027 and May 2027, up to November 2027 (made in October 2026)
