= Challis (crater) =

Lunar impact crater

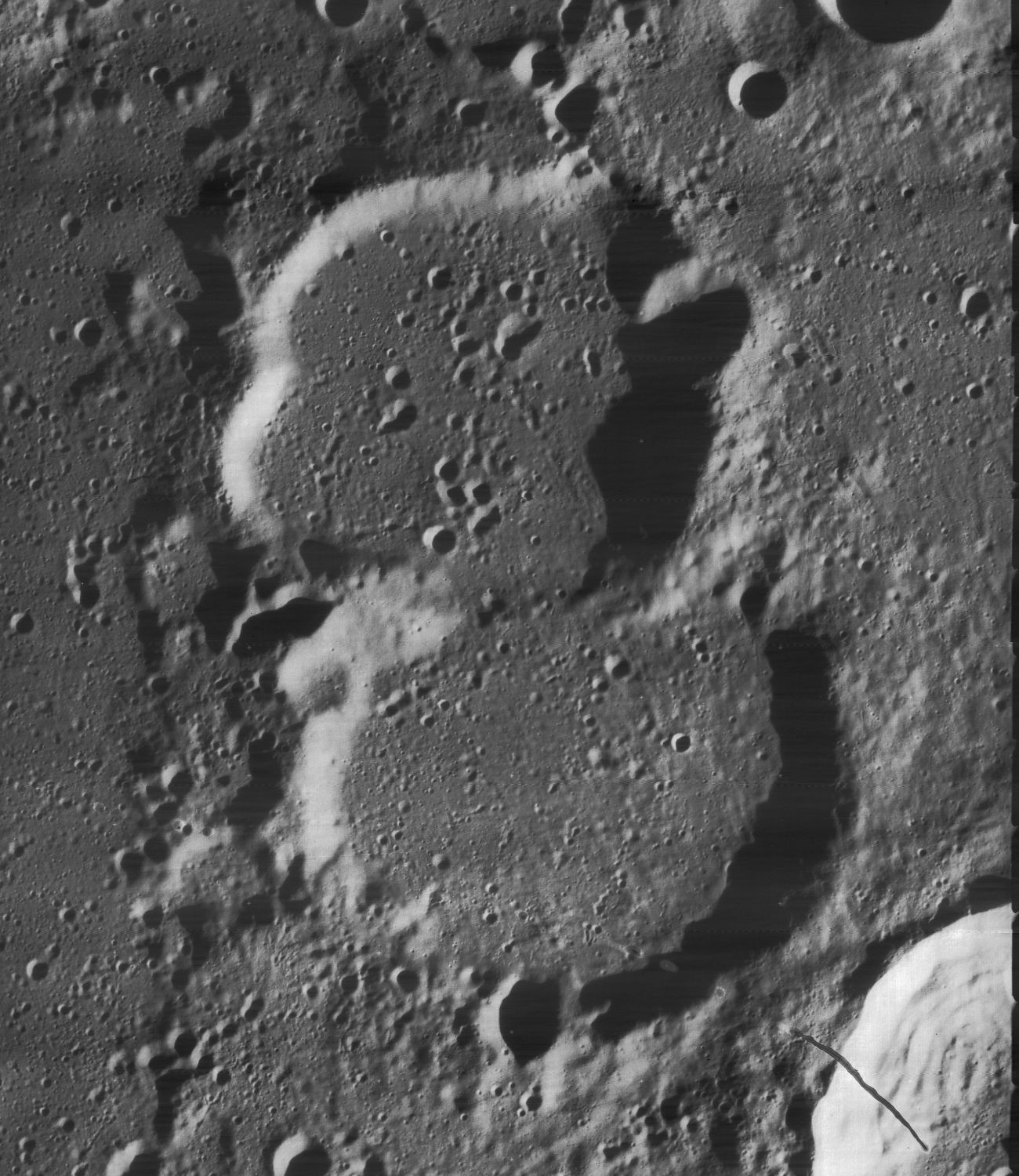
- Lunar Orbiter 4 image (Main above center, Challis below center)
- Coordinates: 79.5°N 9.2°E
- Diameter: 53.21 km (33.06 mi)
- Depth: 1.67 km (1.04 mi)
- Colongitude: 355° at sunrise
- Eponym: James Challis

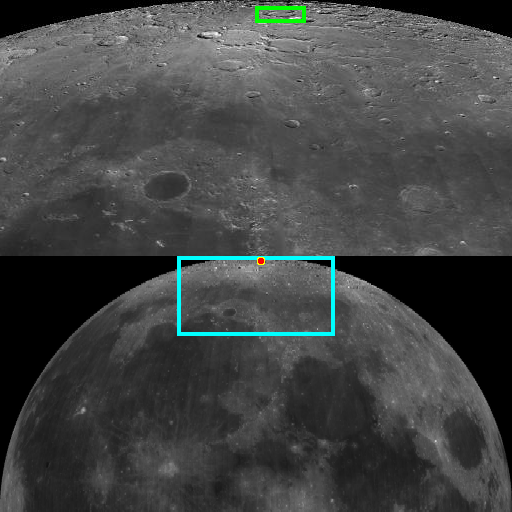
Location of the crater Challis

Challis is a lunar impact crater that is located in the northern regions of the Moon's near side, close enough to the limb to appear significantly foreshortened when viewed from the Earth. It is joined to the crater Main through a break in the northern rim, and is close to Scoresby along the southeast side.

The rim of this crater has been damaged and eroded by a history of impacts, with the most intact portion located along the southeastern half. A small crater lies across the southern rim, and the remaining rim is notched and irregular. The interior floor of both Challis and Main have been resurfaced forming a relatively level bottom common to both formations. This surface is marked only by multiple tiny craterlets.

This formation is named after British astronomer, mathematician, and physicist James Challis (1803-1882). His name was incorporated into lunar nomenclature by William R. Birt and John Lee during the 19th century. Its designation was officially adopted by the International Astronomical Union in 1935.

== Satellite craters ==
By convention these features are identified on lunar maps by placing the letter on the side of the crater midpoint that is closest to Challis.

| Challis | Latitude | Longitude | Diameter |
|---|---|---|---|
| A | 77.2° N | 2.3° E | 32 km |
