= Main (lunar crater) =

Crater on the Moon

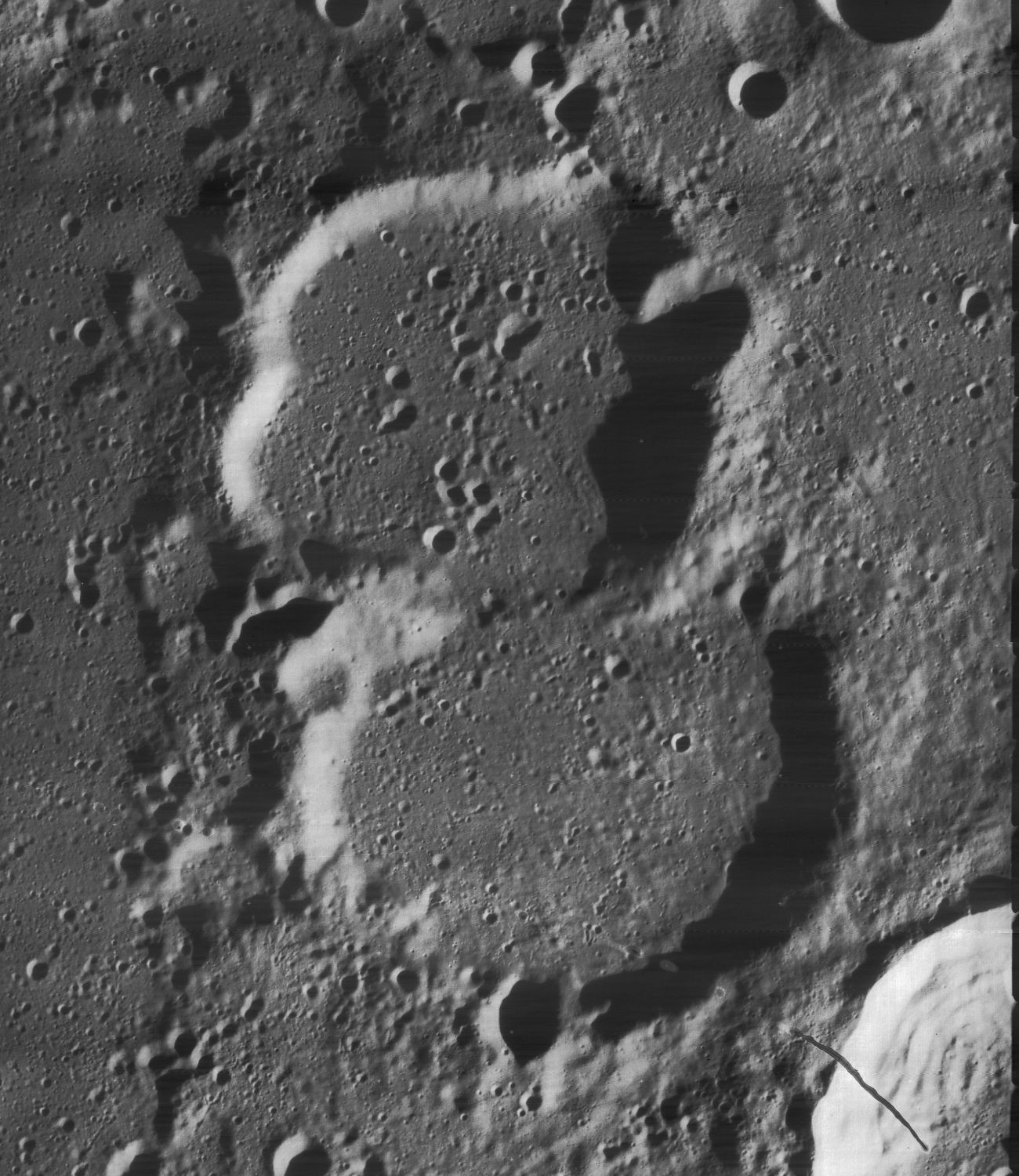
- Lunar Orbiter 4 image (Main above center, Challis below center)
- Coordinates: 80.8°N 10.1°E
- Diameter: 46 km
- Depth: 2.8 km
- Colongitude: 354° at sunrise
- Eponym: Robert Main

Main is a lunar impact crater that is located near the north pole of the Moon. The southern rim of this formation has merged with the larger crater Challis to the south, and the level interior floor connects the two craters through a narrower gap. To the north-northwest of Main is Gioja.

This formation consists of three overlapping craters that were joined together when the interior floor was resurfaced by lava flows, leaving a generally circular formation with outward bulges to the west and northeast. The same lava has joined the floor of Main with Challis to the south.

The surviving rim of Main is a low slope that is nearly level with the surrounding terrain at its top. There is a small crater lying across the eastern rim that is roughly bowl-shaped and missing its western rim. The floor of Main is nearly level, and marked by a number of tiny craterlets that lie nearly in a band across the floor from the southwest towards the northeast. There is no central peak within the crater, and no other hills of note.

== Satellite craters ==
By convention these features are identified on lunar maps by placing the letter on the side of the crater midpoint that is closest to Main.

Main	Latitude	Longitude	Diameter
L	81.7° N	23.2° E	14 km
N	82.3° N	22.0° E	11 km
