= 1280 Baillauda =

Main-belt asteroid

Discovery
- Discovered by: E. Delporte
- Discovery site: Uccle Obs.
- Discovery date: 18 August 1933

Designations
- Named after: Jules Baillaud (French astronomer)
- Alternative designations: 1933 QB · 1931 HE; 1946 SF · 1959 UK; 1961 AN · A912 GB
- Minor planet category: main-belt · (outer) background

Orbital characteristics
- Epoch 4 September 2017 (JD 2458000.5)
- Uncertainty parameter 0
- Observation arc: 84.12 yr (30,725 days)
- Aphelion: 3.5842 AU
- Perihelion: 3.2431 AU
- Semi-major axis: 3.4136 AU
- Eccentricity: 0.0500
- Orbital period (sidereal): 6.31 yr (2,304 days)
- Mean anomaly: 61.729°
- Mean motion: 0° 9^{m} 22.68^{s} / day
- Inclination: 6.4598°
- Longitude of ascending node: 293.06°
- Argument of perihelion: 98.986°

Physical characteristics
- Dimensions: 50.83±2.0 km 53.97±0.72 km
- Synodic rotation period: 12.6 h
- Geometric albedo: 0.045±0.001; 0.0505±0.004
- Spectral type: Tholen = X P (derived from Tholen); B–V = 0.671; U–B = 0.360
- Absolute magnitude (H): 9.99±0.22 · 10.33

1280 Baillauda, provisional designation 1933 QB, is a dark background asteroid from the outermost region of the asteroid belt, approximately 52 kilometers in diameter. Discovered by Eugène Delporte at Uccle Observatory in 1933, the asteroid was named after French astronomer Jules Baillaud.

== Discovery ==
Baillauda was discovered by Belgian astronomer Eugène Delporte at the Royal Observatory of Belgium in Uccle on 18 August 1933. On the following night, it was independently discovered by Soviet astronomer Grigory Neujmin at Simeiz Observatory on the Crimean peninsula. The Minor Planet Center only recognizes the first discoverer.

The asteroid was first identified as A912 GB at Heidelberg Observatory in April 1912. The body's observation arc begins with its official discovery observation at Uccle in August 1933.

== Orbit and classification ==
Baillauda is a non-family asteroid from the main belt's background population. It orbits the Sun in the outer asteroid belt at a distance of 3.2–3.6 AU once every 6 years and 4 months (2,304 days; semi-major axis of 3.41). Its orbit has an eccentricity of 0.05 and an inclination of 6° with respect to the ecliptic.

== Physical characteristics ==
In the Tholen classification, Baillauda is an X-type asteroid. The Lightcurve Data Base amends this Tholen spectral type and derives a primitive P-type based on the asteroid's low albedo (see below).

=== Rotation period ===
In August 1990, a rotational lightcurve of Baillauda was obtained from photometric observations by Swedish astronomer Claes-Ingvar Lagerkvist in a collaboration with other European astronomers. The observations were taken with the 1.5-meter telescope at the Loiano Observatory in Italy (598). Lightcurve analysis gave a rotation period of 12.6 hours with a brightness amplitude of 0.25 magnitude (U=2).

=== Diameter and albedo ===
According to the surveys carried out by the Infrared Astronomical Satellite IRAS and the Japanese Akari satellite, Baillauda measures 50.83 and 53.97 kilometers in diameter and its surface has an albedo of 0.0505 and 0.045, respectively. The Collaborative Asteroid Lightcurve Link adopts the results obtained by IRAS, that is an albedo of 0.0505 and a diameter of 50.83 kilometers based on an absolute magnitude of 10.33.

== Naming ==
This minor planet was named after French astronomer Jules Baillaud (1876–1960), who led the Pic du Midi Observatory in the French Pyrenees (1937–1947), after his stay at the observatories at Paris and Lyons (513). Jules was the son of prolific astronomer Benjamin Baillaud (1848–1934), after whom the lunar crater Baillaud was named.

The official naming citation was mentioned in The Names of the Minor Planets by Paul Herget in 1955 (H 117).
