= Epigenes (crater) =

Crater on the Moon

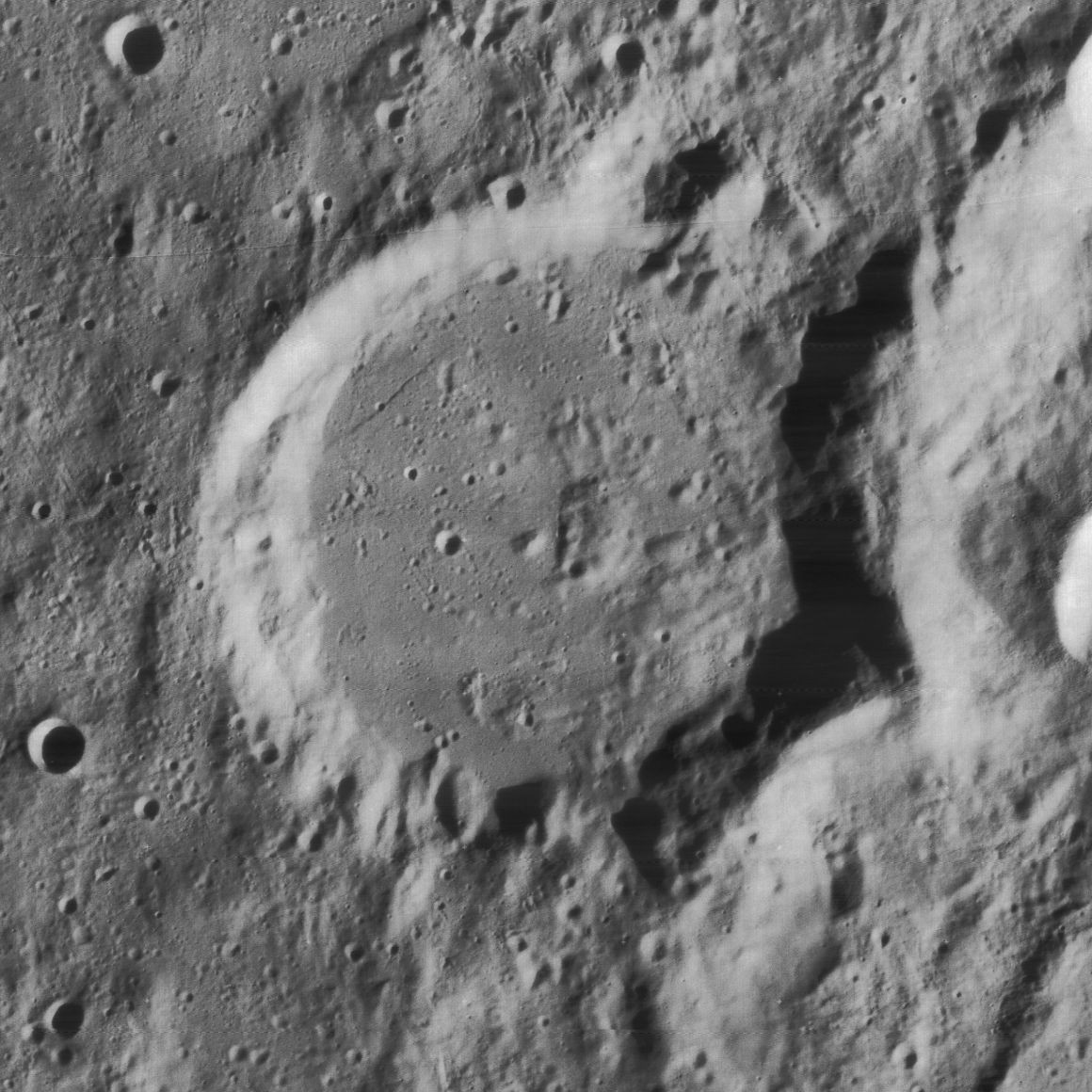
- Lunar Orbiter 4 image
- Coordinates: 67.5°N 4.6°W
- Diameter: 54.51 km (33.87 mi)
- Depth: 2.40 km (1.49 mi)
- Colongitude: 7° at sunrise
- Formation: Nectarian
- Eponym: Epigenes of Byzantium

Epigenes is a lunar impact crater that is located in the north part of the Moon, and is sufficiently close to the northern limb to appear significantly foreshortened from the Earth. It lies just to the northwest of the remains of the walled plain W. Bond. Due north of Epigenes is Goldschmidt, and the ruined crater Birmingham lies just to the southwest.

On the lunar geologic timescale, Epigenes is a crater of Nectarian age. This formation is a picture in contrasts. The north and northwest parts of the rim are well-formed with little appearance of wear, while the remainder of the rim is notably eroded, particularly in the east-southeastern half. The western half of the interior floor is smooth and nearly featureless, while the remainder is somewhat hummocky and appears covered in ejecta from the east. The small crater Epigenes B intrudes into the northeastern rim.

This formation is named after Greek astronomer Epigenes of Byzantium (unknown–c. 200 B.C.). His name was included with the lunar nomenclature of Italian astronomer Giovanni Battista Riccioli in 1651. Its designation was formally adopted by the International Astronomical Union in 1935.

== Epigenes during full moon ==
Although almost nothing of Epigenes is recognizable during full moon, the nearby and slightly eastward of Epigenes located bright satellite crater Epigenes A is a handy guide to get to the location of Epigenes itself. The brightness of Epigenes A is also noticeable on the photographic version of chart LAC 3 (page 6) in The Clementine Atlas of the Moon (Ben Bussey / Paul D. Spudis).

== Satellite craters ==
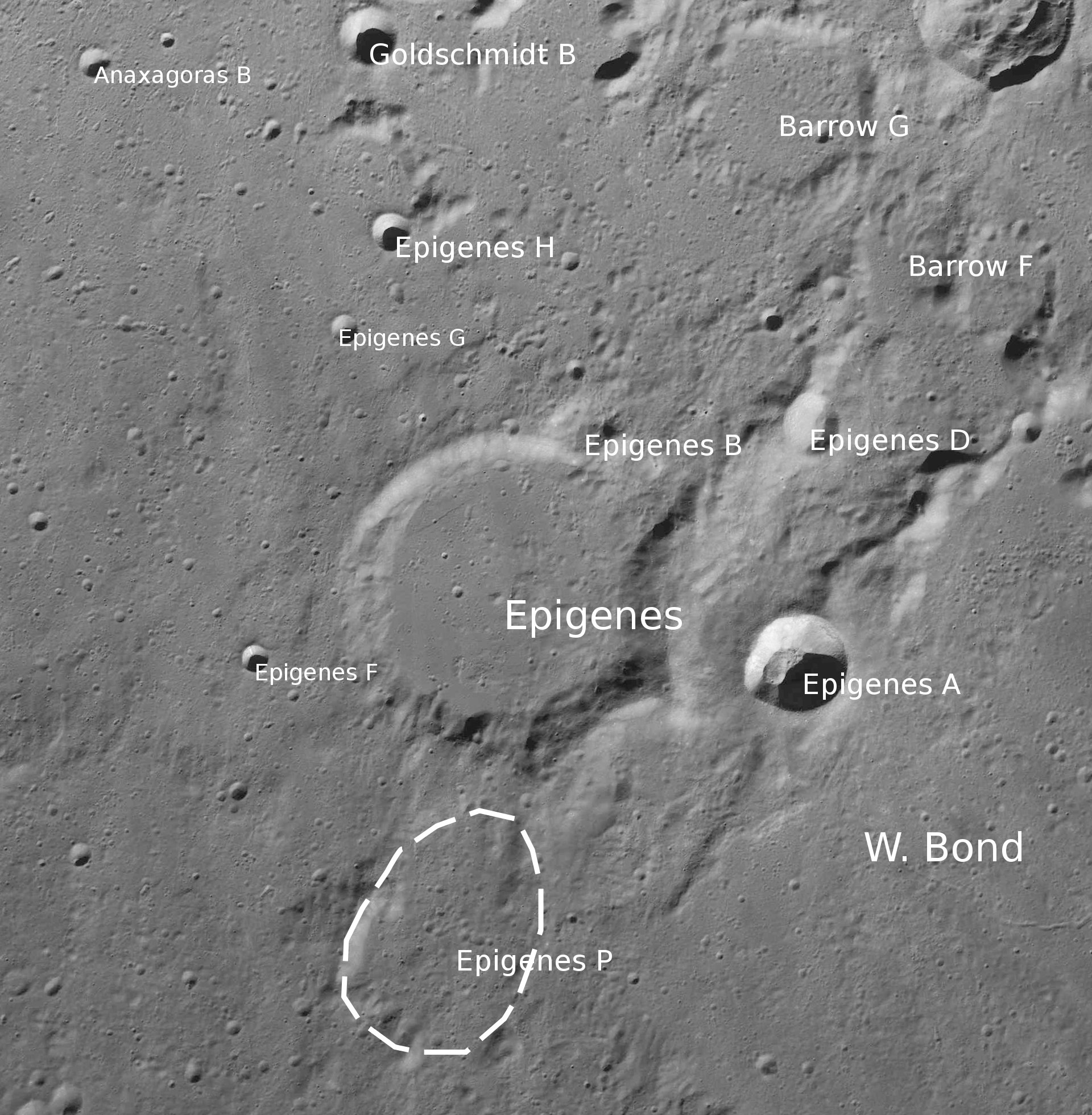
Satellite features of Epigenes

By convention these features are identified on lunar maps by placing the letter on the side of the crater midpoint that is closest to Epigenes.

Epigenes	Latitude	Longitude	Diameter
A	66.9° N	0.3° W	18 km
B	68.3° N	3.1° W	11 km
D	68.3° N	0.3° E	10 km
F	67.1° N	8.1° W	5 km
G	68.9° N	7.0° W	5 km
H	69.4° N	6.4° W	7 km
P	65.4° N	5.4° W	33 km

The crater Epigenes A includes a variety of impact melt features.
