= Birmingham (crater) =

Crater on the Moon

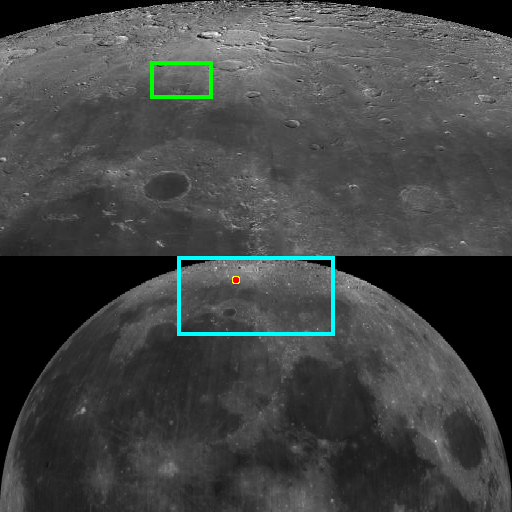
- Location of the lunar crater Birmingham.
- Coordinates: 65.1°N 10.5°W
- Diameter: 89.92 km (55.87 mi)
- Depth: 1.8 km (1.1 mi)
- Colongitude: 13° at sunrise
- Eponym: John Birmingham

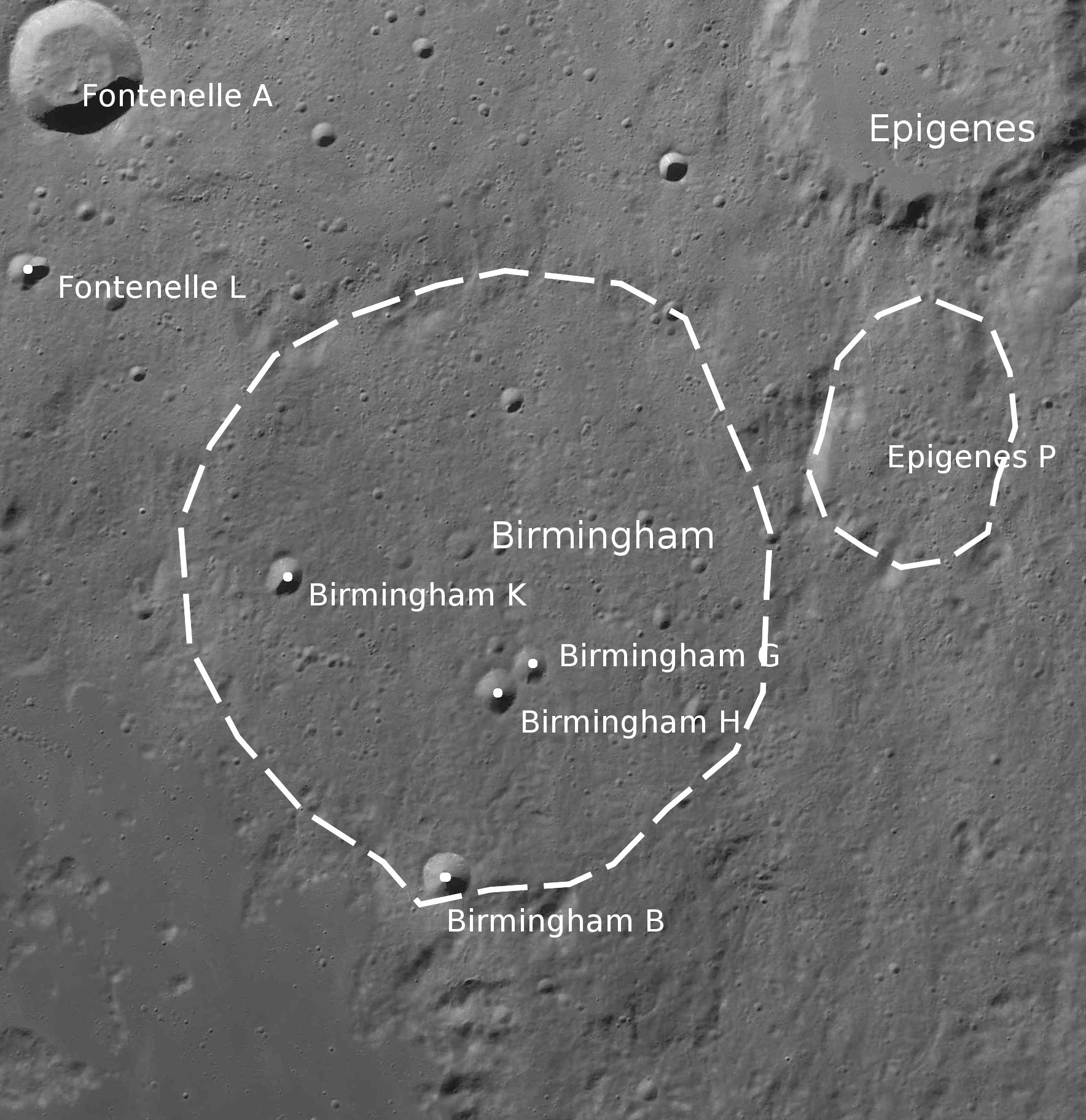
Map of Birmingham and vicinity

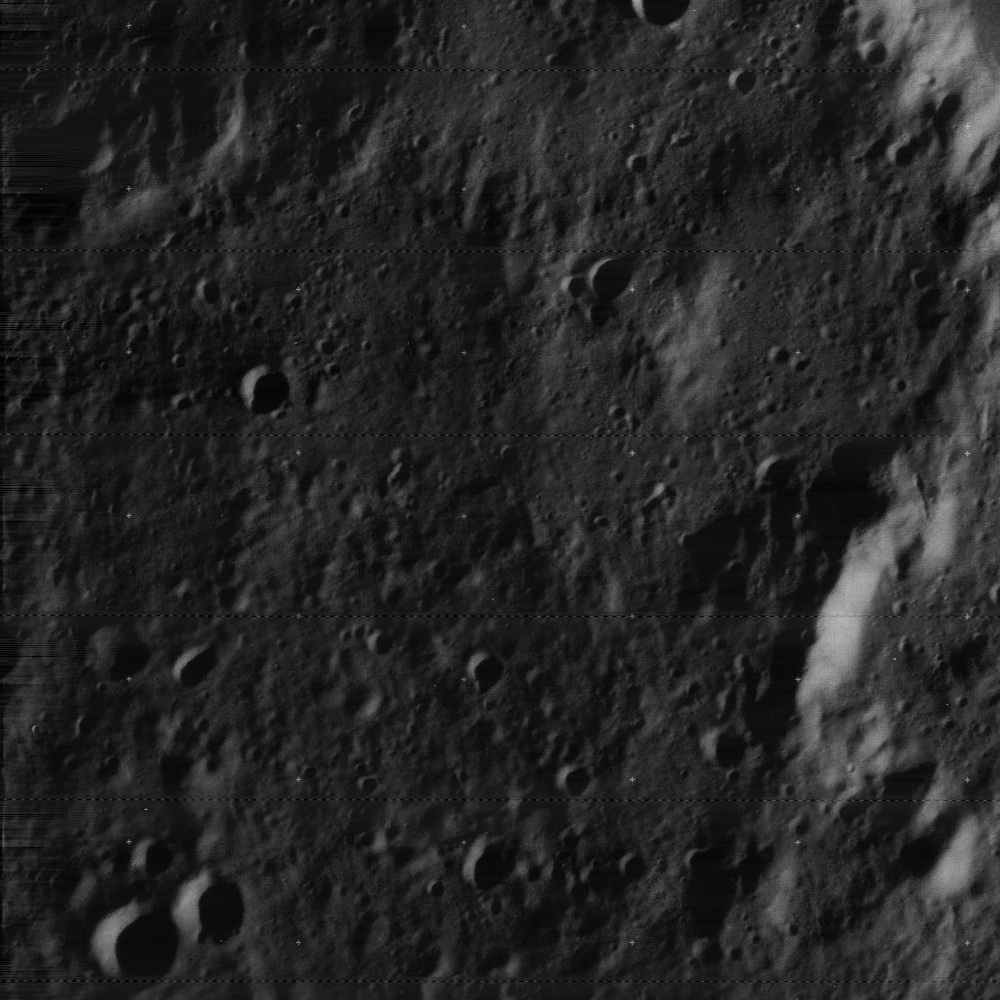
Lunar Orbiter 4 image of most of Birmingham, including the northern crater rim, at a low sun angle

Birmingham is the surviving remnant of a lunar impact crater, forming a rhomboidal plain. It is located near the northern limb of the Moon, and so is viewed from the Earth at a low angle. The crater lies just to the north of the Mare Frigoris, and to the east of the walled plain named W. Bond, which is somewhat resembles. To the northeast is the smaller crater Epigenes, with Fontenelle to the west.

Because this formation is so heavily degraded, it can be difficult to identify except under low illumination conditions. All that survives of the original formation is an irregular perimeter of low, indented ridges surrounding the basalt-resurfaced interior. The inner floor is marked by several tiny craterlets, and the surface is unusually rough for a walled plain. A low angle of illumination allows fine details of this boulder-strewn field to be seen more clearly.

This crater is named after the Irish astronomer John Birmingham (1816–1884), not, as is often stated, the British city nor its Alabama namesake. Its name was incorporated into lunar nomenclature by William R. Birt and John Lee in the 19th century. This designation was officially adopted by the International Astronomical Union in 1935.

== Satellite craters ==
By convention these features are identified on lunar maps by placing the letter on the side of the crater midpoint that is closest to Birmingham.

Birmingham	Latitude	Longitude	Diameter
B	63.6° N	11.3° W	8 km
G	64.5° N	10.2° W	5 km
H	64.4° N	10.6° W	7 km
K	65.0° N	13.1° W	6 km
