= Anaxagoras of Aegina =

Ancient Greek sculptor

Anaxagoras (Ancient Greek: Ἀναξαγόρας) of Aegina was a sculptor who lived around 480 BCE, and created the statue of Zeus in bronze set up at Olympia by the states which had united in repelling the invasion of Xerxes I of Persia. He is supposed to be the same person as the sculptor mentioned in an epigram by Anacreon, but not the same as the writer on scene-painting mentioned by Vitruvius.
