= Baillaud (crater) =

Crater on the Moon

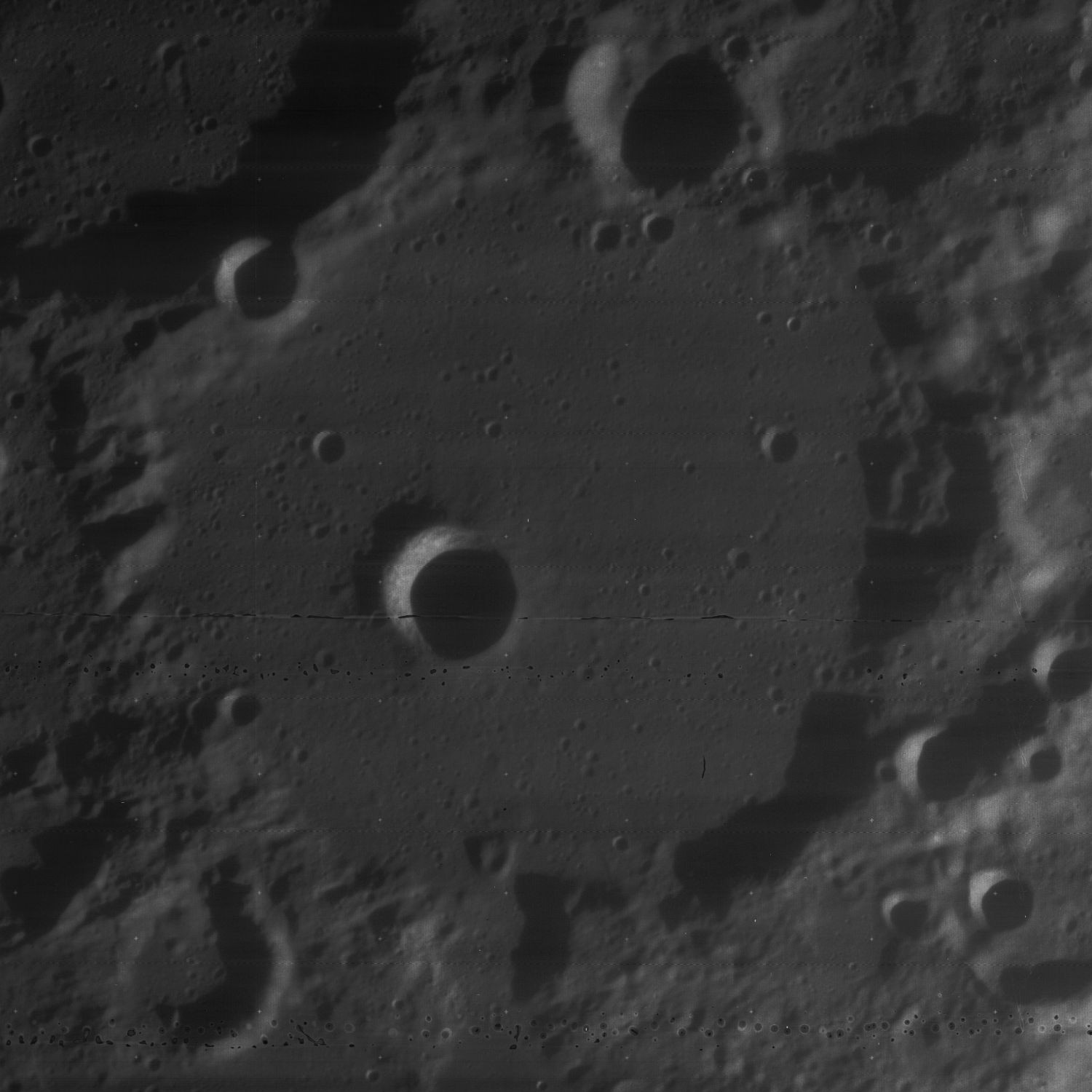
- Lunar Orbiter 4 image
- Coordinates: 74.6°N 37.5°E
- Diameter: 89.44 km (55.58 mi)
- Depth: 2.0 km (1.2 mi)
- Colongitude: 328° at sunrise
- Formation: Late Imbrian
- Eponym: Benjamin Baillaud

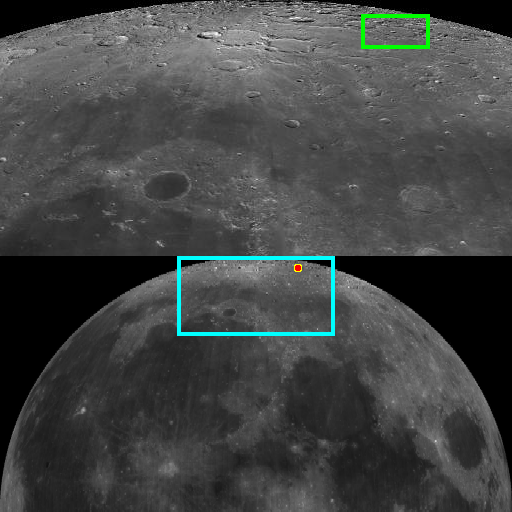
Location of Baillaud

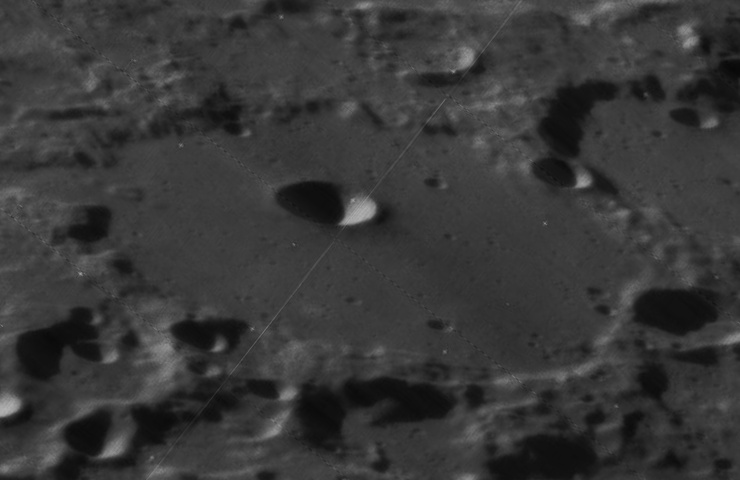
Oblique view of Baillaud from Lunar Orbiter 4

Baillaud is a lunar impact crater that is located near the north limb of the Moon. Nearby craters include the irregular Meton formation to the southwest, and Petermann further to the east. Due to its location, Baillaud appears oblong because of foreshortening along the line of sight to Earth.

On the lunar geologic timescale, this formation dates to the Late Imbrian period. The rim of the crater has been eroded and worn by a long history of impacts, leaving a hilly ridge surrounding the interior. The crater Euctemon is intruding into the rim to the northwest, and the rim bulges outward to the west. At the south end of the crater is a gap connecting to a mare basalt covered surface to the south.

The interior of Baillaud has been submerged by past mare basalt flows, leaving a flat, smooth surface that is marked only by many craterlets and the prominent satellite crater Baillaud E in the western half. The crater interior lacks a central peak or significant ridges.

This crater is named after the French astronomer Benjamin Baillaud (1848-1934). It was officially adopted by the International Astronomical Union in 1935. The name was introduced into lunar nomenclature by French astronomer Félix Chemla Lamèch.

== Satellite craters ==
By convention these features are identified on lunar maps by placing the letter on the side of the crater midpoint that is closest to Baillaud.

Baillaud	Latitude	Longitude	Diameter
A	75.7° N	48.8° E	56 km
B	73.0° N	33.3° E	17 km
C	75.0° N	51.4° E	11 km
D	73.6° N	49.7° E	16 km
E	74.3° N	36.0° E	14 km
F	75.7° N	53.7° E	20 km

== See also ==
- 11764 Benbaillaud, asteroid named after Benjamin Baillaud
- 1280 Baillauda, asteroid named after his son, Jules Baillaud
