= Benjamin Baillaud =

French astronomer (1848–1934)

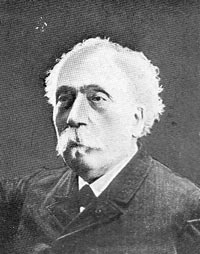
- Born: Édouard Benjamin Baillaud; 14 February 1848; Chalon-sur-Saône, Bourgogne-Franche-Comté, France
- Died: 8 July 1934 (aged 86)
- Education: École Normale Supérieure; University of Paris
- Occupation: Astronomer
- Awards: Bruce Medal (1923)
- Scientific career
- Thesis: Exposition de la méthode de M. Gylden pour le développement des perturbations des comètes (1876)

Édouard Benjamin Baillaud (French pronunciation: [edwaʁ bɛ̃ʒamɛ̃ bajo]; 14 February 1848 – 8 July 1934) was a French astronomer.

== Biography ==
Born in Chalon-sur-Saône, Baillaud studied at the École Normale Supérieure (1866-1869) and the University of Paris. He worked as an assistant at the Paris Observatory beginning in 1872. Later he was director of the Toulouse Observatory from 1878 to 1907, during much of this time serving as Dean of the University of Toulouse Faculty of Science.

He greatly expanded the observatory and enthusiastically supported the Carte du Ciel project. He specialized in celestial mechanics, in particular the motions of the satellites of Saturn.

In 1903, the observatory took over a facility on the Pic du Midi in the Pyrenees that had been founded by amateurs in the 1850s with the goal of putting a telescope there. However, the height of 2865 metres (9400 feet) posed formidable logistical challenges and the ambition had remained unrealised though a meteorological observatory had operated from 1873 to 1880. Baillaud organised a team of soldiers to erect a 0.5 metre (20 inch) reflecting telescope, and 0.25 metre refracting telescope on the summit.

In 1907, he became director of the Paris Observatory where he immediately set to work to relaunch the stalled Carte du Ciel project with a conference held at the observatory, entertained by singers from the Paris Opera and refreshed by wine provided by the director of the Bordeaux Observatory. Though the French government agreed to fund the project, it was becoming increasingly clear that its objectives were hopelessly unrealistic.

Baillaud was the President of the Société astronomique de France (SAF), the French astronomical society, from 1909 to 1911.

Baillaud was active in time standardisation, becoming the founding president of the International Time Bureau and initiating the transmission of a time signal from the Eiffel Tower. Baillaud maintained the observatory and the time signal throughout World War I, even though the German howitzer Big Bertha was targeted on the nominal co-ordinates of Paris, the location of the observatory! Baillaud's concern for the astronomical time standard led him to be an outspoken opponent of daylight saving time.

Baillaud became founding president of the International Astronomical Union in 1919 and served in this position until 1922. He retired as director of the Paris Observatory in 1926.

He was a regular academician in the astronomy section of the Académie des Sciences. He won the Bruce Medal in 1923.

The crater Baillaud on the Moon is named after him, as is the asteroid 11764 Benbaillaud. 1280 Baillauda is named after his son.

== Bibliography ==
- Distribution des prix du lycée de Saint-Quentin. Discours prononcé par M. B. Baillaud,... impr. de J. Vidallet, (1871) - 16 pages
- Thèses présentées à la Faculté des sciences de Paris pour obtenir le grade de docteur ès sciences mathématiques, par M. B. Baillaud,... Exposition de la méthode de M. Gylden pour le développement des perturbations des cometes... Éd. Gauthier-Villars, (1876) - 47 pages
- Theses de mathematiques, L. et J.-M. Douladoure (1876) - 108 Pages
- Sur la méthode de Hansen pour la détermination des perturbations absolues des petites planètes. 4 pages (1878)
- Sur une transformation trigonométrique employée par Hansen dans la théorie des perturbations, 7 pages (1878)
- Détermination des éléments des orbites des cinq satellites intérieurs de Saturne. Éd. Gauthier-Villars (1886)
- Sur le calcul numérique des intégrales définies. Éd.Gauthier-Villar (1886)
- Recherches complémentaires sur le développement de la fonction pertubatrice. (1888)
- Cours d'astronomie à l'usage des étudiants des facultés des sciences, Éd. Gauthier-Villars 1ère partie (1893), 2ème partie (1896)
- Discours: prononcé à la séance générale du Congrès, le 8.4.1899, Imprimerie nationale (1899) - 22 pages
- Congrès des sociétés savantes à Toulouse, Imprimerie nationale (1899) - 64 pages
- Mémoire sur les quadratures mécaniques de rangs quelconques. Éd. Gauthier-Villars, 38 pages (1899)
- Étude du climat de Toulouse de 1863 à 1900. (1902) - 444 pages
- Comparaison des catalogues méridiens de Toulouse et de Leipzig; Congres de Montauban (1902)
- Climat de Toulouse. Extrait des 'Comptes rendus de l'Association française pour l'avancement des sciences', congrès de Montauban, 1902. Hôtel des sociétés savantes (1902)
- Application du photometer à coin à la détermination des grandeurs photographiques des pléiades. Extrait des 'Comptes rendus de l'Association française pour l'avancement des sciences'. Congrès de Montauban, 1902
- Cartes autographiées, Université de Toulouse. Observatoire, F. Rossard, L. Montangerand, Benjamin Baillaud, Douladoure-Privat, (1904) - 3 pages. secrétariat de l'Association (1903)
- Correspondence d'Hermite et de Stieltjes, Éd. Gauthier-Villars, (1905) - Mathematiques
- 8 Novembre 1882 - 22 Juillet 1889, collaboration, Éd. Gauthier-Villars, (1905) - 477 pages
- 18 Octobre 1889 - 15 Décembre 1894, collaboration, Éd. Gauthier-Villars, (1905) - 464 pages
- Notice sur les travaux scientifiques de M. B. Baillaud, E. Privat, 1907
- Annales de l'Observatoire de Paris, collaboration, Éd. Gauthier-Villars, (1908)
- Revue scientifique (Revue rose) (1910), 617 pages
- L'Astronomie, par B. Baillaud. Larousse (1915) - 41 pages
- Un demi-siècle de civilisation française (1870–1915), Éd. Hachette et cie, (1916) - Voyage - 472 pages
- Rapport relatif aux signaux horaires émis de L'Observatoire de Paris. Imprimerie Gauthier-Villars - 132 pages (1918)
- De la méthode dans les sciences, Baillaud, Borel... Librairie Félix Alcan (1919)
- Rapport adressé au conseil dans sa séance du 3 mars 1921 sur la nécessité de la création d'une succursale de l'Observatoire en dehors de la ville. Impr. Nationale, 28 pages(1920)
- Inauguration du monument de l'amiral Mouchez, membre de l'Académie des sciences, au Havre, le dimanche 17 juillet 1921. Gauthier-Villars (1921) - 8 pages
- Henri Andoyer, 1862–1929. Journal des observateurs, (1929) - 6 pages
- Histoire de l'astronomie de position (1933)
- Application de la méthode de MM. P. et Pr. Henry à la réduction des clichés photographiques du catalogue international à l'Observatoire de Toulouse, Impr. de Douladoure-Privat, 21 pages

== See also ==
- Carlos Ibáñez e Ibáñez de Ibero – 1st president of the International Committee for Weights and Measures

== Obituaries ==
- AN 253 (1934) 15/16 (one sentence, in German)
- MNRAS 95 (1935) 334
- Obs 57 (1934) 308
- PASP 46 (1934) 242 (one paragraph)
