= De Vico (crater) =

Crater on the Moon

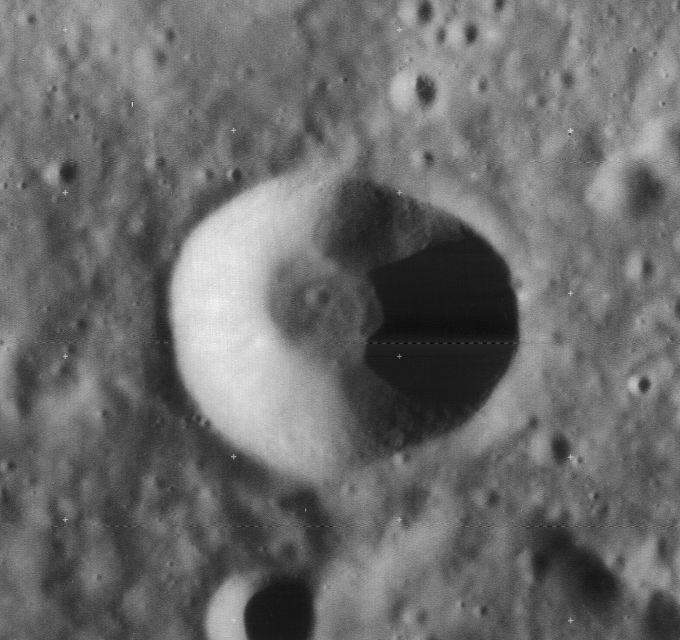
- Lunar Orbiter 4 image
- Coordinates: 19.7°S 60.2°W
- Diameter: 22.13 km (13.75 mi)
- Depth: Unknown
- Colongitude: 60° at sunrise

De Vico is a small lunar impact crater that is located in the southwest part of the Moon, to the south of the crater Sirsalis and east of Darwin. To the west-northwest is Crüger. De Vico is an oval, bowl-shaped formation with a small, flat bottom at the midpoint. This impact has exposed noritic anorthosite. To the northwest is the lava-flooded remains of De Vico T. Beyond is a linear rille designated Rimae Sirsalis that follows a path to the northeast past the rim of Sirsalis.

This formation is named after Italian astronomer Francesco de Vico (1805-1848). His name was included in the lunar nomenclature of Edmund Neison in 1876. Its designation was formally adopted by the International Astronomical Union in 1935.

== Satellite craters ==
By convention these features are identified on Lunar maps by placing the letter on the side of the crater midpoint that is closest to De Vico.

De Vico	Latitude	Longitude	Diameter
A	18.8° S	63.5° W	32 km
AA	18.8° S	63.1° W	12 km
B	17.8° S	58.7° W	9 km
C	20.6° S	62.3° W	12 km
D	21.1° S	61.9° W	12 km
E	21.1° S	61.3° W	13 km
F	19.1° S	62.6° W	12 km
G	19.0° S	58.9° W	8 km
H	19.9° S	59.1° W	8 km
K	20.1° S	58.3° W	8 km
L	19.9° S	57.7° W	5 km
M	21.1° S	59.4° W	8 km
N	19.8° S	61.9° W	6 km
P	20.4° S	60.8° W	30 km
R	19.4° S	61.9° W	13 km
S	19.5° S	63.4° W	10 km
T	18.7° S	61.8° W	41 km
X	20.5° S	60.1° W	6 km
Y	20.4° S	60.3° W	6 km
