= Rocca (crater) =

Crater on the Moon

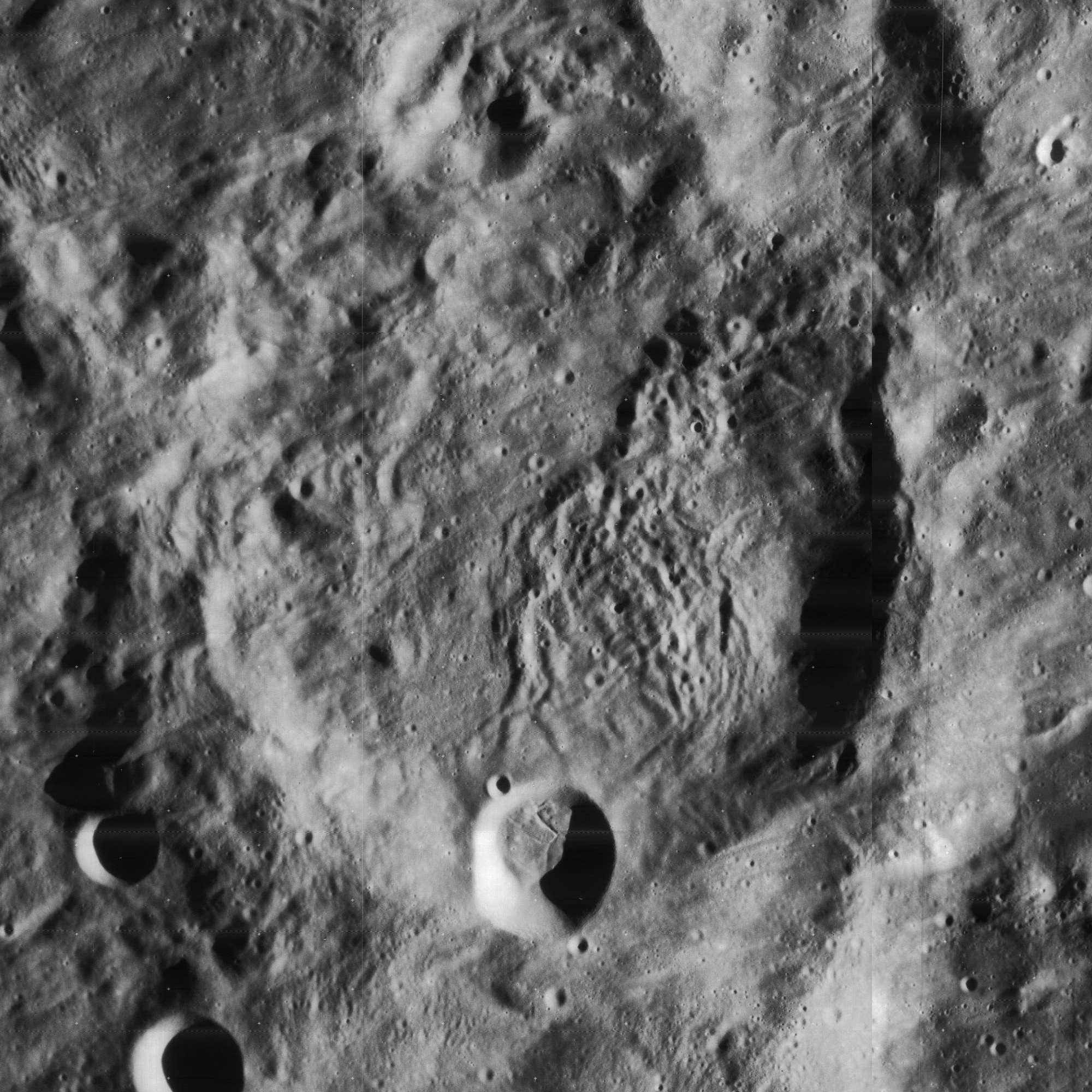
- Mosaic of Lunar Orbiter 4 images
- Coordinates: 12.7°S 72.8°W
- Diameter: 89 km
- Depth: Unknown
- Colongitude: 74° at sunrise
- Formation: Nectarian
- Eponym: Giovanni A. Rocca

Rocca is a lunar impact crater that is located near the western limb of the Moon. It lies to the northwest of the flooded crater Crüger, and to the west of the Montes Cordillera. Just to the east-southeast of Rocca is the small Lacus Aestatis, a small lunar mare.

This crater lies within the skirt of the ejecta that surrounds the Mare Orientale impact basin, and radial streaks of material have modified the surroundings of Rocca. There is a dune-like set of hills in the east part of the floor, similar to those in the eastern floor of the crater Darwin to the south, which is "decelerated surface-flow ejecta" from the Orientale impact. The rest of the crater is in poor condition with small craters along the rim. Rocca R cuts across the northern rim, while the smaller Rocca L lies along the southern edge and inner wall.

Rocca is a crater of Nectarian age.

== Satellite craters ==
By convention these features are identified on lunar maps by placing the letter on the side of the crater midpoint that is closest to Rocca.

Rocca	Latitude	Longitude	Diameter
A	13.8° S	70.0° W	63 km
B	12.6° S	67.4° W	25 km
C	10.7° S	70.2° W	19 km
D	11.0° S	68.0° W	24 km
E	11.8° S	69.4° W	43 km
F	13.6° S	66.6° W	27 km
G	13.3° S	64.9° W	23 km
H	12.9° S	65.4° W	26 km
J	14.9° S	73.9° W	13 km
L	13.9° S	72.6° W	17 km
M	14.5° S	70.7° W	42 km
N	11.6° S	70.3° W	24 km
P	11.2° S	71.7° W	32 km
Q	15.3° S	69.0° W	59 km
R	11.4° S	72.9° W	46 km
S	10.3° S	71.5° W	10 km
T	9.7° S	71.0° W	16 km
W	10.3° S	67.0° W	102 km
Z	16.0° S	75.4° W	55 km

Rocca T dates to the Imbrian period and has a meteoritic iron-rich impact melt.
