= January 2019 lunar eclipse =

Total lunar eclipse of 21 January 2019

- Total eclipse
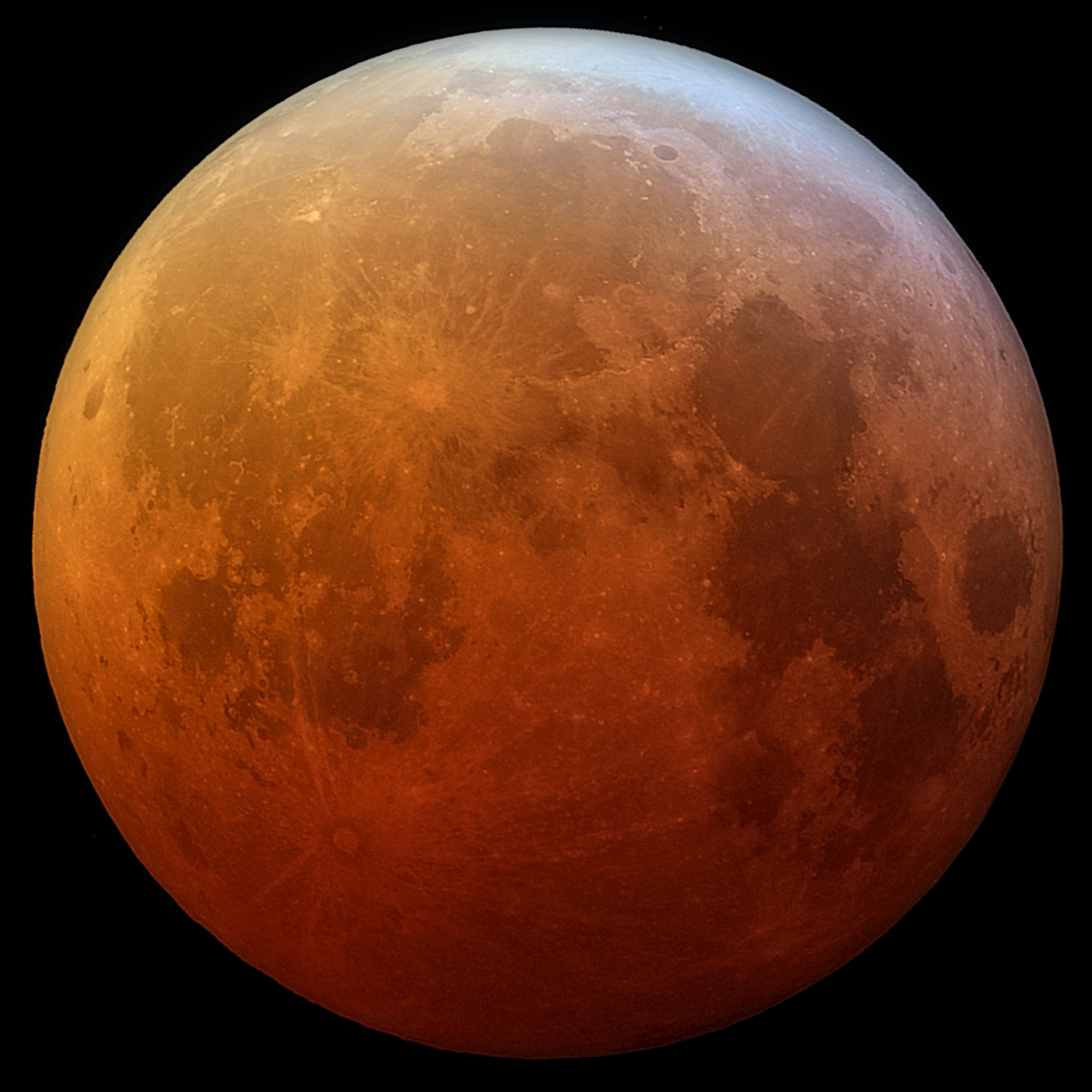
- Totality as viewed from Oria, Italy, 5:43 UTC
- Date: 21 January 2019
- Gamma: 0.3684
- Magnitude: 1.1966
- Saros cycle: 134 (27 of 73)
- Totality: 61 minutes, 59 seconds
- Partiality: 196 minutes, 45 seconds
- Penumbral: 311 minutes, 30 seconds
Contacts (UTC)
- P1: 2:36:30
- U1: 3:33:54
- U2: 4:41:17
- Greatest: 5:12:16
- U3: 5:43:16
- U4: 6:50:39
- P4: 7:48:00

A total lunar eclipse occurred at the Moon’s ascending node of orbit on Monday, 21 January 2019, with an umbral magnitude of 1.1966. A lunar eclipse occurs when the Moon moves into the Earth's shadow, causing the Moon to be darkened. A total lunar eclipse occurs when the Moon's near side entirely passes into the Earth's umbral shadow. Unlike a solar eclipse, which can only be viewed from a relatively small area of the world, a lunar eclipse may be viewed from anywhere on the night side of Earth. A total lunar eclipse can last up to nearly two hours, while a total solar eclipse lasts only a few minutes at any given place, because the Moon's shadow is smaller. Occurring about 10 hours before perigee (on 21 January 2019, at 15:00 UTC), the Moon's apparent diameter was larger.

Because the Moon was near its perigee on 21 January, it can be described as a "supermoon". As this supermoon was also a wolf moon (the first full moon in a calendar year), it was referred to as a "super blood wolf moon"; blood refers to the typical red color of the Moon during a total lunar eclipse. This was the last total lunar eclipse until May 2021. This was a Super Full Moon because occurred less than a day before perigee and the Moon was less than exactly 360,000 km (223,694 mi).

The Griffith Observatory in Los Angeles, California captured video showing a meteoroid impacting the Moon during the eclipse. The impact was observed during totality, at 4:41 UTC, on the left side of the Moon. It is the only documented case of a lunar impact during a total lunar eclipse.

== Appearance ==
This lunar eclipse took place in the constellation of Cancer, just west of the Beehive Cluster.

== Visibility ==
The eclipse was completely visible over North and South America and western Europe, seen rising over the central Pacific Ocean, and setting over Africa, most of Europe, and the Middle East.

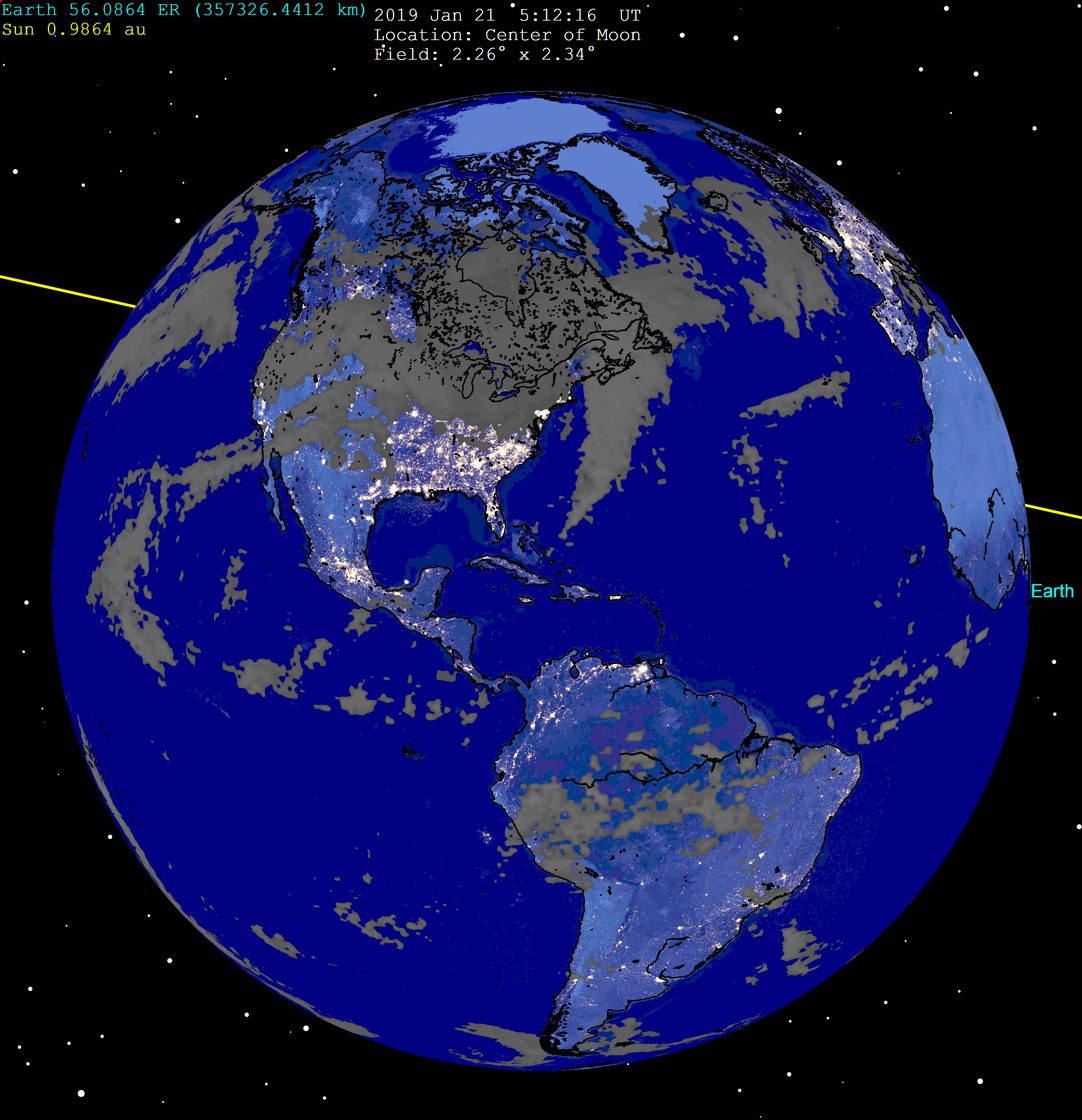
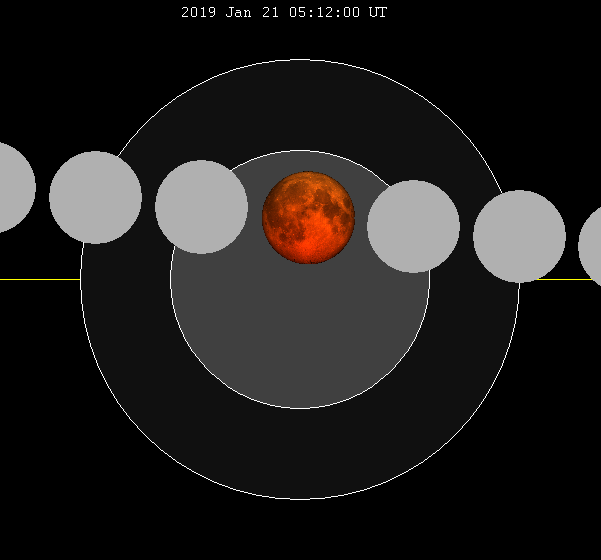
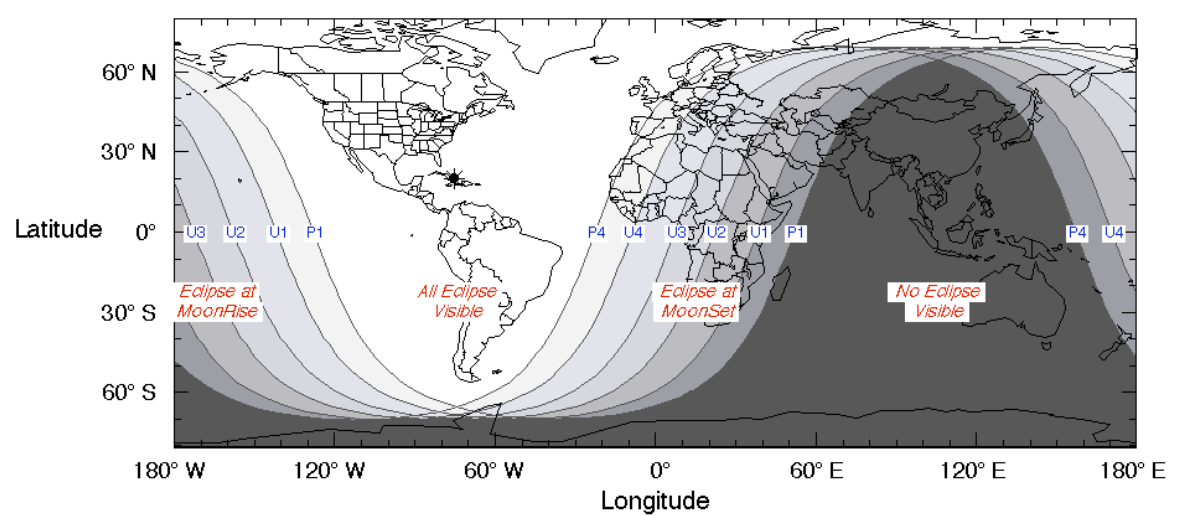
Visibility map

== Timing ==
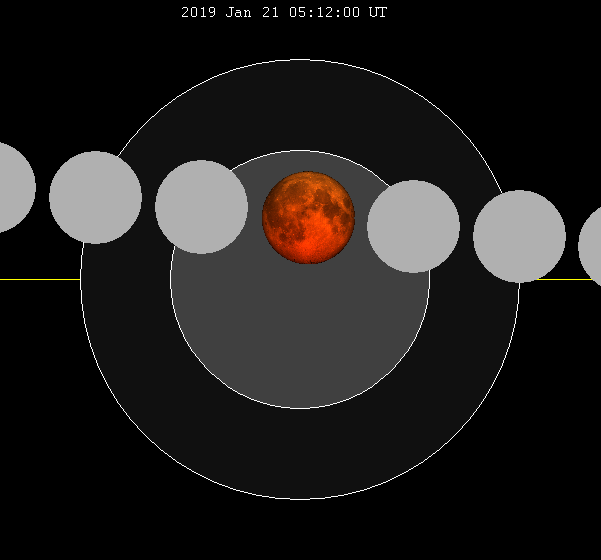
Contact points relative to Earth's umbral and penumbral shadows, here with the Moon near its descending node (left), and the hourly motion for the January 2019 lunar eclipse (right)

The timing of total lunar eclipses are determined by its contacts:
- P1 (First contact): Beginning of the penumbral eclipse. Earth's penumbra touches the Moon's outer limb.
- U1 (Second contact): Beginning of the partial eclipse. Earth's umbra touches the Moon's outer limb.
- U2 (Third contact): Beginning of the total eclipse. The Moon's surface is entirely within Earth's umbra.
- Greatest eclipse: The peak stage of the total eclipse. The Moon is at its closest to the center of Earth's umbra.
- U3 (Fourth contact): End of the total eclipse. The Moon's outer limb exits Earth's umbra.
- U4 (Fifth contact): End of the partial eclipse. Earth's umbra leaves the Moon's surface.
- P4 (Sixth contact): End of the penumbral eclipse. Earth's penumbra no longer makes contact with the Moon.

The penumbral phases of the eclipse changes the appearance of the Moon only slightly and is generally not noticeable.

Local times of contacts
Time zone adjustments from UTC		Americas					Atlantic			European/African			
Time zone adjustments from UTC		-8_{h}	-7_{h}	-6_{h}	-5_{h}	-4_{h}	-3_{h}	-2_{h}	-1_{h}	0_{h}	+1_{h}	+2_{h}	+3_{h}
Time zone adjustments from UTC		PST	MST	CST	EST	AST				GMT WET	WEST CET BST	CEST EET MSK−1	FET MSK EAT
Event		Evening 20 January						Morning 21 January					
P1	Penumbral begins*	6:37 pm	7:37 pm	8:37 pm	9:37 pm	10:37 pm	11:37 pm	12:37 am	1:37 am	2:37 am	3:37 am	4:37 am	5:37 am
U1	Partial begins	7:34 pm	8:34 pm	9:34 pm	10:34 pm	11:34 pm	12:34 am	1:34 am	2:34 am	3:34 am	4:34 am	5:34 am	6:34 am
U2	Total begins	8:41 pm	9:41 pm	10:41 pm	11:41 pm	12:41 am	1:41 am	2:41 am	3:41 am	4:41 am	5:41 am	6:41 am	7:41 am
	Mid-eclipse	9:12 pm	10:12 pm	11:12 pm	12:12 am	1:12 am	2:12 am	3:12 am	4:12 am	5:12 am	6:12 am	7:12 am	8:12 am
U3	Total ends	9:43 pm	10:43 pm	11:43 pm	12:43 am	1:43 am	2:43 am	3:43 am	4:43 am	5:43 am	6:43 am	7:43 am	8:43 am
U4	Partial ends	10:51 pm	11:51 pm	12:51 am	1:51 am	2:51 am	3:51 am	4:51 am	5:51 am	6:51 am	7:51 am	8:51 am	9:51 am
P4	Penumbral ends*	11:48 pm	12:48 am	1:48 am	2:48 am	3:48 am	4:48 am	5:48 am	6:48 am	7:48 am	8:48 am	9:48 am	10:48 am

== Gallery ==
=== America ===
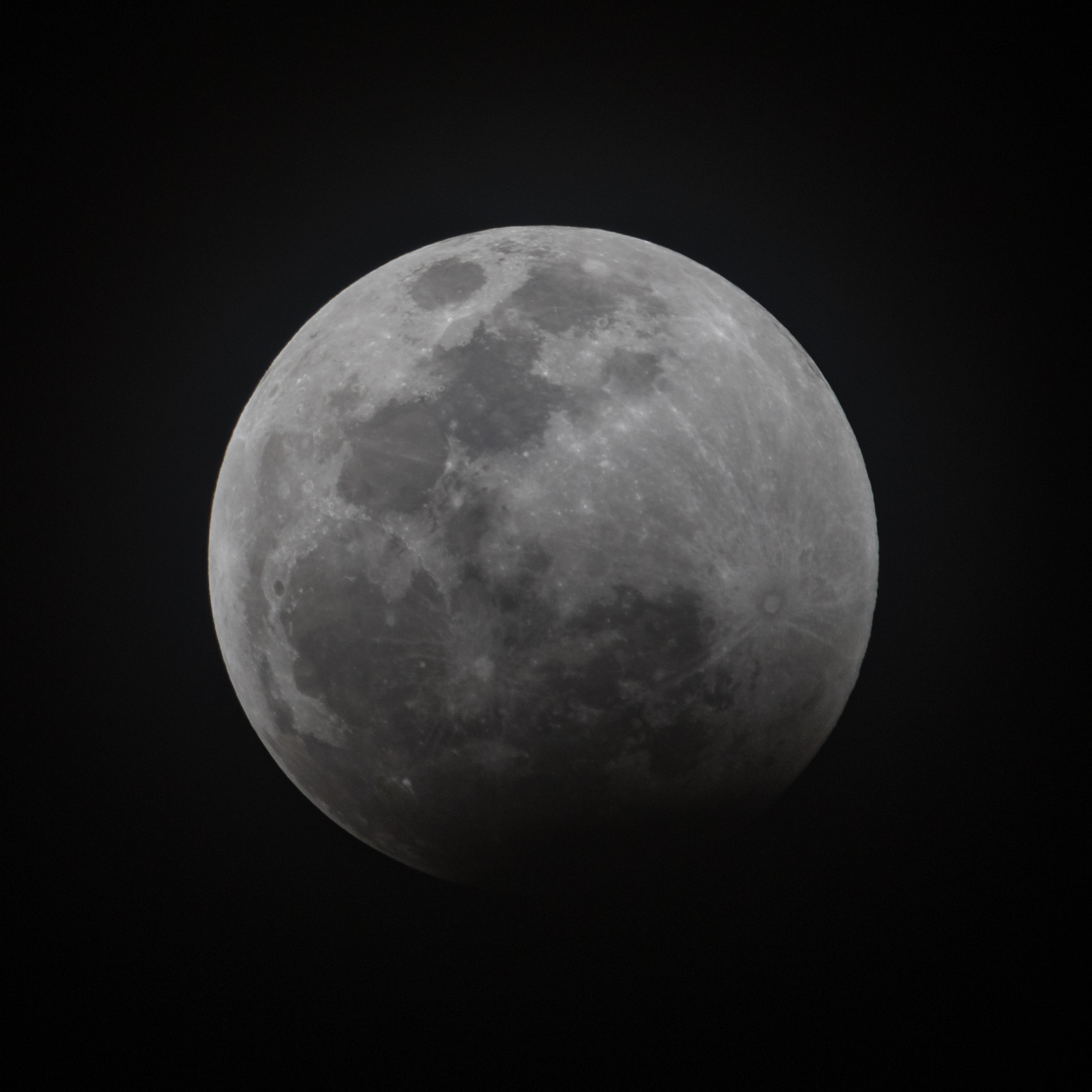
Austin, Texas, 3:57 UTC

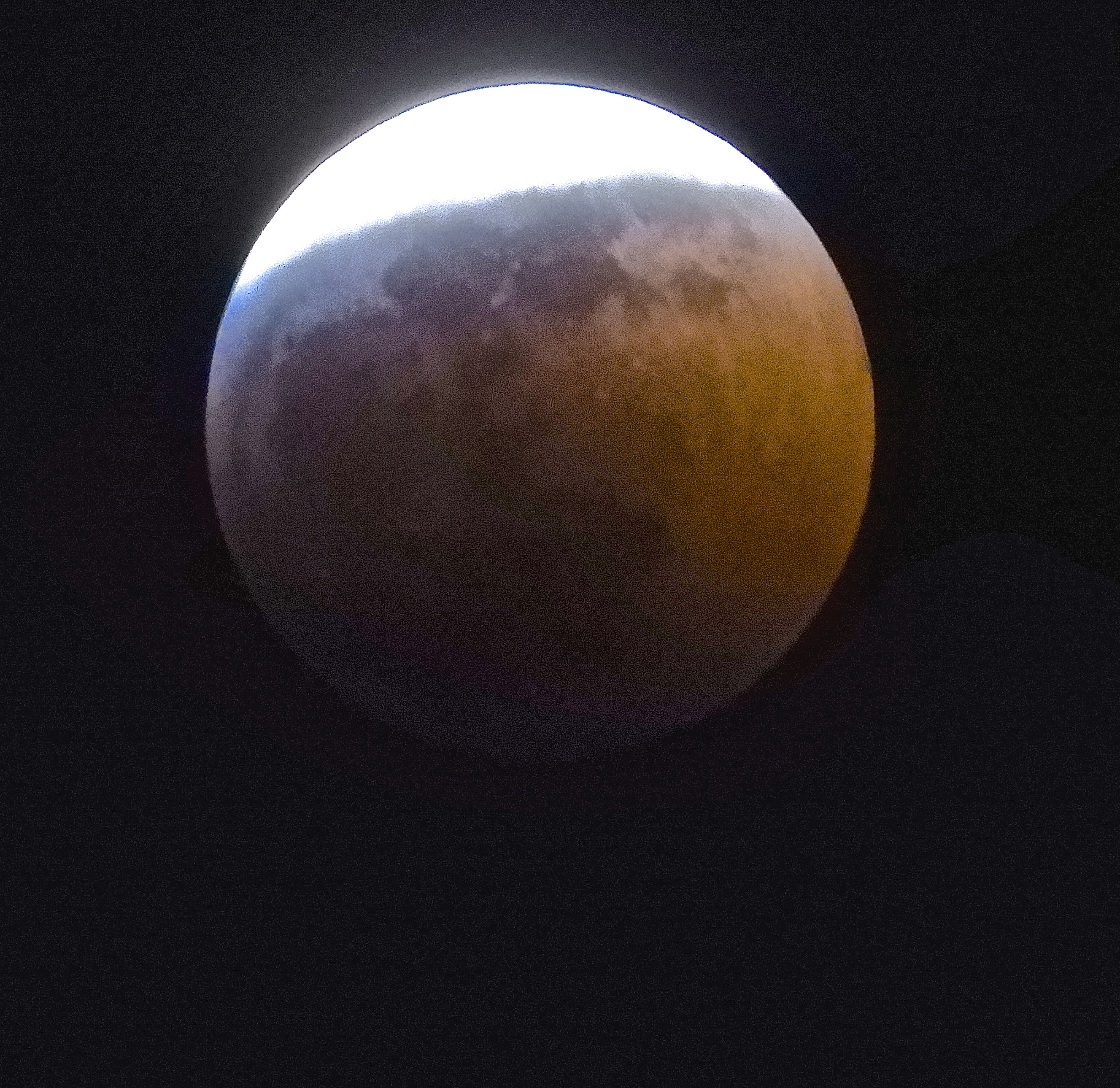
Seattle, Washington, 4:27 UTC

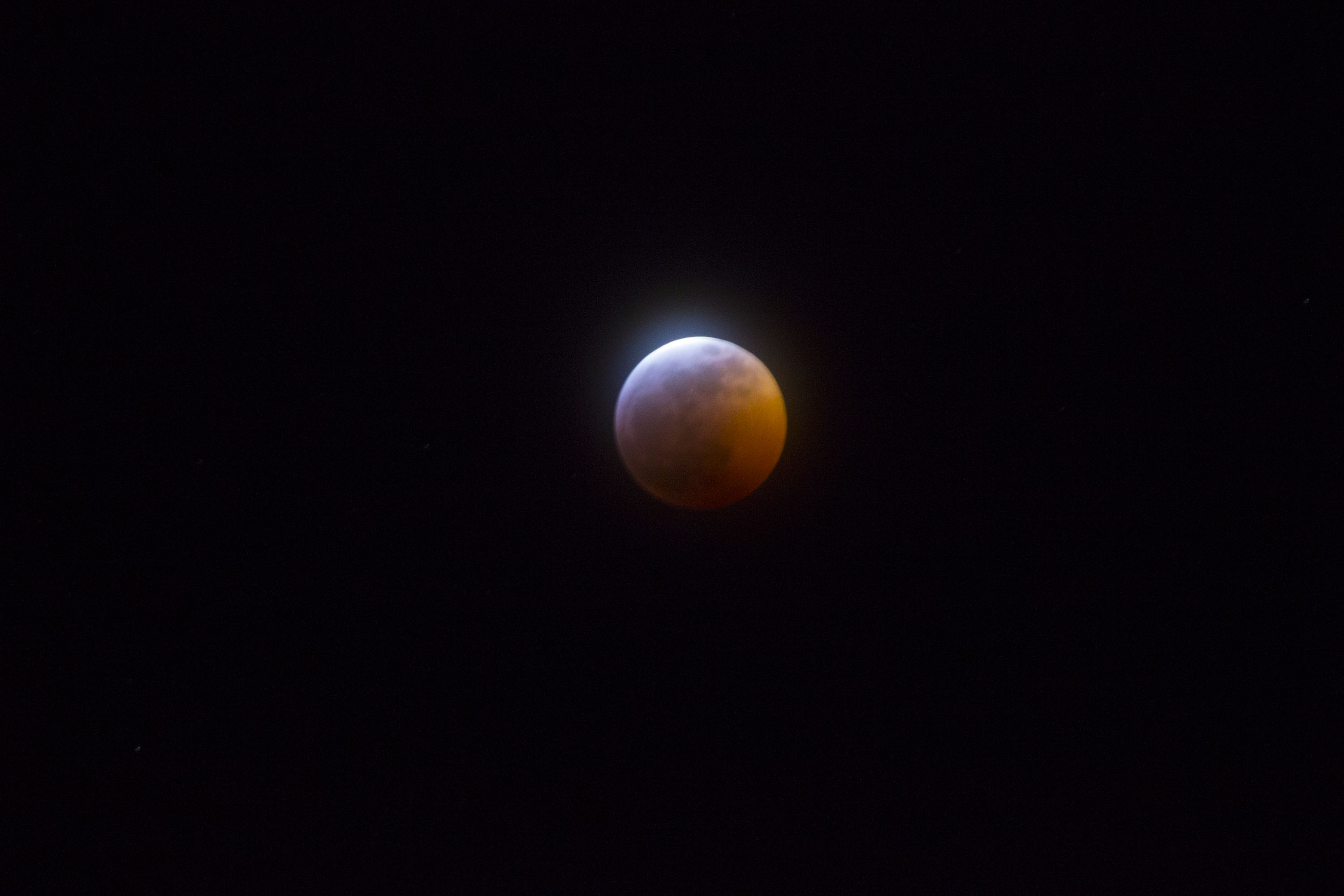
Lindsborg, Kansas, 4:40 UTC

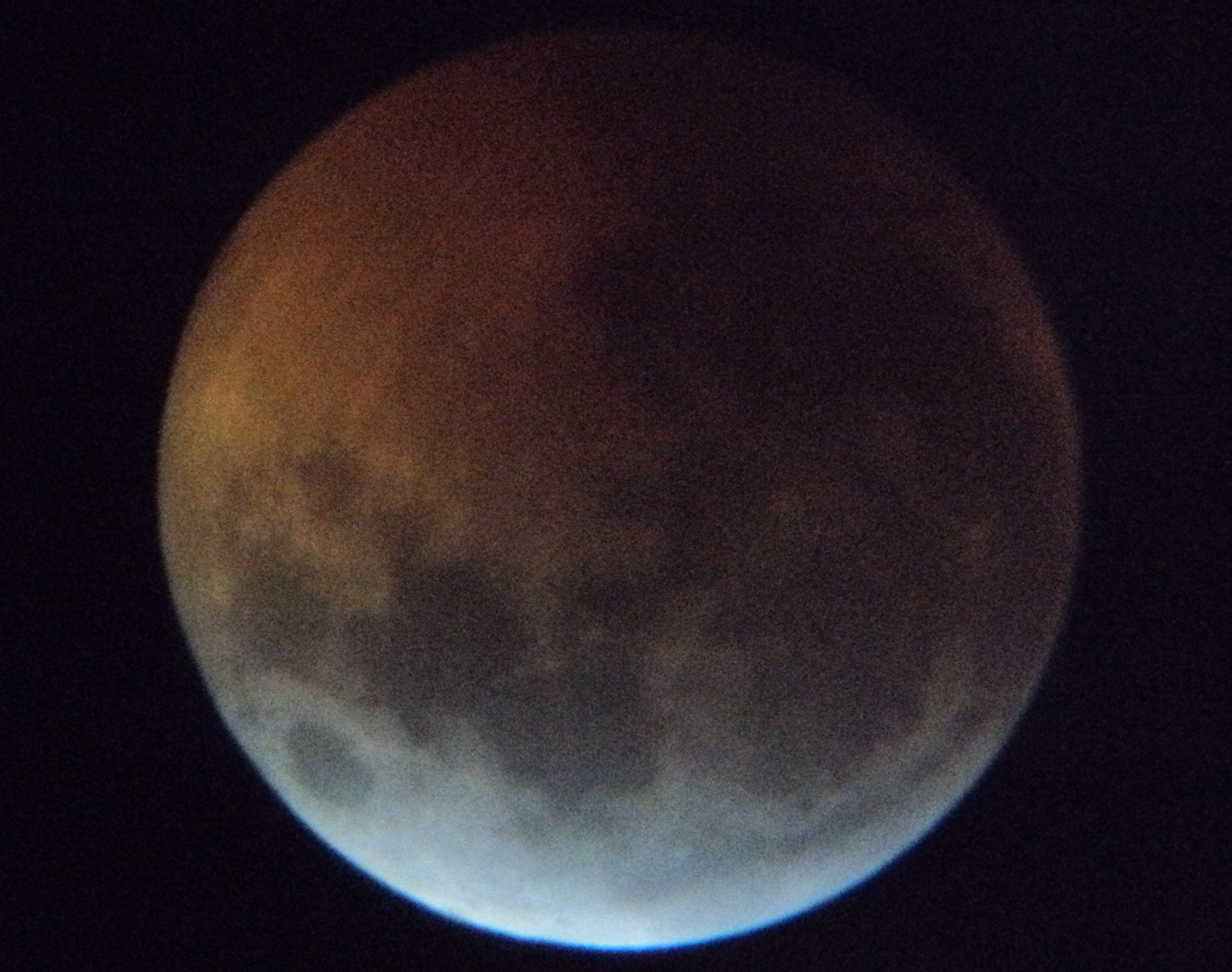
Buenos Aires, Argentina, 4:40 UTC

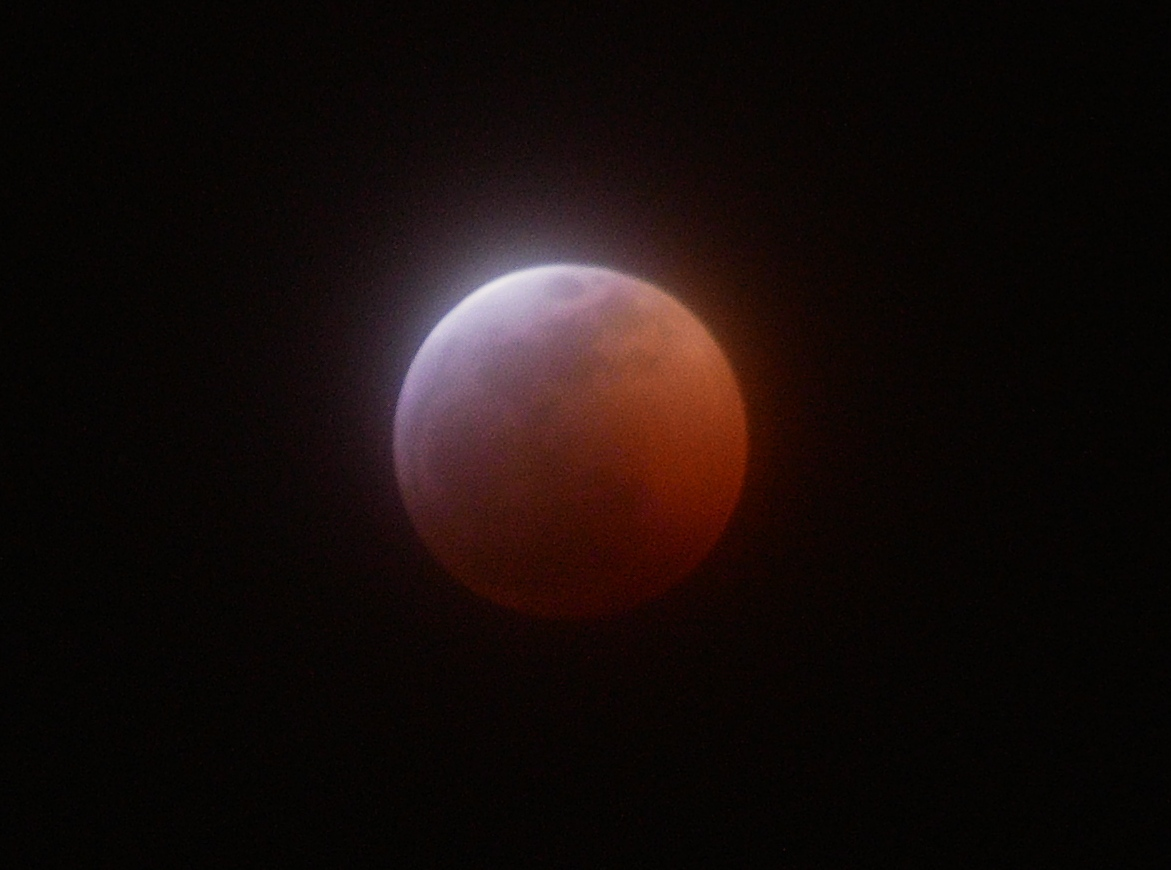
San Diego, California, 4:41 UTC

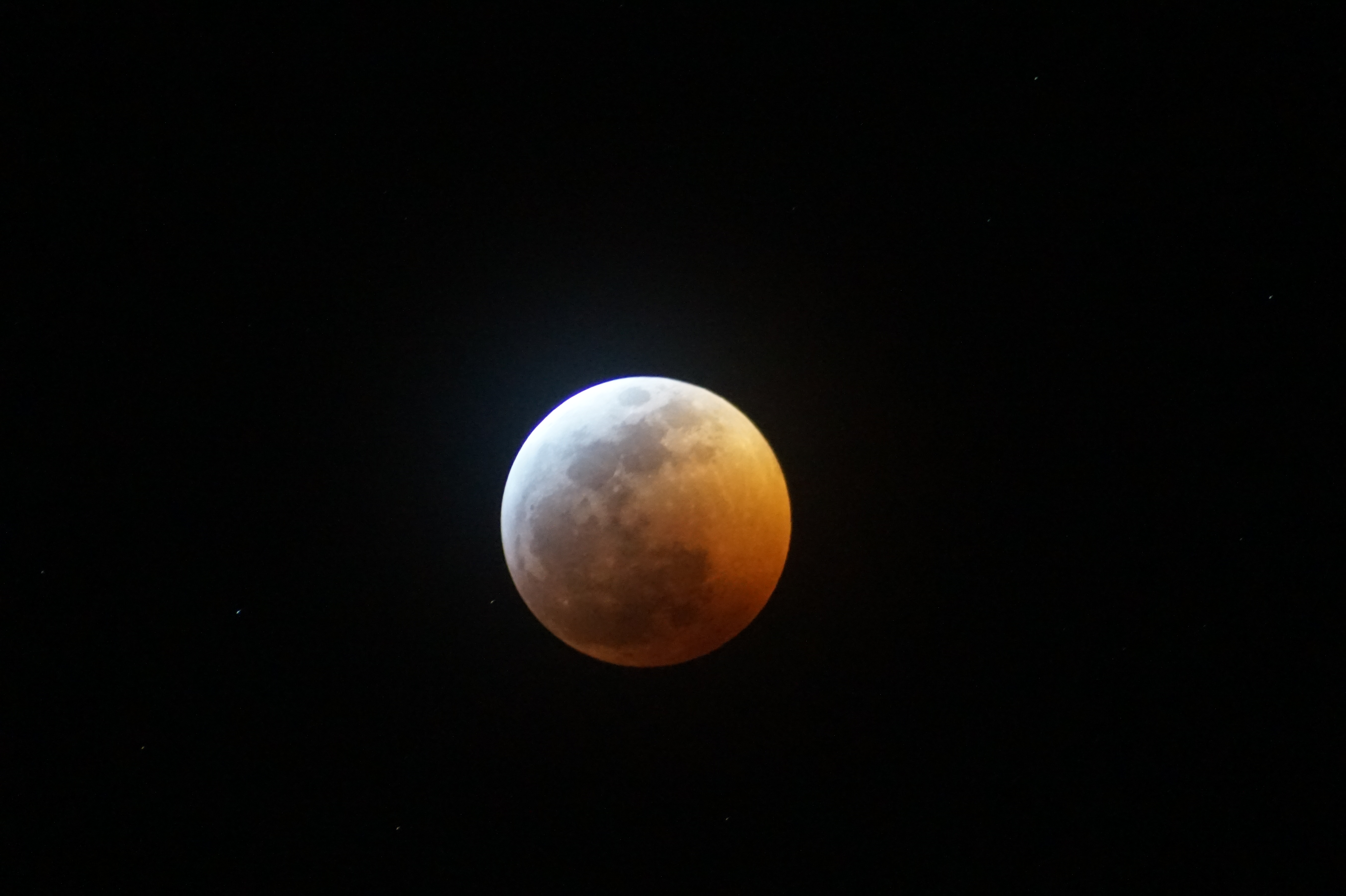
Tres Piedras, New Mexico, 4:42 UTC

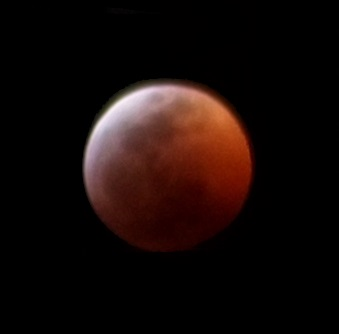
Chihuahua City, Mexico, 4:44 UTC

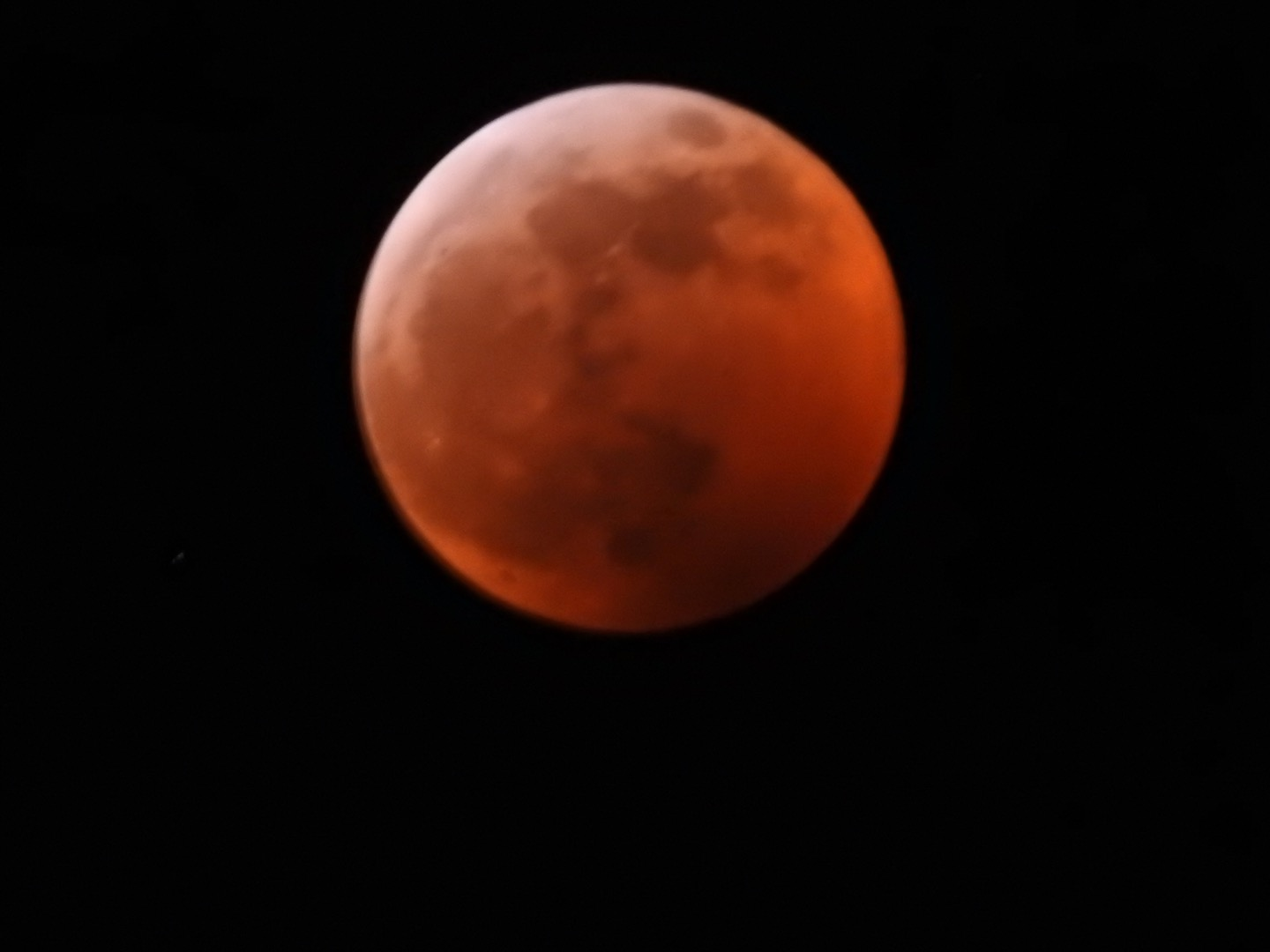
Chapel Hill, North Carolina, 5:02 UTC

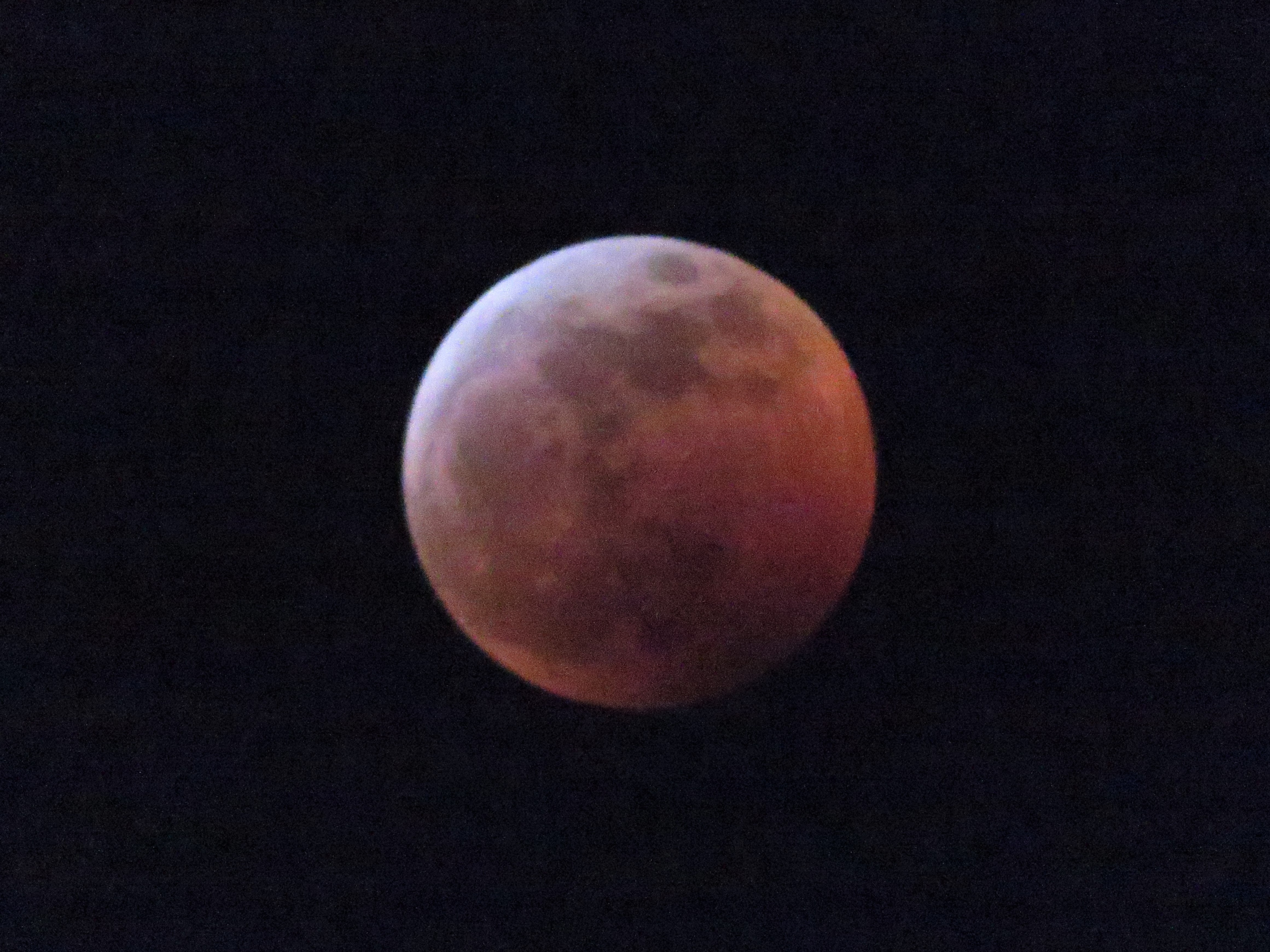
Denver, Colorado, 5:03 UTC

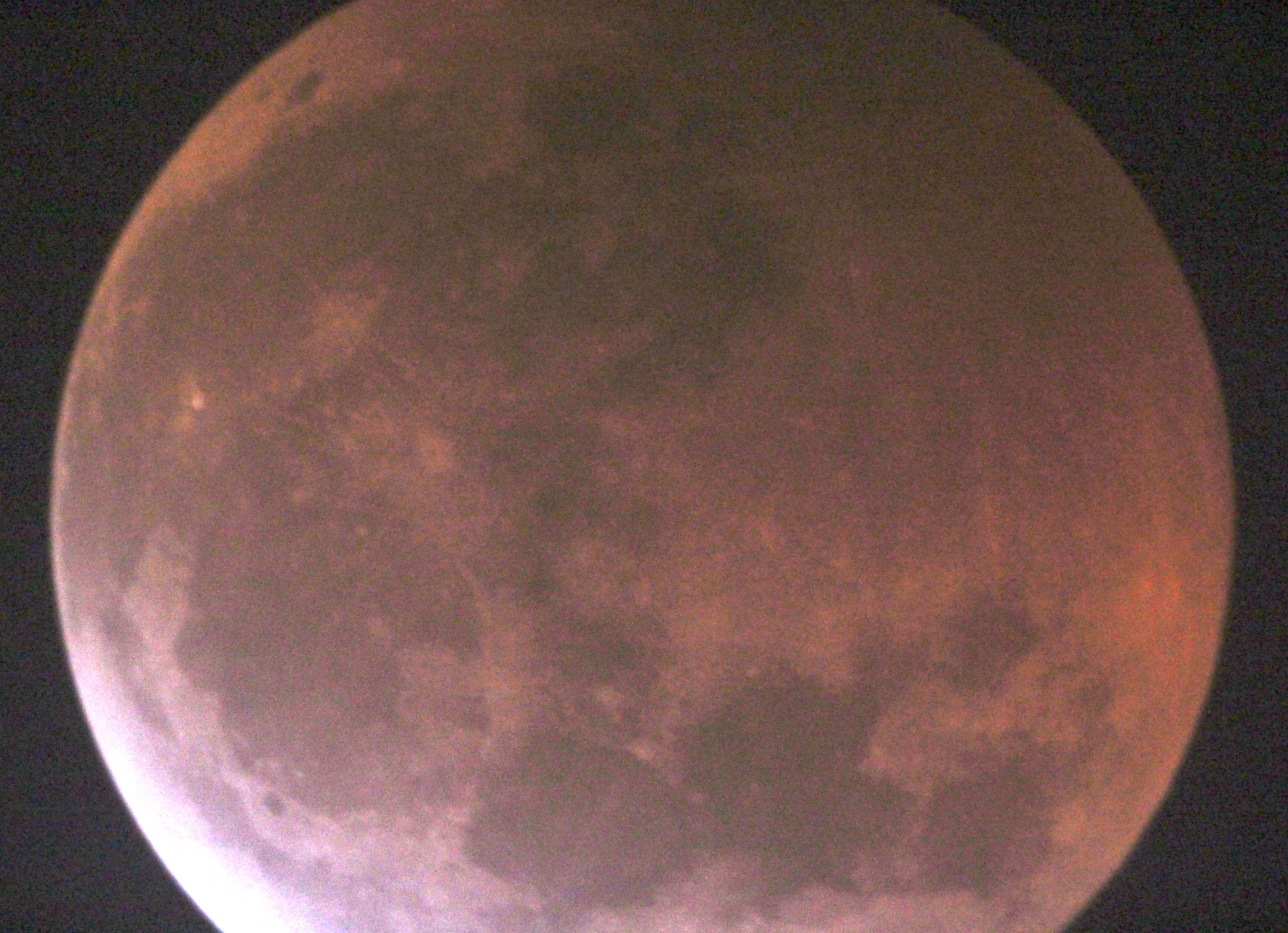
Totality in Coralville, Iowa, 5:07 UTC (23:07 Local Time)

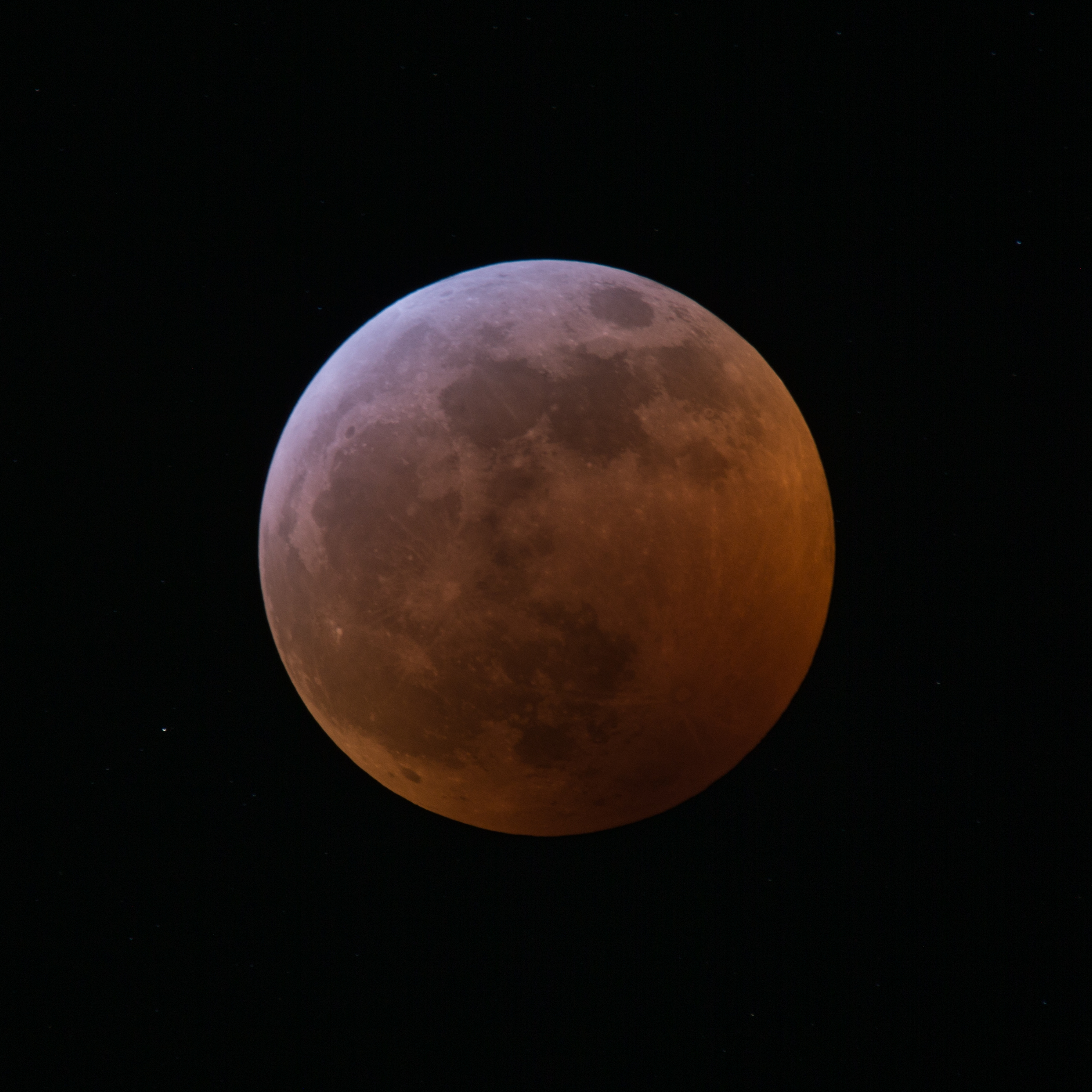
Macon, Georgia, 5:18 UTC

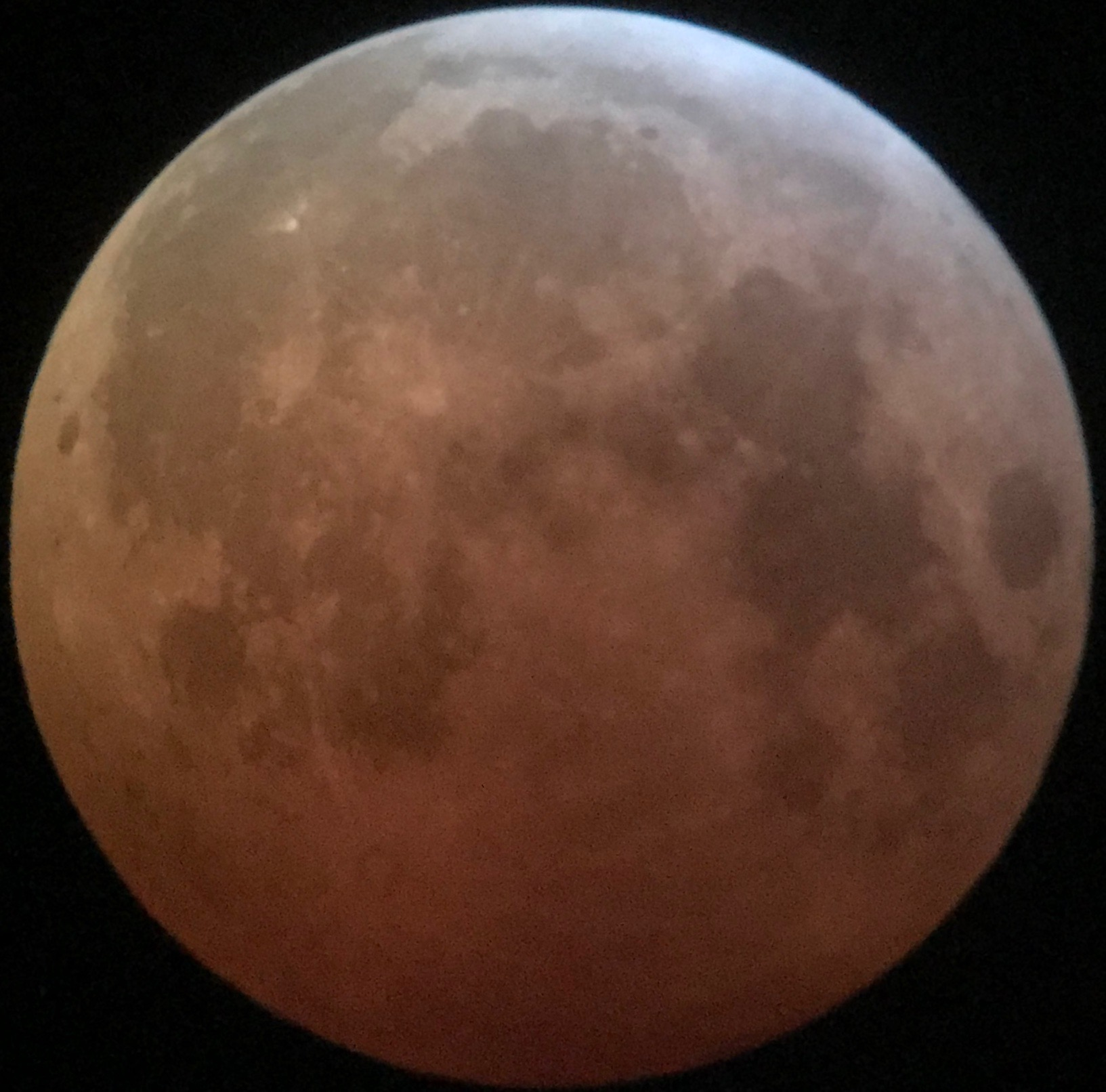
Whitpain Township, Pennsylvania, 5:26 UTC

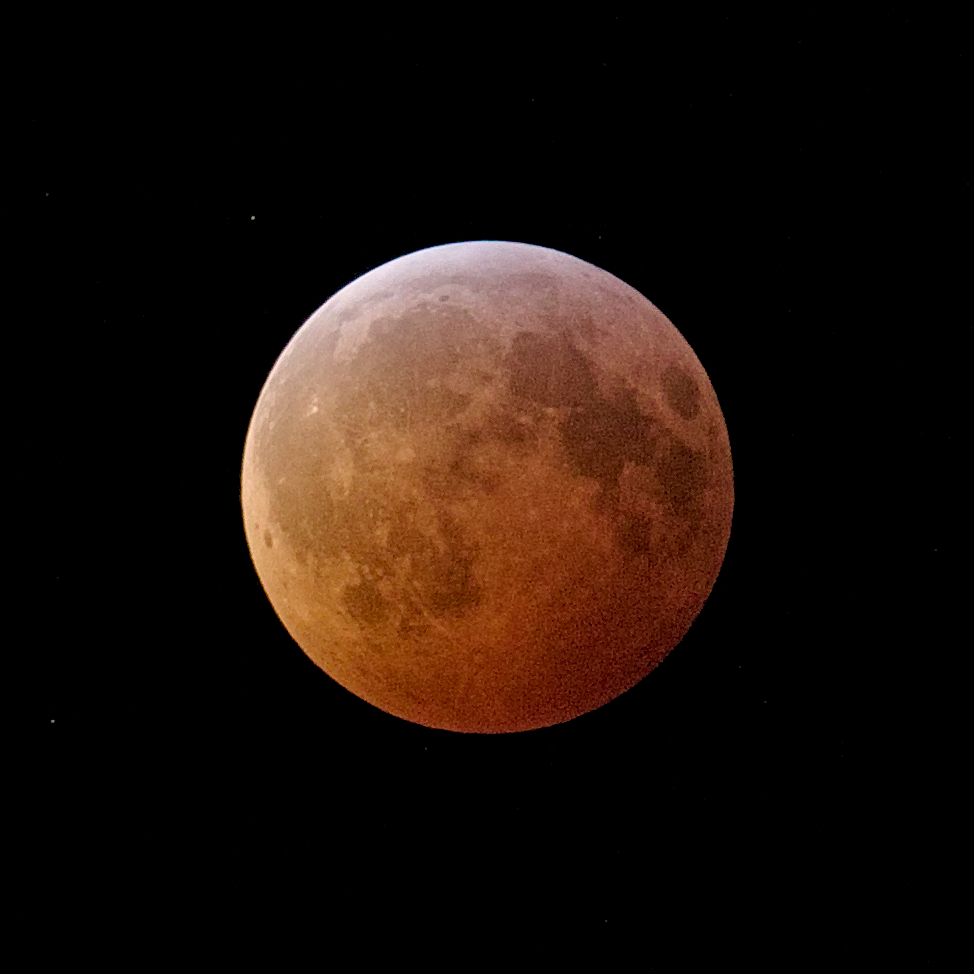
New York City, New York, 5:37 UTC

Animation from Taubaté, Brazil

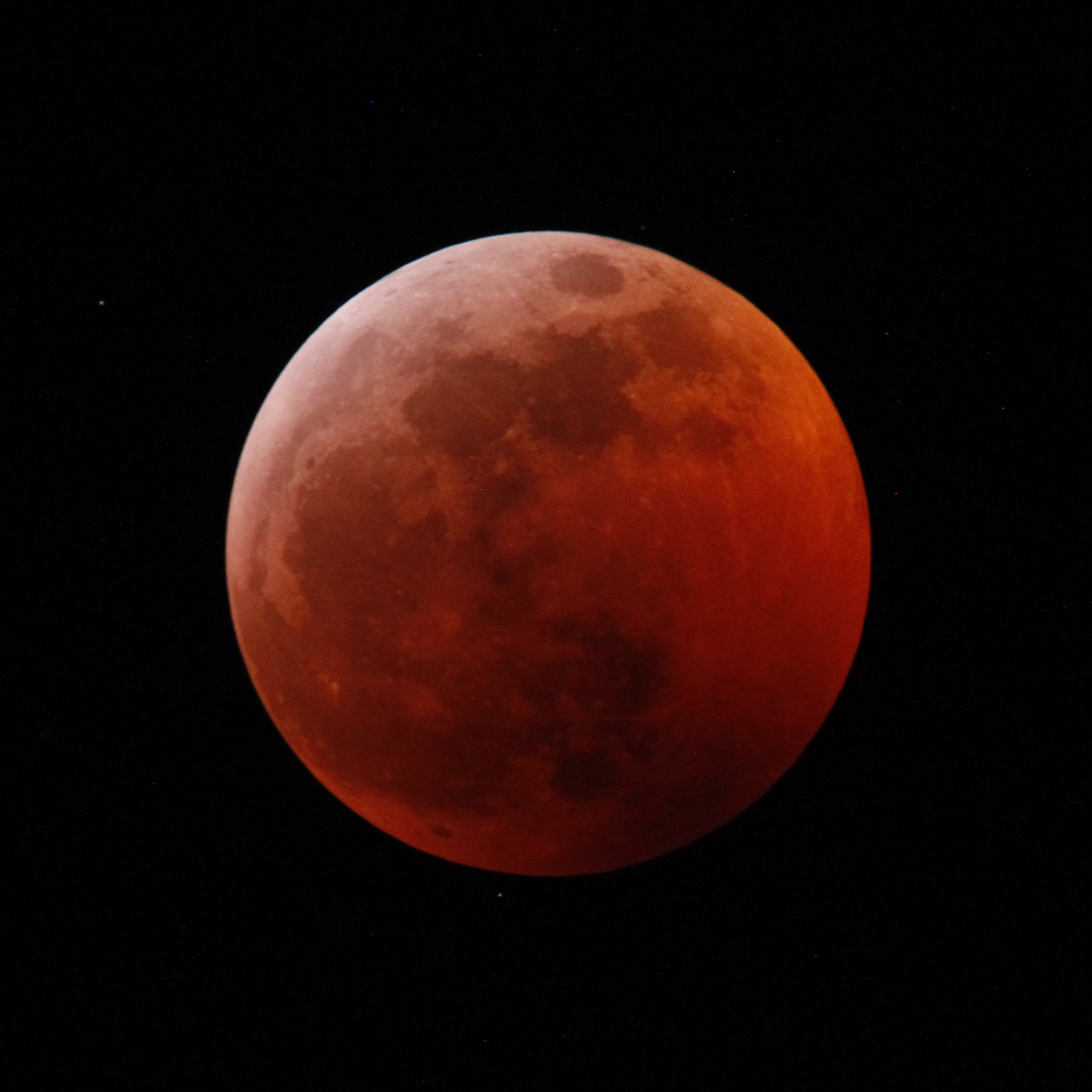
From Victoria, Canada at totality

=== Europe ===
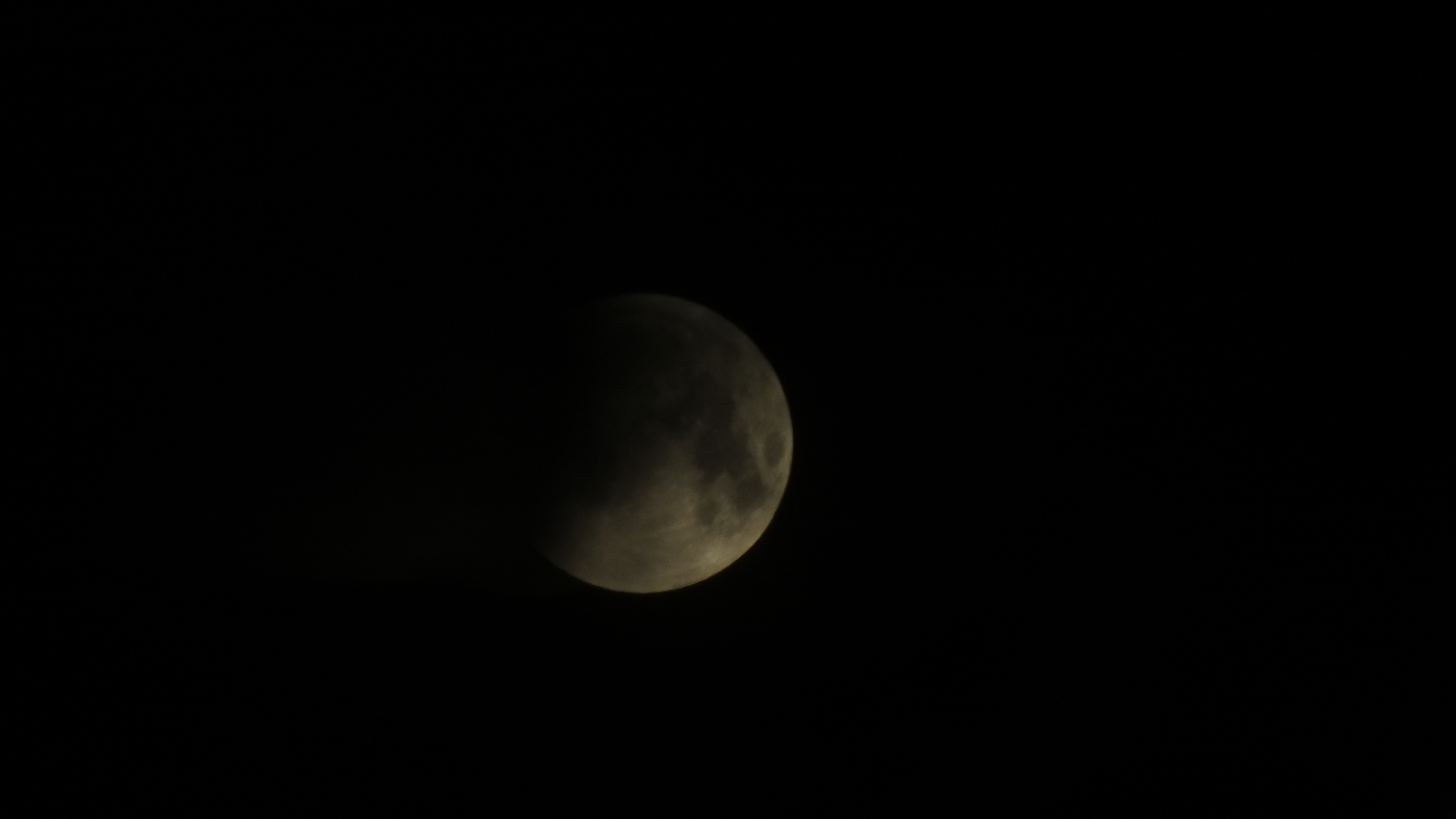
Partial from Moscow, Russia, 3:49 UTC

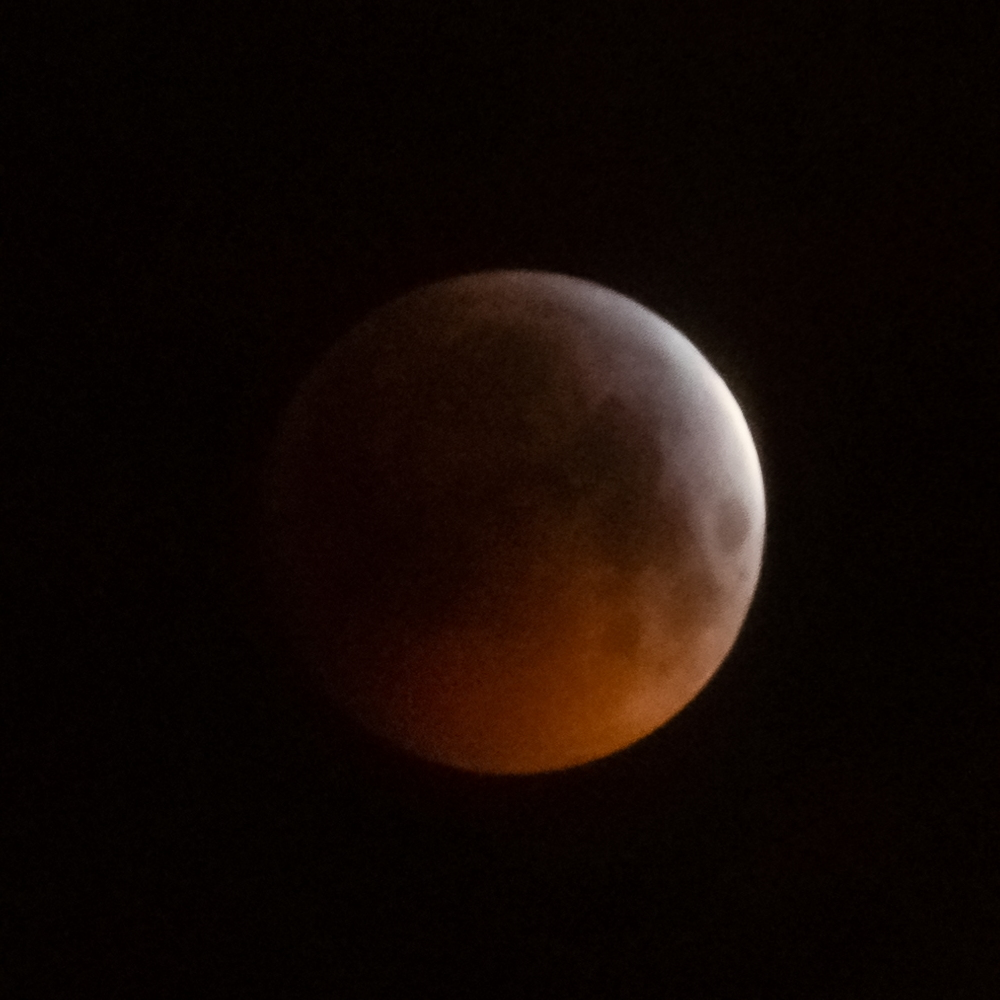
Estonia, 4:41 UTC

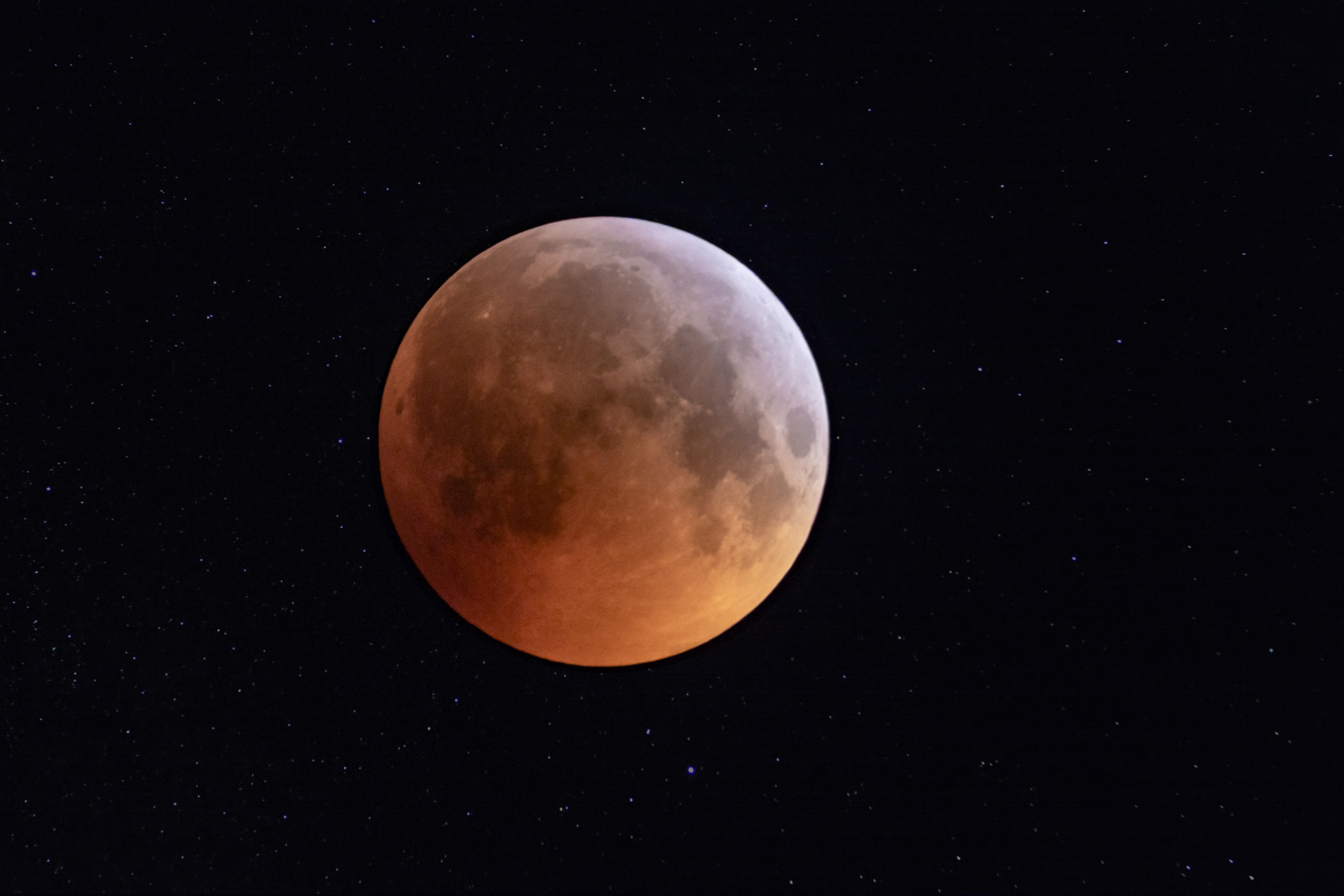
Järna, Sweden, 4:48 UTC

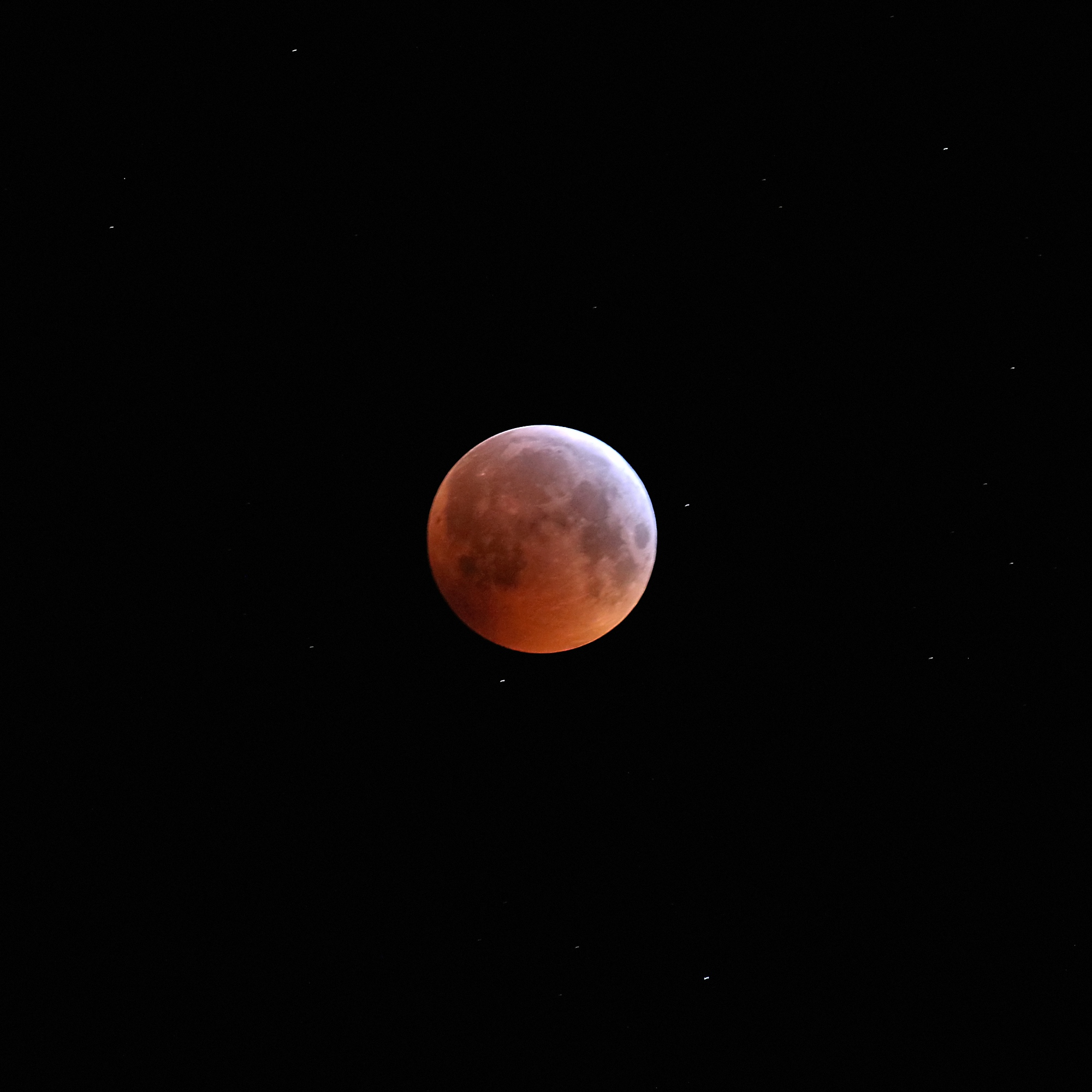
Finland, 6:02 UTC

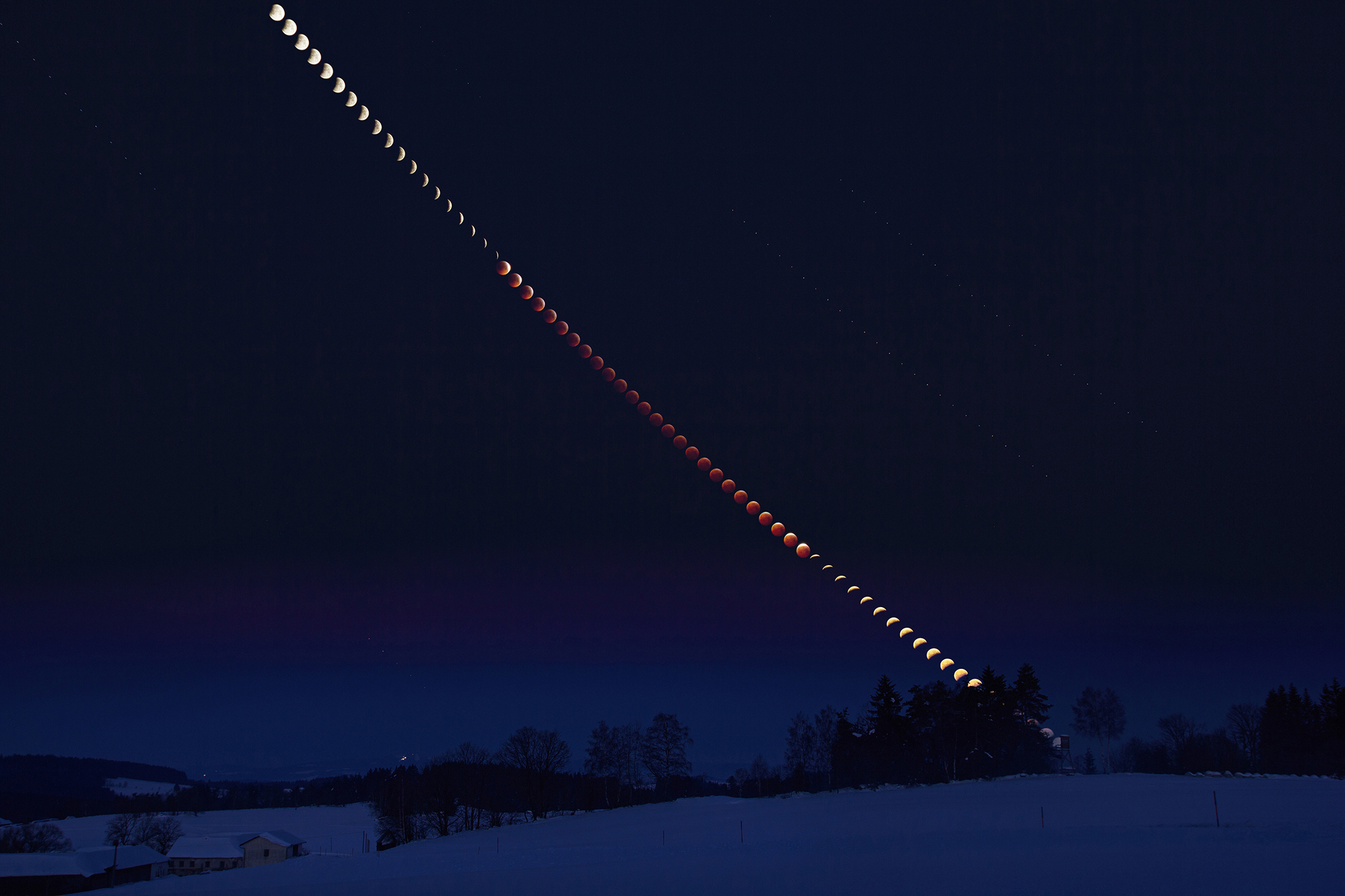
Sandl, Austria

== Impact sighted ==
Livestreams detected a flash of light while viewing the eclipse. It was "likely caused by the crash of a tiny, fast-moving meteoroid left behind by a comet."

Originally thinking it was electronic noise from the camera, astronomers and citizen scientists shared the visual phenomenon with each other to identify it.

When totality was just beginning at 4:41 UT, the tiny speck of light blinked south of a nearly 55-mile-wide crater in the western part of the moon.

The location of the impact may be somewhere in the lunar highlands, south of Byrgius crater, according to Justin Cowart, a graduate student in geosciences at Stony Brook University in New York who first saw the flash of light.

"A meteoroid about this size hits the moon about once a week or so," said Cowart.

This may be the first time that a collision, during a total lunar eclipse, was captured on video.

"I have not heard of anyone seeing an impact like this during a lunar eclipse before," said Sara Russell, a professor of planetary sciences at the Natural History Museum in London.

People posted their images and video of a flicker of light as news spread quickly on social media.

Working overtime, co-director of the Moon Impacts Detection and Analysis System, MIDAS, an astrophysicist at the University of Huelva in Spain, Jose Maria Madiedo, set up eight telescopes to watch for any impacts during the eclipse.

"Something inside of me told me that this time would be the time," said Madiedo.

A paper calculated a mass between 20 and 100 kilograms and diameter of 30 to 50 cm that may have caused a 7–15 meter crater located "inside a triangle with vertices in the Lagrange H, K and X craters". Other astronomers estimated a 10-15 meter crater from a 45 kg asteroid moving 61,000 km/h.

== Eclipse details ==
Shown below is a table displaying details about this particular lunar eclipse. It describes various parameters pertaining to this eclipse.

21 January 2019 Lunar Eclipse Parameters
Parameter	Value
Penumbral Magnitude	2.16972
Umbral Magnitude	1.19657
Gamma	0.36842
Sun Right Ascension	20h12m17.2s
Sun Declination	-19°57'48.1"
Sun Semi-Diameter	16'15.2"
Sun Equatorial Horizontal Parallax	08.9"
Moon Right Ascension	08h12m28.7s
Moon Declination	+20°20'13.2"
Moon Semi-Diameter	16'42.1"
Moon Equatorial Horizontal Parallax	1°01'17.9"
ΔT	69.1 s

== Eclipse season ==
This eclipse is part of an eclipse season, a period, roughly every six months, when eclipses occur. Only two (or occasionally three) eclipse seasons occur each year, and each season lasts about 35 days and repeats just short of six months (173 days) later; thus two full eclipse seasons always occur each year. Either two or three eclipses happen each eclipse season. In the sequence below, each eclipse is separated by a fortnight.

Eclipse season of January 2019
January 6 Descending node (new moon)	21 January Ascending node (full moon)
Partial solar eclipse Solar Saros 122	Total lunar eclipse Lunar Saros 134

== Related eclipses ==
=== Eclipses in 2019 ===
- A partial solar eclipse on January 6.
- A total lunar eclipse on 21 January.
- A total solar eclipse on July 2.
- A partial lunar eclipse on July 16.
- An annular solar eclipse on December 26.

=== Metonic ===
- Preceded by: Lunar eclipse of April 4, 2015
- Followed by: Lunar eclipse of November 8, 2022

=== Tzolkinex ===
- Preceded by: Lunar eclipse of December 10, 2011
- Followed by: Lunar eclipse of March 3, 2026

=== Half-Saros ===
- Preceded by: Solar eclipse of January 15, 2010
- Followed by: Solar eclipse of January 26, 2028

=== Tritos ===
- Preceded by: Lunar eclipse of February 21, 2008
- Followed by: Lunar eclipse of December 20, 2029

=== Lunar Saros 134 ===
- Preceded by: Lunar eclipse of January 9, 2001
- Followed by: Lunar eclipse of January 31, 2037

=== Inex ===
- Preceded by: Lunar eclipse of February 9, 1990
- Followed by: Lunar eclipse of January 1, 2048

=== Triad ===
- Preceded by: Lunar eclipse of March 22, 1932
- Followed by: Lunar eclipse of November 21, 2105

=== Lunar eclipses of 2016–2020 ===
This eclipse is a member of a semester series. An eclipse in a semester series of lunar eclipses repeats approximately every 177 days and 4 hours (a semester) at alternating nodes of the Moon's orbit.

The penumbral lunar eclipses on March 23, 2016 and September 16, 2016 occur in the previous lunar year eclipse set, and the penumbral lunar eclipses on June 5, 2020 and November 30, 2020 occur in the next lunar year eclipse set.

Lunar eclipse series sets from 2016 to 2020
Descending node				Ascending node			
Saros	Date Viewing	Type Chart	Gamma	Saros	Date Viewing	Type Chart	Gamma
109	2016 Aug 18	Penumbral	1.5641	114	2017 Feb 11	Penumbral	−1.0255
119	2017 Aug 07	Partial	0.8669	124	2018 Jan 31	Total	−0.3014
129	2018 Jul 27	Total	0.1168	134	2019 Jan 21	Total	0.3684
139	2019 Jul 16	Partial	−0.6430	144	2020 Jan 10	Penumbral	1.0727
149	2020 Jul 05	Penumbral	−1.3639				

=== Saros 134 ===
This eclipse is a part of Saros series 134, repeating every 18 years, 11 days, and containing 72 events. The series started with a penumbral lunar eclipse on April 1, 1550. It contains partial eclipses from July 7, 1694 through October 13, 1856; total eclipses from October 25, 1874 through July 26, 2325; and a second set of partial eclipses from August 7, 2343 through November 12, 2505. The series ends at member 72 as a penumbral eclipse on May 28, 2830.

The longest duration of totality will be produced by member 38 at 100 minutes, 23 seconds on May 22, 2217. All eclipses in this series occur at the Moon’s ascending node of orbit.

Greatest	First			
The greatest eclipse of the series will occur on 2217 May 22, lasting 100 minutes, 23 seconds.	Penumbral	Partial	Total	Central
The greatest eclipse of the series will occur on 2217 May 22, lasting 100 minutes, 23 seconds.	1550 Apr 01	1694 Jul 07	1874 Oct 25	2127 Mar 28
The greatest eclipse of the series will occur on 2217 May 22, lasting 100 minutes, 23 seconds.	Last			
The greatest eclipse of the series will occur on 2217 May 22, lasting 100 minutes, 23 seconds.	Central	Total	Partial	Penumbral
The greatest eclipse of the series will occur on 2217 May 22, lasting 100 minutes, 23 seconds.	2289 Jul 04	2325 Jul 26	2505 Nov 12	2830 May 28

Eclipses are tabulated in three columns; every third eclipse in the same column is one exeligmos apart, so they all cast shadows over approximately the same parts of the Earth.

Series members 15–37 occur between 1801 and 2200:
15	16	17
1802 Sep 11	1820 Sep 22	1838 Oct 03
18	19	20
1856 Oct 13	1874 Oct 25	1892 Nov 04
21	22	23
1910 Nov 17	1928 Nov 27	1946 Dec 08
24	25	26
1964 Dec 19	1982 Dec 30	2001 Jan 09
27	28	29
2019 Jan 21	2037 Jan 31	2055 Feb 11
30	31	32
2073 Feb 22	2091 Mar 05	2109 Mar 17
33	34	35
2127 Mar 28	2145 Apr 07	2163 Apr 19
36	37	
2181 Apr 29	2199 May 10	

=== Tritos series ===
This eclipse is a part of a tritos cycle, repeating at alternating nodes every 135 synodic months (≈ 3986.63 days, or 11 years minus 1 month). Their appearance and longitude are irregular due to a lack of synchronization with the anomalistic month (period of perigee), but groupings of 3 tritos cycles (≈ 33 years minus 3 months) come close (≈ 434.044 anomalistic months), so eclipses are similar in these groupings.

Series members between 1801 and 2200
1811 Sep 02 (Saros 115)	1822 Aug 03 (Saros 116)	1833 Jul 02 (Saros 117)	1844 May 31 (Saros 118)	1855 May 02 (Saros 119)
1866 Mar 31 (Saros 120)	1877 Feb 27 (Saros 121)	1888 Jan 28 (Saros 122)	1898 Dec 27 (Saros 123)	1909 Nov 27 (Saros 124)
1920 Oct 27 (Saros 125)	1931 Sep 26 (Saros 126)	1942 Aug 26 (Saros 127)	1953 Jul 26 (Saros 128)	1964 Jun 25 (Saros 129)
1975 May 25 (Saros 130)	1986 Apr 24 (Saros 131)	1997 Mar 24 (Saros 132)	2008 Feb 21 (Saros 133)	2019 Jan 21 (Saros 134)
2029 Dec 20 (Saros 135)	2040 Nov 18 (Saros 136)	2051 Oct 19 (Saros 137)	2062 Sep 18 (Saros 138)	2073 Aug 17 (Saros 139)
2084 Jul 17 (Saros 140)	2095 Jun 17 (Saros 141)	2106 May 17 (Saros 142)	2117 Apr 16 (Saros 143)	2128 Mar 16 (Saros 144)
2139 Feb 13 (Saros 145)	2150 Jan 13 (Saros 146)	2160 Dec 13 (Saros 147)	2171 Nov 12 (Saros 148)	2182 Oct 11 (Saros 149)
2193 Sep 11 (Saros 150)

=== Inex series ===
This eclipse is a part of the long period inex cycle, repeating at alternating nodes, every 358 synodic months (≈ 10,571.95 days, or 29 years minus 20 days). Their appearance and longitude are irregular due to a lack of synchronization with the anomalistic month (period of perigee). However, groupings of 3 inex cycles (≈ 87 years minus 2 months) comes close (≈ 1,151.02 anomalistic months), so eclipses are similar in these groupings.

Series members between 1801 and 2200
1816 Jun 10 (Saros 127)	1845 May 21 (Saros 128)	1874 May 01 (Saros 129)
1903 Apr 12 (Saros 130)	1932 Mar 22 (Saros 131)	1961 Mar 02 (Saros 132)
1990 Feb 09 (Saros 133)	2019 Jan 21 (Saros 134)	2048 Jan 01 (Saros 135)
2076 Dec 10 (Saros 136)	2105 Nov 21 (Saros 137)	2134 Nov 02 (Saros 138)
2163 Oct 12 (Saros 139)	2192 Sep 21 (Saros 140)	

=== Half-Saros cycle ===
A lunar eclipse will be preceded and followed by solar eclipses by 9 years and 5.5 days (a half saros). This lunar eclipse is related to two annular solar eclipses of Solar Saros 141.

January 15, 2010	January 26, 2028

== See also ==
- List of lunar eclipses and List of 21st-century lunar eclipses
