= Rimae Sirsalis =

Rille on the Moon

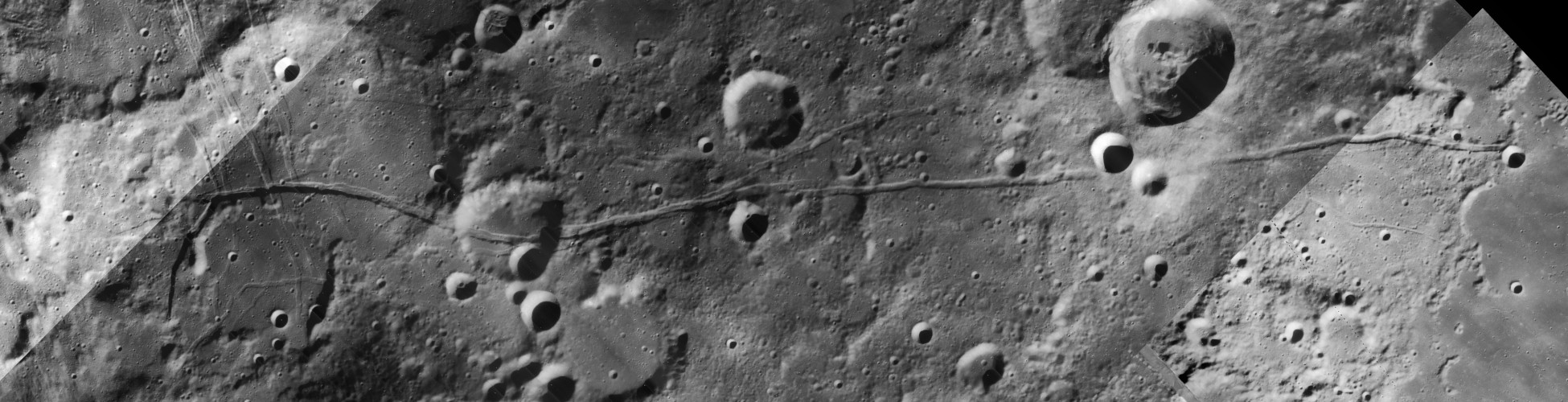
Rimae Sirsalis. Lunar Orbiter 4 mosaic with north at upper right.

Rimae Sirsalis is a lunar rille. It is located at 15.7°S 61.7°W and is 426 km long. It was formed by extension of the surface, possibly due to dike propagation in the subsurface.

Rimae Sirsalis cuts across highlands almost exclusively. It starts at the edge of Oceanus Procellarum near the modest crater Sirsalis from which it gets its name and proceeds directly away from the mare, eventually ending up among the cracks in the floor of the crater Darwin. Along the way it passes through craters, ranges of hills, and other small rilles.

This rille is the site of a lunar swirl pattern and its associated magnetic anomaly.
