= Sirsalis (crater) =

Crater on the Moon

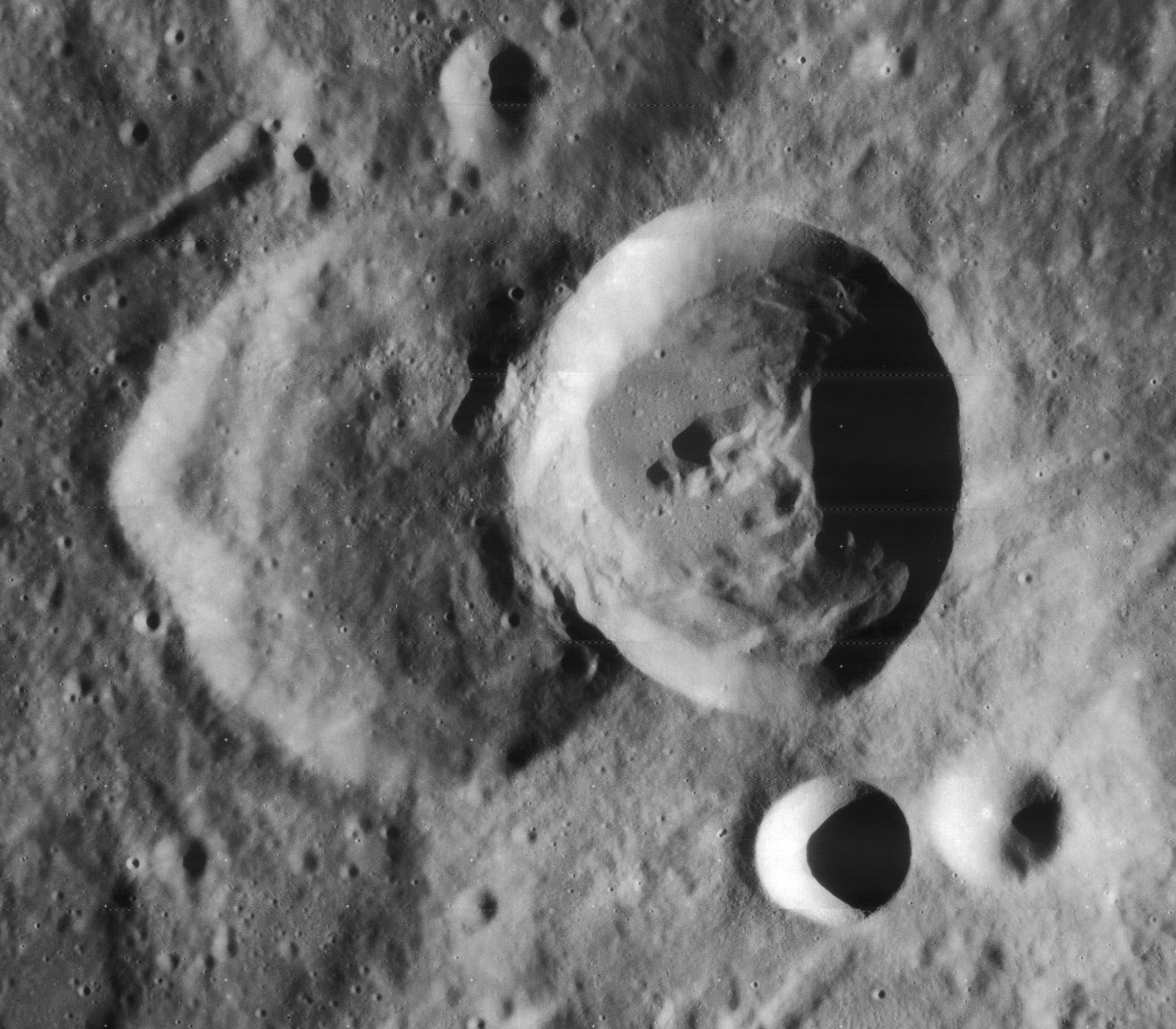
- Lunar Orbiter 4 image showing Sirsalis at right of center, Sirsalis A at left of center, and Sirsalis F and J in lower right
- Coordinates: 12.5°S 60.4°W
- Diameter: 42 km
- Depth: 3.0 km
- Colongitude: 61° at sunrise
- Eponym: Gerolamo Sersale

Sirsalis is a relatively young lunar impact crater located near the western lunar limb, to the southwest of the Oceanus Procellarum. The crater lies across a ridge that runs in a north–south direction. It has a sharp edge and a low central peak. The crater overlaps the slightly larger and older Sirsalis A to the west-southwest, and the two form a distinctive feature.

To the east is a rille system named the Rimae Sirsalis. The longest of these rilles follows a line running approximately north-northeast to south-southwest, just clearing the southeastern rim of Sirsalis by about 10 kilometers. This long rille runs 330 kilometers from the shore of Oceanus Procellarum until it crosses the crater Darwin A and intersects the Rimae Darwin to the east of Darwin.

== Bertaud ==
Satellite crater Sirsalis A, west of Sirsalis itself, was called Bertaud by Hugh Percy Wilkins and Patrick Moore. This name was not accepted by the International Astronomical Union (IAU), but is still seen on older maps of the moon.

== Satellite crater Sirsalis F during and after full moon ==
Immediately south of Sirsalis, the bright bowl-shaped crater Sirsalis F is an eye catcher during and after full moon. The remarkable brightness of it could also be seen during last quarter moon. Its brightness is also noticeable on the photographic version of chart LAC 74 (page 148) in The Clementine Atlas of the Moon (Ben Bussey / Paul D. Spudis).

== Satellite craters ==
By convention these features are identified on lunar maps by placing the letter on the side of the crater midpoint that is closest to Sirsalis.

Sirsalis	Latitude	Longitude	Diameter
A	12.7° S	61.3° W	49 km
B	11.1° S	63.7° W	16 km
C	10.3° S	63.8° W	22 km
D	9.9° S	58.6° W	35 km
E	8.1° S	56.5° W	72 km
F	13.5° S	60.1° W	13 km
G	13.7° S	61.7° W	30 km
H	14.0° S	62.4° W	26 km
J	13.4° S	59.8° W	12 km
K	10.4° S	57.3° W	7 km
T	9.2° S	53.4° W	16 km
Z	10.7° S	61.9° W	91 km

Between Sirsalis J and Fontana C is a lunar swirl feature and an associated magnetic anomaly.
