= Gerolamo Sersale =

Italian Jesuit astronomer and selenographer

- Born: 1584; Naples, Kingdom of Naples
- Died: 1 December 1654 (aged 69–70); Naples, Kingdom of Naples
- Other names: Hieronymus Sirsalis
- Scientific career
- Fields: Mathematics, Astronomy

Gerolamo Sersale (in Latin, Hieronymus Sirsalis) (Naples, 1584–Naples, 1 December 1654) was an Italian Jesuit astronomer and selenographer. His surname is from a noble Neapolitan family that originated in Sorrento. The town Sersale, a commune in the southern Italian province of Catanzaro, was founded in 1620. A Jesuit priest, Sersale drew a fairly precise map of a full moon observed on 13 July 1650. The map was engraved in 1651 and was studied by other astronomers, like Grimaldi and praised and mentioned in Riccioli's Almagestum novum and Astronomia reformata. However, today it can be seen in the Naval Observatory of San Fernando in Cadiz, Spain. With his telescope, the Jesuit Father Daniele Bartoli was able to see two spots on Mars in Naples in 1644.

The lunar crater Sirsalis is named after him.

== See also ==
- List of Jesuit scientists
- List of Roman Catholic scientist-clerics

== Sources ==
- (in German) Geschichte der Mondkarten
- (in English) Jesuit Lunar Craters
