= Lacus Aestatis =

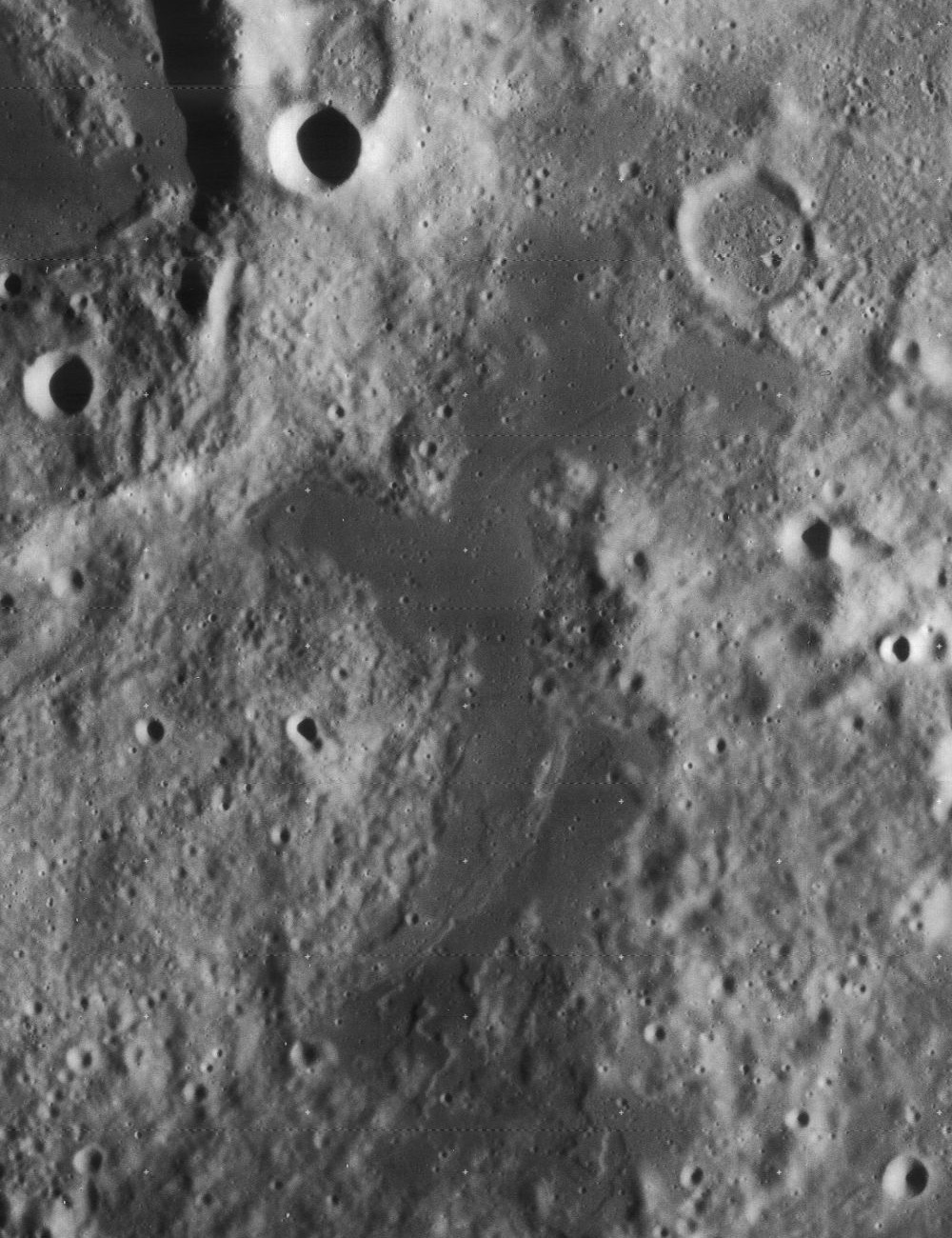
- Lunar Orbiter 4 image
- Coordinates: 15.0°S 69.0°W
- Diameter: 90 km
- Eponym: Summer Lake

Lacus Aestatis (Latin aestātis, "Summer Lake") consists of two relatively small patches of smooth, interconnected lunar mare, located near the western limb of the Moon in the southwestern highlands. It was originally called Mare Aestatis but was renamed at the 1970 IAU convention. The selenographic coordinates of this feature are 15.0° S, 69.0° W, and it lies within a diameter of 90 km. The lake has a combined surface area in the order of 400 km^{2}.

The northwestern part of this feature is located to the east-southeast of the crater Rocca, and is contained within the rim of the satellite crater Rocca A. The other part lies to the southeast of the first, and forms an elongated, irregular patch that extends generally in a north-south direction. The southern tip lies about one crater diameter to the northwest of the flooded crater Crüger. Crater counts of this feature yield an age of 3.50 Gyr for the basalt, placing its formation in the Imbrian era.
