= Lamarck (crater) =

Crater on the Moon

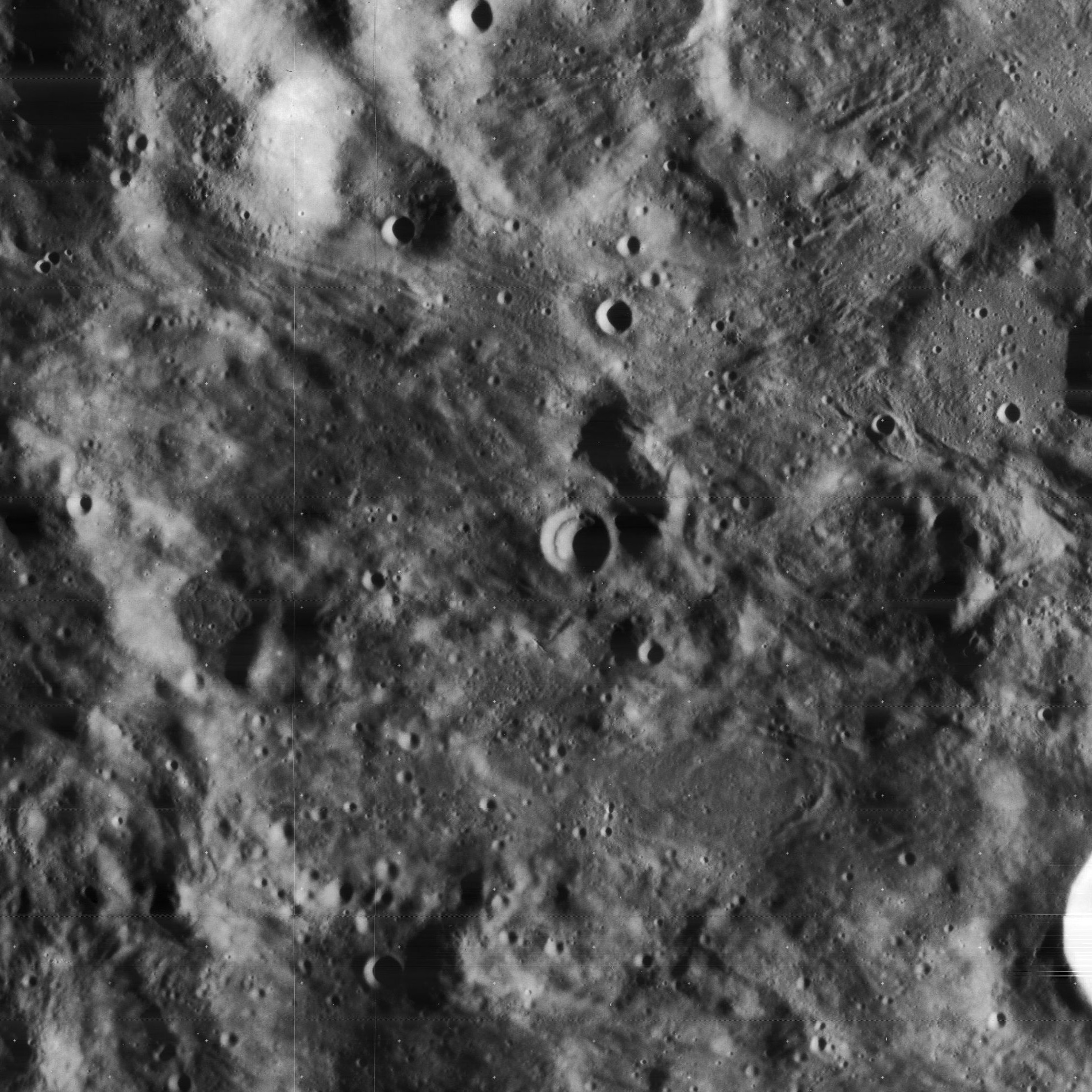
- Lunar Orbiter 4 image
- Coordinates: 22.9°S 69.8°W
- Diameter: 100 km
- Depth: 2.8 km
- Colongitude: 72° at sunrise
- Eponym: Jean-Baptiste Lamarck

Lamarck is a crater in the southwestern part of the Moon. The northern portion of the crater is overlain by the walled plain named Darwin. To the southeast is Byrgius.

The outer wall of this formation has been heavily damaged by subsequent impacts, leaving a disintegrated rim that forms a low, irregular ridge in the surface. Parts of the crater are also overlain by ejecta from the Mare Orientale basin to the east. The most notable feature in the interior is the tiny, bowl-shaped impact crater Lamarck B. The remainder of the floor forms a rolling, uneven plain.

Attached to the southwestern rim is Lamarck A, a large but equally disintegrated crater. Lamarck D is a huge formation that lies to the west of Lamarck A. However, this last feature is also worn to the point where it is barely recognizable as a crater.

This crater is named after French naturalist Jean-Baptiste Lamarck (1744–1829).

== Satellite craters ==
By convention these features are identified on lunar maps by placing the letter on the side of the crater midpoint that is closest to Lamarck.

Lamarck	Latitude	Longitude	Diameter
A	25.2° S	70.8° W	51 km
B	22.8° S	69.7° W	7 km
D	25.0° S	74.1° W	131 km
E	26.8° S	75.7° W	9 km
F	27.0° S	73.9° W	9 km
G	27.1° S	72.1° W	15 km

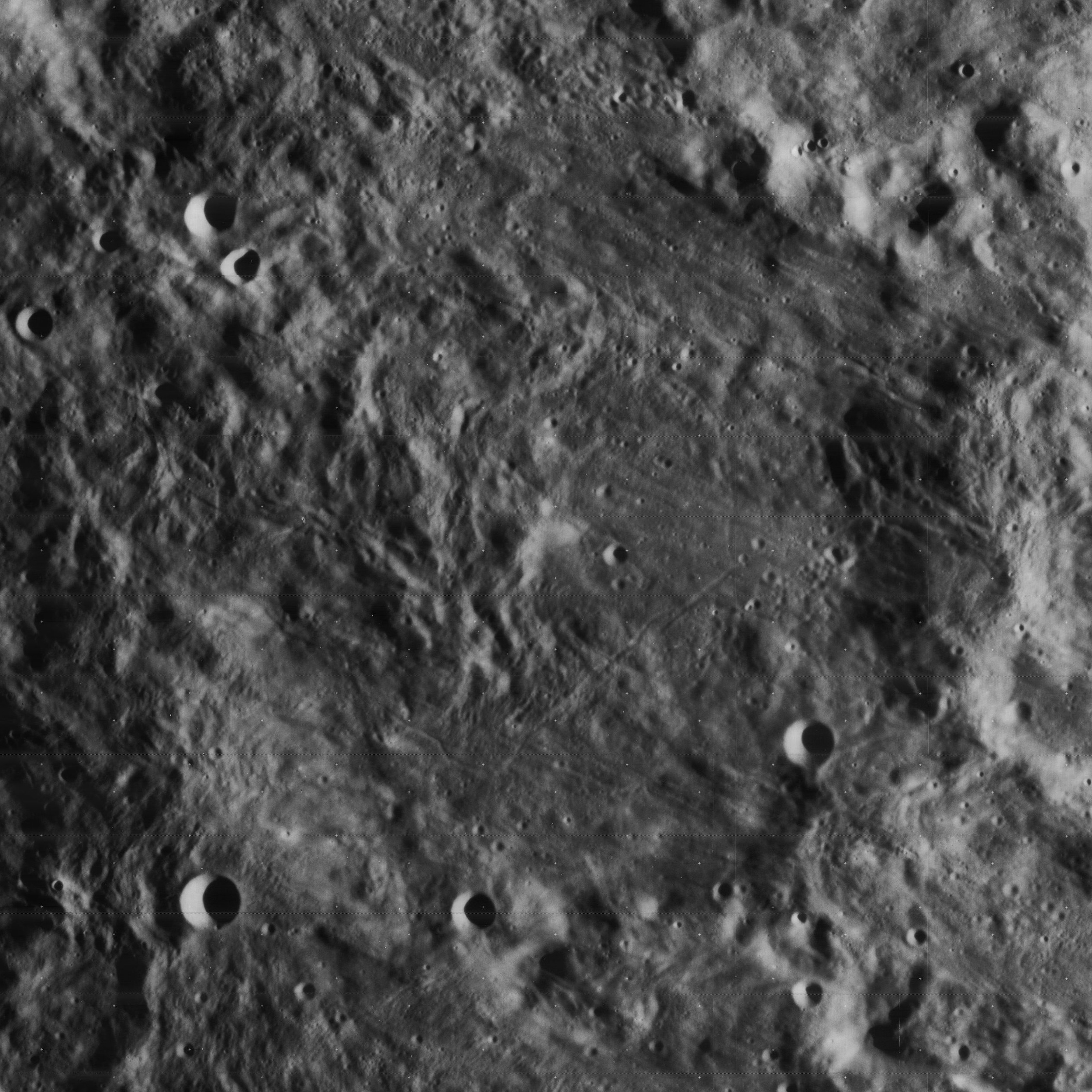
Lamarck D
