= Byrgius (crater) =

Crater on the Moon

Byrgius Crater
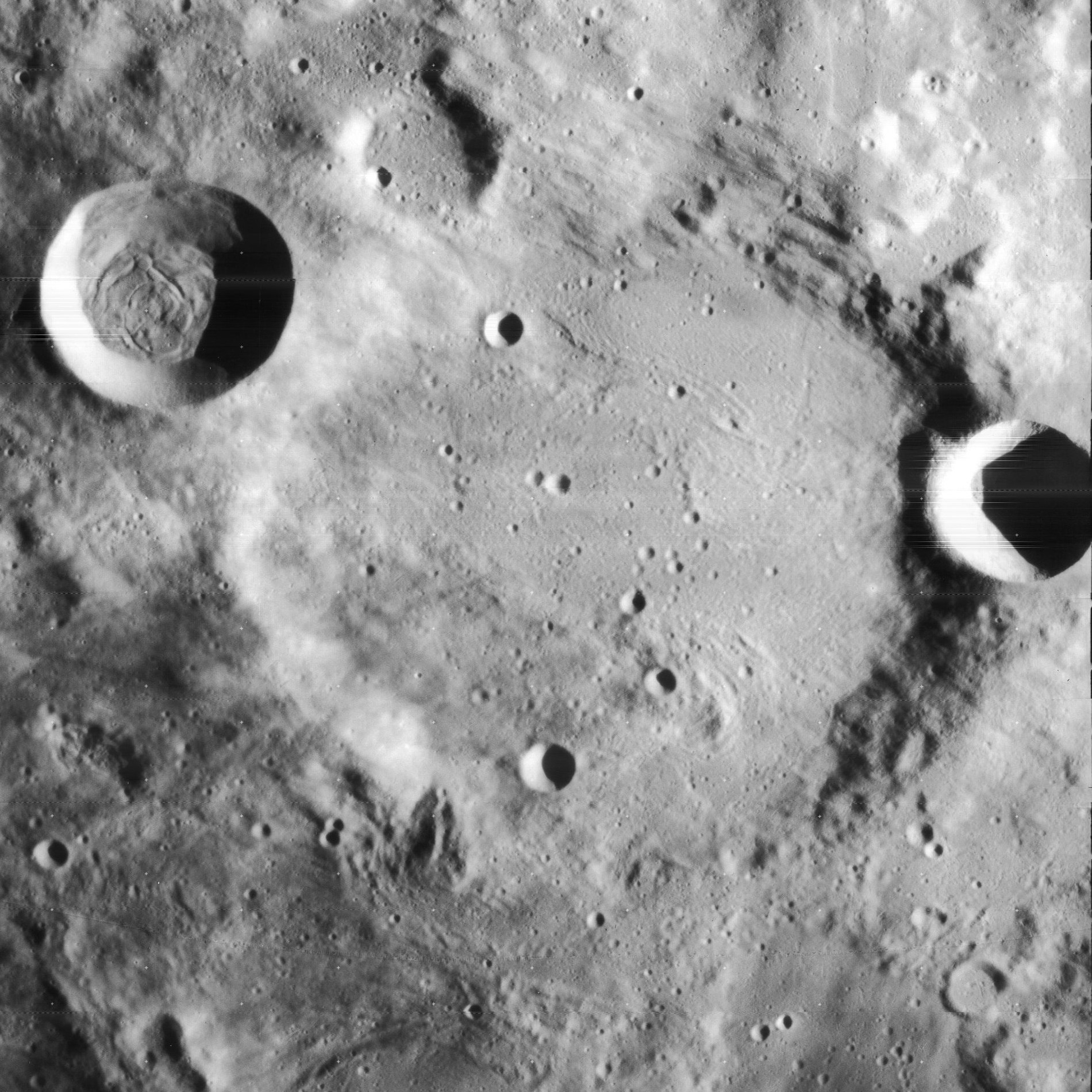
- Lunar Orbiter 4 image of Byrgius, with Byrgius A at right, and Byrgius D in upper left
- Location: The Moon
- Coordinates: 24.7°S 65.3°W
- Diameter: 84.46 km (52.48 mi)
- Depth: 4.6 km (2.9 mi)
- Age: c. 48 million years
- Eponym: Joost Burgi

Byrgius is a lunar impact crater located in the western part of The Moon, near the limb. As a result, Byrgius appears strongly oval in shape due to foreshortening. It lies northwest of Vieta. To the northwest is the nearly ruined crater Lamarck.

The low rim of Byrgius is worn and eroded, with Byrgius A overlying the eastern rim and Byrgius D lying across the northwest. The floor of Byrgius is relatively flat and undistinguished by significant craters. The high albedo bowl-shaped crater Byrgius A possesses its own ray system that crosses Byrgius, and extends for over 300 kilometres. This fresh crater has an estimated age of around 48 million years. Bright Byrgius A is an eye catcher during and after full moon. Its brightness and pronounced ray system are also noticeable on the photographic version of chart LAC 92 (page 184) in The Clementine Atlas of the Moon (Ben Bussey / Paul D. Spudis).

This crater is named after Swiss horologist Jost Burgi. His name was introduced into lunar nomenclature in 1651 by Giovanni Ricciolli. The designation was formally adopted by the International Astronomical Union in 1651.

== Satellite craters ==
By convention these features are identified on lunar maps by placing the letter on the side of the crater midpoint that is closest to Byrgius.

Byrgius	Latitude	Longitude	Diameter
A	24.5° S	63.7° W	19 km
B	23.9° S	60.8° W	23 km
D	24.1° S	67.1° W	27 km
E	23.5° S	66.2° W	18 km
H	23.7° S	62.4° W	27 km
K	23.0° S	61.8° W	14 km
N	22.3° S	63.1° W	20 km
P	22.6° S	64.1° W	19 km
R	26.5° S	60.7° W	7 km
S	26.2° S	61.4° W	43 km
T	25.1° S	61.5° W	5 km
U	25.8° S	67.2° W	13 km
V	26.0° S	67.8° W	9 km
W	26.1° S	68.5° W	14 km
X	25.7° S	65.4° W	6 km

Bright bowl-shaped crater Byrgius A was called La Paz by Hugh Percy Wilkins and Patrick Moore. This name was not accepted by the International Astronomical Union (IAU). It is a fresh impact that is less than 150 million years old, and so dates to the Copernican period of the lunar geologic timescale.

== Gallery ==
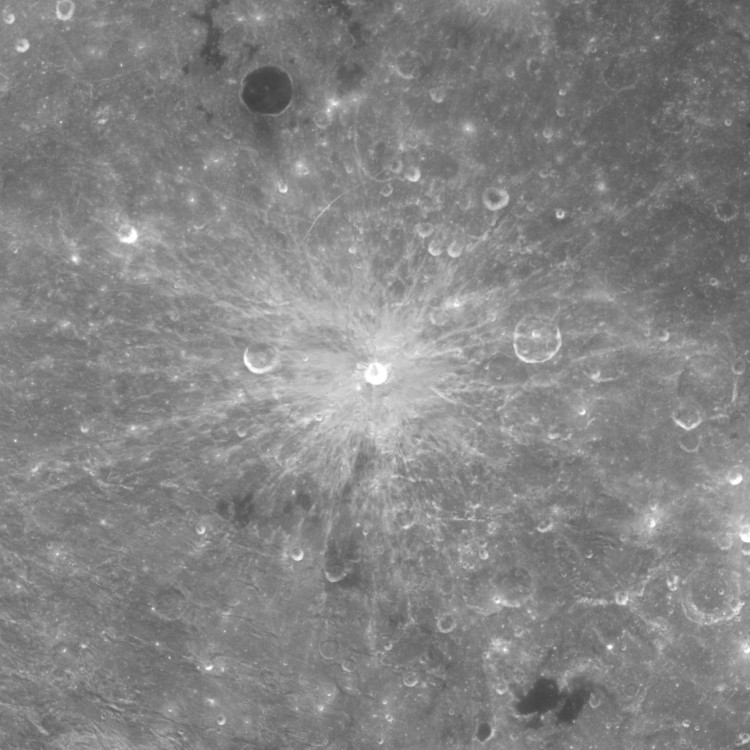
The rays of Byrgius A extend for hundreds of km, and it is the brightest feature in the region.

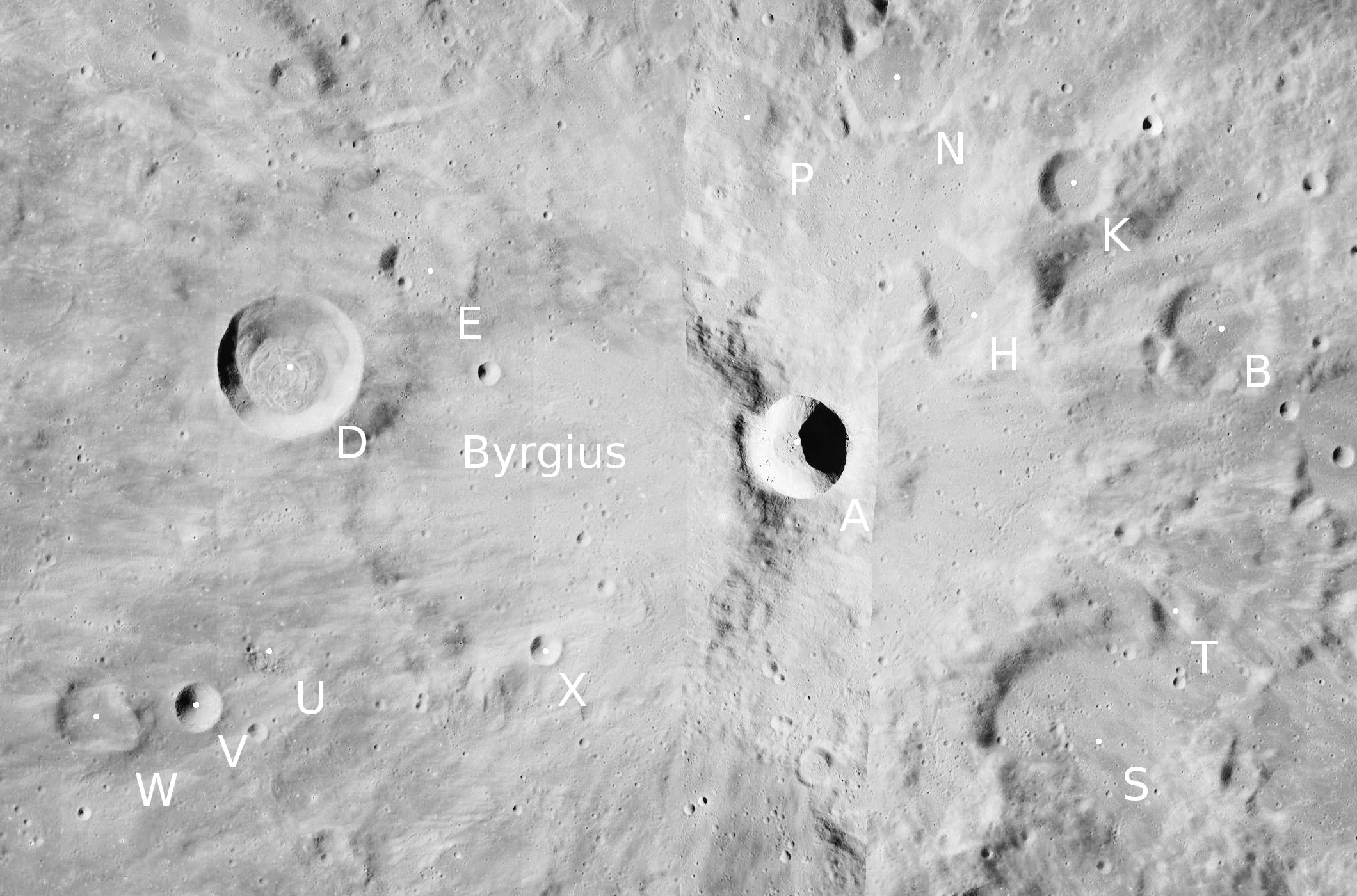
