= Crüger (crater) =

Crater on the Moon

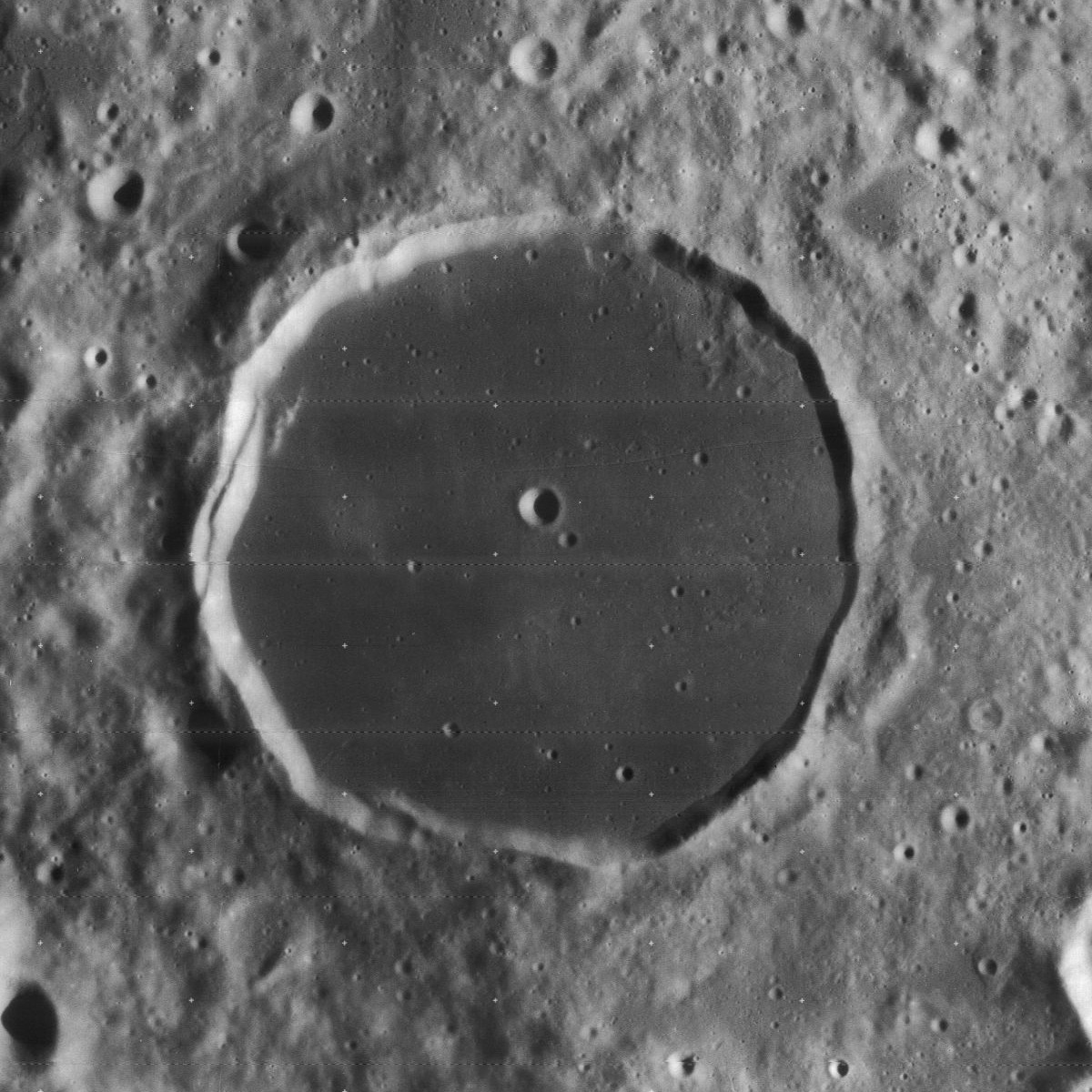
- Lunar Orbiter 4 image
- Coordinates: 16.7°S 66.8°W
- Diameter: 45 km
- Depth: 0.5 km
- Colongitude: 67° at sunrise
- Formation: Lower Imbrian
- Eponym: Peter Crüger

Crüger is a lunar impact crater that is located in the western part of the Moon, among the lunar highlands to the southwest of Oceanus Procellarum. It lies to the northeast of the much larger walled plain called Darwin. Just to the northwest of Crüger is a small mare named Lacus Aestatis.

The Crüger formation dates to the Lower (Early) Imbrian period on the lunar geologic timescale. It is located within a larger but less distinct impact feature that has a diameter of 120 km (75 mi). The most distinctive aspect of Crüger is a very dark interior floor that is one of the lowest albedo features on the Moon. In that aspect, it is similar to Plato crater, although half its size.

This crater formed prior to the Mare Orientale basin impact to the west, and the inner surface of Crüger was later flooded in basaltic lava. The explosive source vents were subsequently covered, and since then the surface has only been exposed to a minimal amount of deposition from impact ejecta. The floor is nearly featureless, with a tiny crater of 2.5 km (1.6 mi) diameter near the center and few other even more diminutive impacts. The outer rim is low and nearly circular, and has not been significantly reshaped by impacts.

This formation is named after German mathematician Peter Crüger (1580-1639). His name was originally included as 'Crugerus' in the lunar nomenclature of Giovanni B. Riccioli in 1651. Its modern designation was formally adopted by the International Astronomical Union in 1935.

== Satellite craters ==
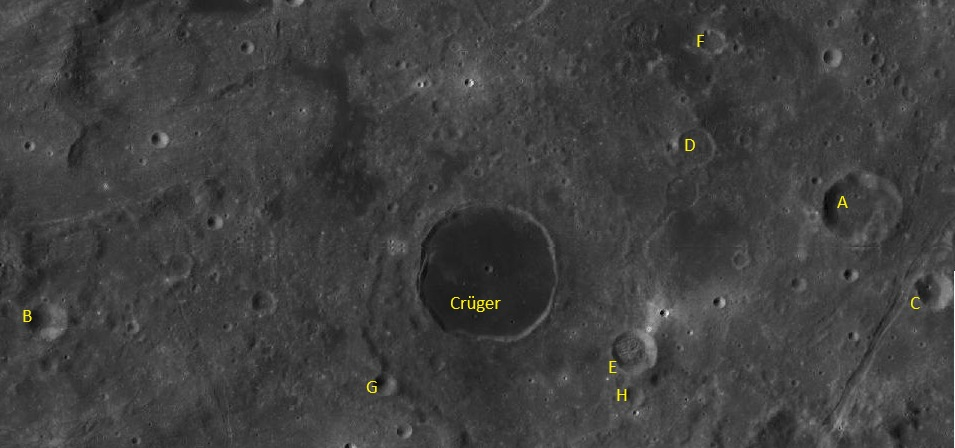
Satellite features of Crüger

By convention these features are identified on lunar maps by placing the letter on the side of the crater midpoint that is closest to Crüger.

Crüger	Latitude	Longitude	Diameter
A	16.0° S	62.7° W	27 km
B	17.2° S	71.6° W	13 km
C	16.8° S	61.9° W	12 km
D	15.3° S	64.5° W	12 km
E	17.5° S	65.2° W	16 km
F	14.2° S	64.4° W	9 km
G	17.9° S	68.0° W	8 km
H	18.0° S	65.2° W	7 km
