= Darwin (lunar crater) =

Crater on the Moon

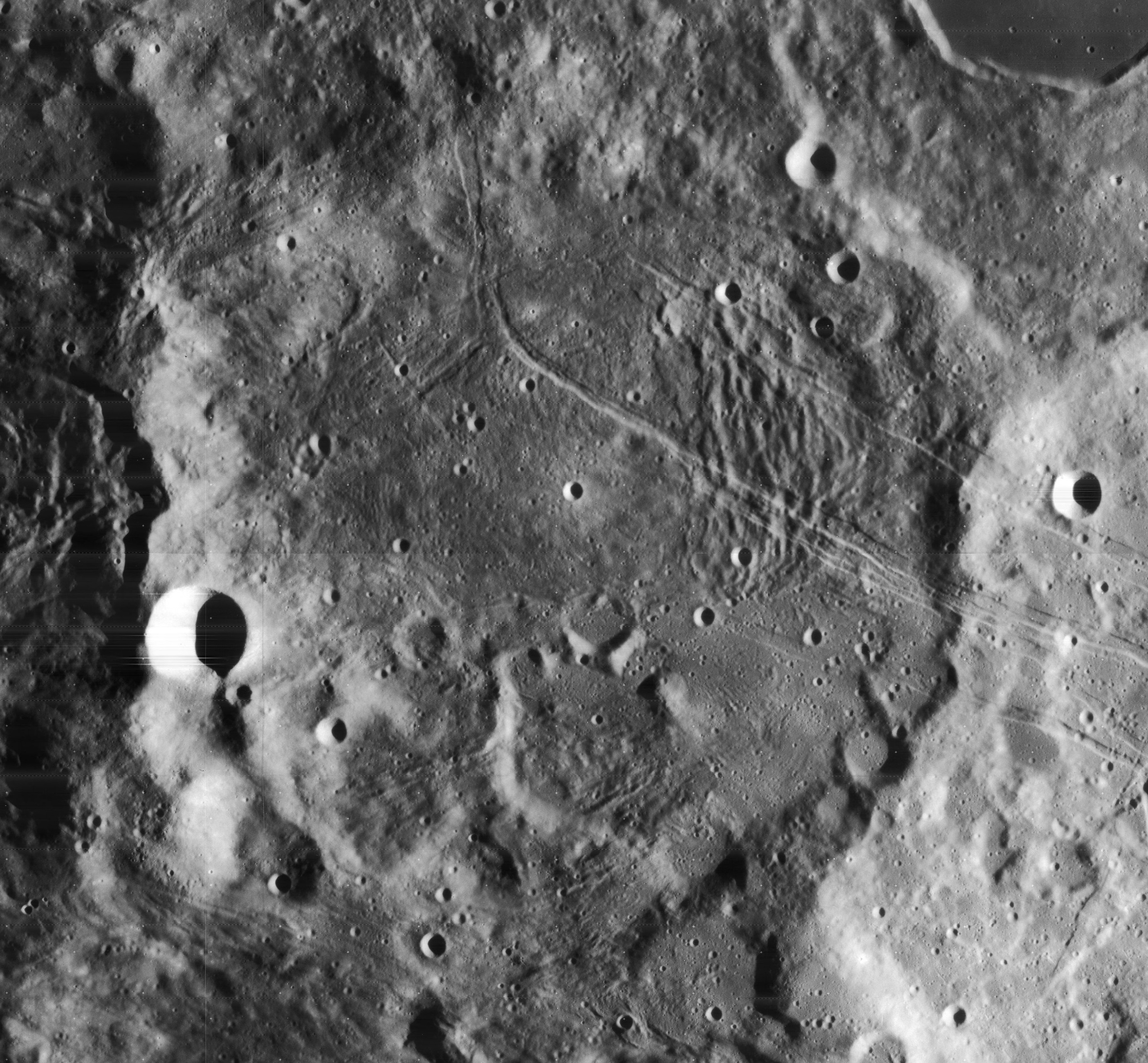
- Lunar Orbiter 4 image
- Coordinates: 19.8°S 69.1°W
- Diameter: 122.18 km (75.92 mi)
- Depth: Unknown
- Colongitude: 70° at sunrise
- Eponym: Charles R. Darwin

Darwin is a complex lunar impact crater of the type categorised as a walled plain. It lies in the southeastern part of the Moon, and is sufficiently close to the limb to appear significantly foreshortened when viewed from the Earth. Attached to its southern rim is the degraded formation Lamarck. Just to the north-northeast is the dark-floored crater Crüger, while the small crater De Vico lies to the east.

This formation is named after British natural scientist Charles Darwin (1809-1882), who is renowned for his contributions to evolutionary biology. His name was included in the lunar nomenclature of German astronomer Johann F. J. Schmidt during the 19th century. Its designation was formally adopted by the International Astronomical Union in 1935.

== Description ==
The outer rim of this formation has been significantly disintegrated by the nearby impacts. The southern and northern parts of the rim in particular are all but destroyed. The eastern rim is somewhat worn but intact, and several small craters lie along the southwestern rim. The satellite crater Darwin B, a fairly large formation with a diameter of 56 kilometers, is attached to the outer western rim.

Parts of the interior floor of Darwin have been resurfaced. The southern floor of Darwin is only roughly level, with irregular surface features and several small craters. There is a dune-like set of hills in the northeast part of the floor, which is "decelerated surface-flow ejecta" from the Orientale basin impact that struck the eastern rim. In the western floor is a large, low, somewhat irregular dome, one of the few such features not found on a mare. This is the largest lunar dome on the Moon's near side. There is also the remnant of a small crater at the southern end of the floor.

A system of rilles cut across the northern part of the floor, crossing the eastern rim and continuing to the southeast. These rilles are designated the Rimae Darwin, and they stretch for a distance of about 280 kilometers with a width of 1–2 km. To the east of Darwin, this system of rilles crosses Rima Sirsalis, a wide rille that follows a line to the northeast.

== Satellite craters ==
By convention these features are identified on lunar maps by placing the letter on the side of the crater midpoint that is closest to Darwin.

Darwin	Latitude	Longitude	Diameter
A	21.8° S	73.0° W	24 km
B	19.9° S	72.2° W	56 km
C	20.5° S	71.0° W	16 km
F	21.0° S	71.0° W	18 km
G	21.5° S	70.7° W	17 km
H	21.0° S	68.8° W	30 km
