= Coriolis =

Coriolis may refer to:

- Gaspard-Gustave de Coriolis (1792–1843), French mathematician, mechanical engineer and scientist
- Coriolis force, the apparent deflection of moving objects from a straight path when viewed from a rotating frame of reference
- Coriolis (crater), a lunar crater
- Coriolis (project), a French operational oceanographic project
- Coriolis (satellite), an American Earth and space observation satellite launched in 2003
- Coriolis effect (perception)
