= Stein (lunar crater) =

Crater on the Moon

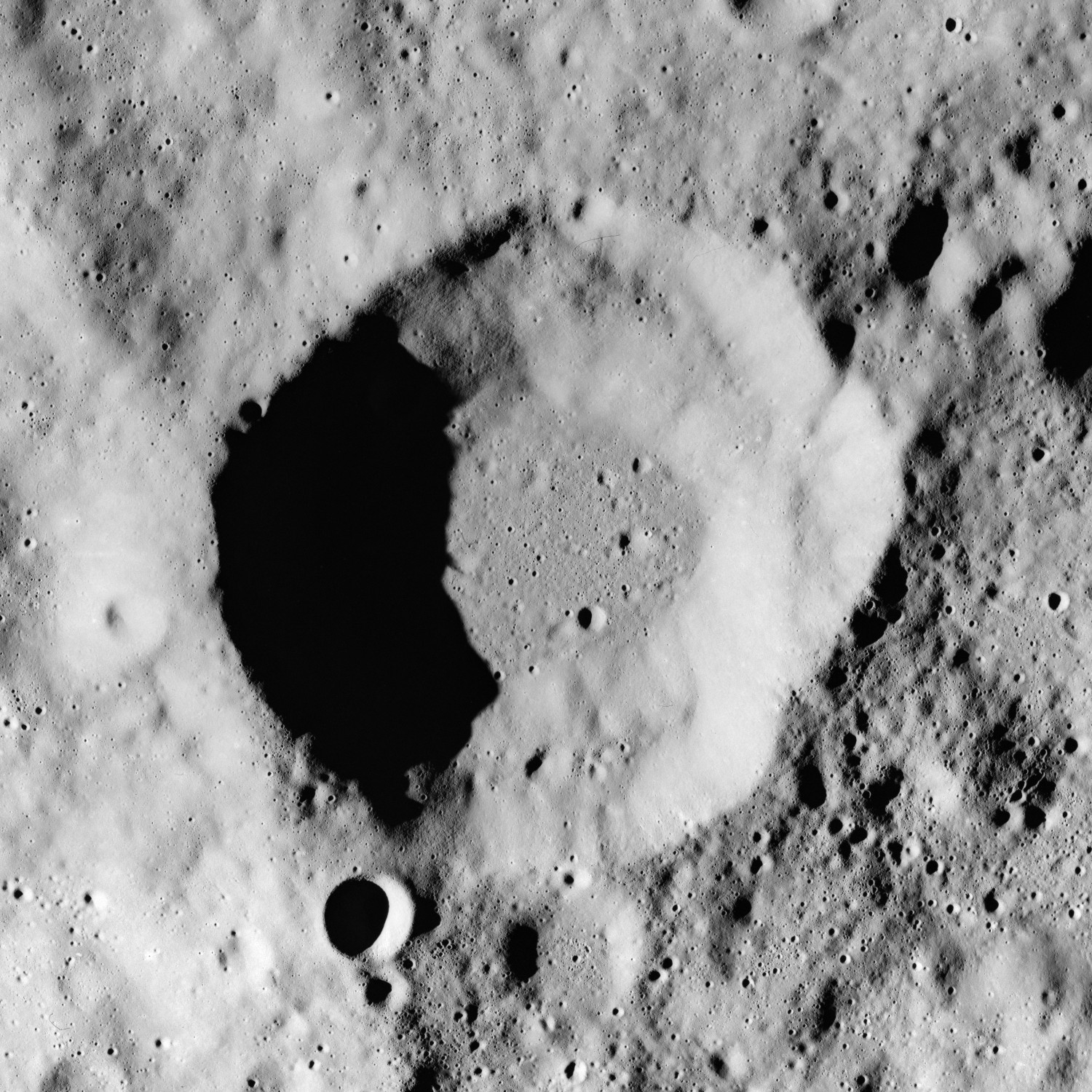
- Apollo 16 image
- Coordinates: 7.2°N 179.0°E
- Diameter: 33 km
- Depth: Unknown
- Colongitude: 179° at sunrise
- Eponym: Johan W. J. A. Stein

Stein is an elongated impact crater formation that lies just to the east of the larger crater Tiselius, on the far side of the Moon. Farther to the east-southeast of Stein lies Krasovskiy.

This crater has an asymmetrical shape with an outward bulge along the north-northeastern rim. The resulting crater is roughly egg-shaped, with a wide ledge along the north-northwestern floor. The remaining crater is a bowl-shaped feature with simple slopes along the inner walls and a nearly featureless interior floor. The outer rim has not been significantly eroded, and is marked only by a tiny craterlet along the southern edge. There are small craterlets along the base of the inner wall along the north-northwestern side.

== Satellite craters ==
By convention these features are identified on lunar maps by placing the letter on the side of the crater midpoint that is closest to Stein.

Stein	Latitude	Longitude	Diameter
C	8.9° N	178.8° W	27 km
K	5.2° N	180.0° W	20 km
L	4.6° N	179.8° W	15 km
M	3.8° N	178.8° E	28 km
N	2.2° N	178.5° E	16 km
