= Valier =

Valier may refer to:

Places

- Valier, Illinois, a village in the United States
- Valier, Montana, a town in the United States
- Villa Duodo, also known as "Villa Valier", in Veneto district, Italy
- Valier (crater), an impact crater on the Moon

People

- Bertuccio Valier (1596 – 1658), the 102nd Doge of Venice
- Silvestro Valier (1630 – 1700), the 109th Doge of Venice
- Max Valier (1895 – 1930), Austrian rocketry pioneer

Literature

- Valier (Middle-earth), female angelic or semi-divine beings in J. R. R. Tolkien's legendarium
