= Lyon Observatory =

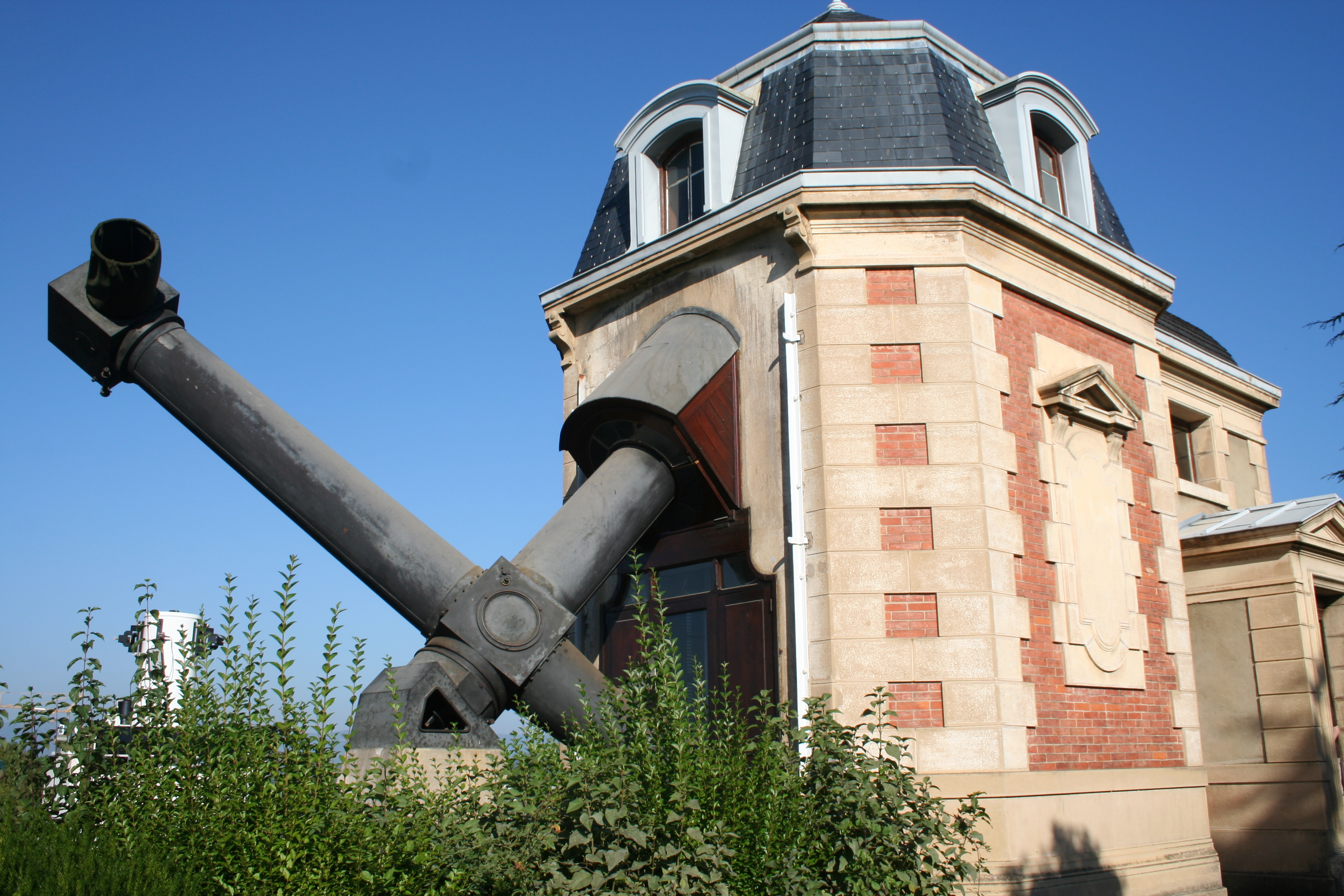
- Alternative names: OSUL
- Observatory code: 513
- Location: Saint-Genis-Laval, France
- Coordinates: 45°41′41″N 4°46′57″E
- Altitude: 266 m (873 ft)
- Established: 1878
- Website: observatoire.univ-lyon1.fr

Telescopes
- 1 m: Cassegrain
- 60 cm: Schmidt
- Related media on Commons

Lyon Observatory is an astronomical observatory located in Saint-Genis-Laval, a commune in the Rhône department in eastern France, near Lyon. Founded in 1878, the entire facility was listed as a historical site on 9 May 2007.

In 1867, Paris astronomer Charles André requested of the prefect of Rhone, that a new observatory be created. In 1873, a commission offered to establish a facility in Sainte-Foy-lès-Lyon. André sought to have the site built in Saint-Genis-Laval. On March 11, 1878, Patrice de MacMahon approved the creation of the Lyon Observatory. André was appointed its first director.

== Research ==
Lyon Observatory has worked on polychromatic artificial stars for adaptive optics systems, made by a laser.

== Directors ==
- 1878-1912: Charles André (1842-1912)
- 1912-1933: Jean Mascart (1872-1935)
- 1933-1966 : Jean Dufay (1896-1967)
- 1966-1976: Joseph-Henri Bigay (1910-1982)
- 1976-1986: Guy Monnet (1941-)
- 1986-1995: Jean-Claude Ribes (1940-)
- 1995-2005: Roland Bacon (1956-)
- 2005-2015: Bruno Guiderdoni
- 2015-... : Isabelle Daniel

== See also ==
- List of astronomical observatories
