= Marie Bloch =

French astronomer and astrophysicist

Marie Cecile Bloch
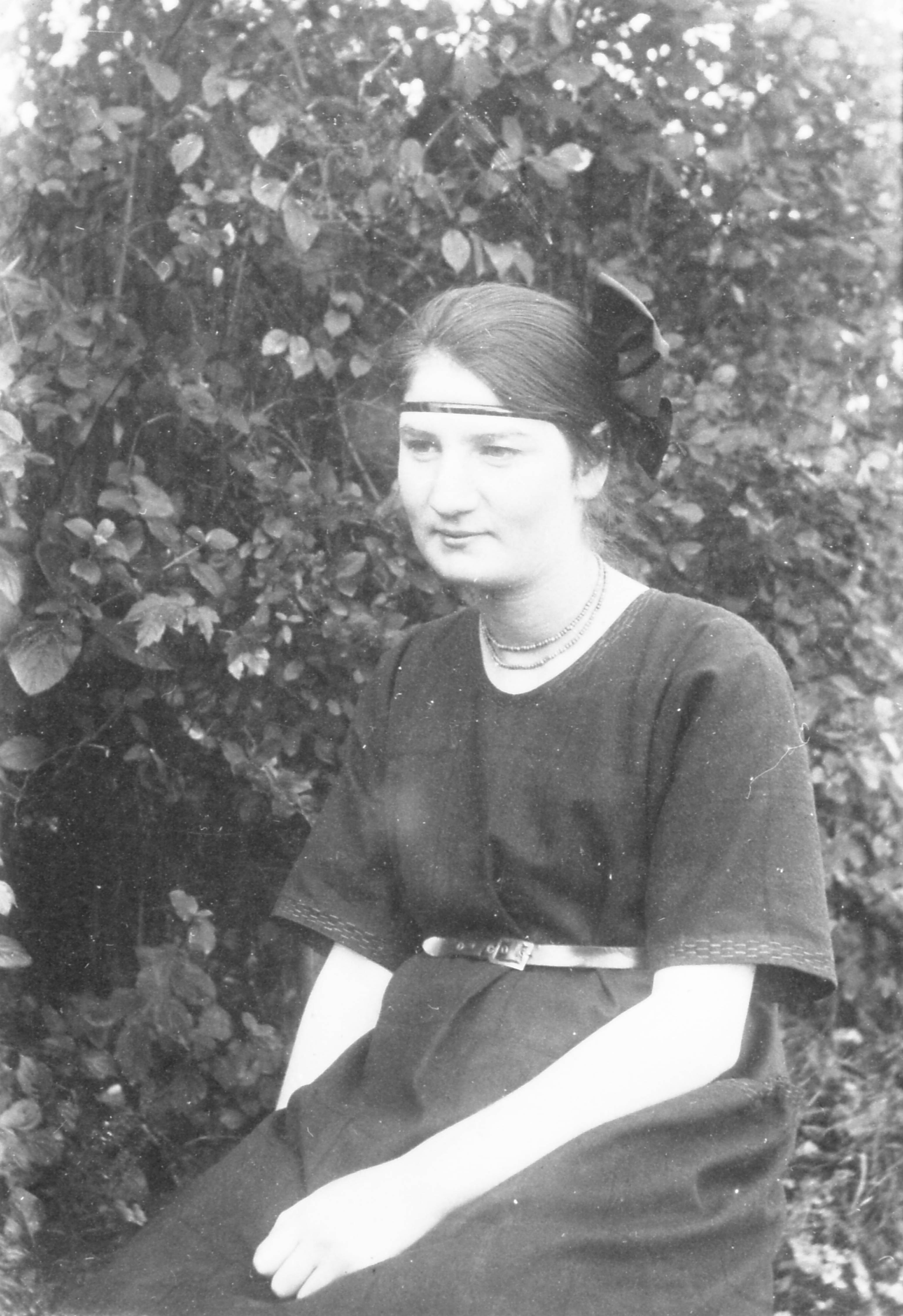
- Born: July 26, 1902; Lyon, France
- Died: August 1, 1979 (aged 77); Meyzieu, France
- Occupation: Astronomer
- Known for: Stellar spectroscopy
- Notable work: Spectroscopic studies of binary star systems

Marie Cecile Bloch (1902–1970) was a French astronomer and astrophysicist. She is noted for her work on stellar spectroscopy. She was awarded the Lalande Prize by the French Academy of Sciences in 1960 for her scientific work in this field.

== Biography ==
Bloch was born on 26 July 1902 in Lyon, France. She was born to a Jewish family of five children. Her father, Salomon Bloch, was a watchmaker who immigrated from Hégenheim, Switzerland. He was said to have been the guardian of Lyon's synagogue. The Blochs descended from a Jewish clan that settled in Alsace since the 17th century. Bloch's grandfather decided to move to Lyon when Alsace was occupied by the Germans after the French defeat during the Franco-Prussian War in 1871.

In 1918, Bloch obtained a scholarship to study at the Ecole Technique Municipale (the City Technical School), which was established by the then mayor of Lyon, E. Herriot. She graduated two years later. She obtained a certificate in General Mathematics from the Faculty of Sciences in 1932. She also completed Differential and Integral Calculus, Rational Mechanics, General Physics and Advanced Astronomy.

Bloch started working as an auxiliary staff at the Lyon Observatory. By 1925, she became the official user of the observatory's bent equatorial telescope. A year later, in October 1926, she was officially employed as an assistant astronomer under the leadership of Jean Dufay. During the Second World War, Bloch was forced to abandon her work for being Jewish. She spent years in hiding with the help of Maurice Durvis, who got her employed in a coal purchasing company. After the war, she resumed work at the observatory.

Bloch died on August 1, 1979, in Meyzieu.

=== Works ===
Bloch closely collaborated with Cheng Maolan (Tcheng Mao Lin in France) when the Chinese astronomer was living in France. During this collaboration on spectrophotometry of stars and the light of the sky at night, Bloch was described as one of the two young astronomers – the other was Charles Fehrenbach – who was observing at the Haute-Provence Observatory. Particularly, Bloch and Maolan studied the spectroscopic binary star system AX Persei, Z Andromedae, AG Pegasi, BF Cygni, CI Cygni, and T Coronae Borealis. Their works were able to determine the color temperature of the cool component of Z Andromedae in their spectroscopy of the variable star. They found it to be 5070K.

In 1960, the French Lalande Prize was awarded to Bloch in recognition of her scientific works.

=== Publications ===
- Bloch, Marie (Mlle) (1902). In France. Délégations générale à la recherche scientifique et technique. Répertoire des scientifiques français. t. 5. Physique. [Paris, La Documentation française] 1967. p 30. Q145.F7, v. 5
