= Valier (crater) =

Crater on the Moon

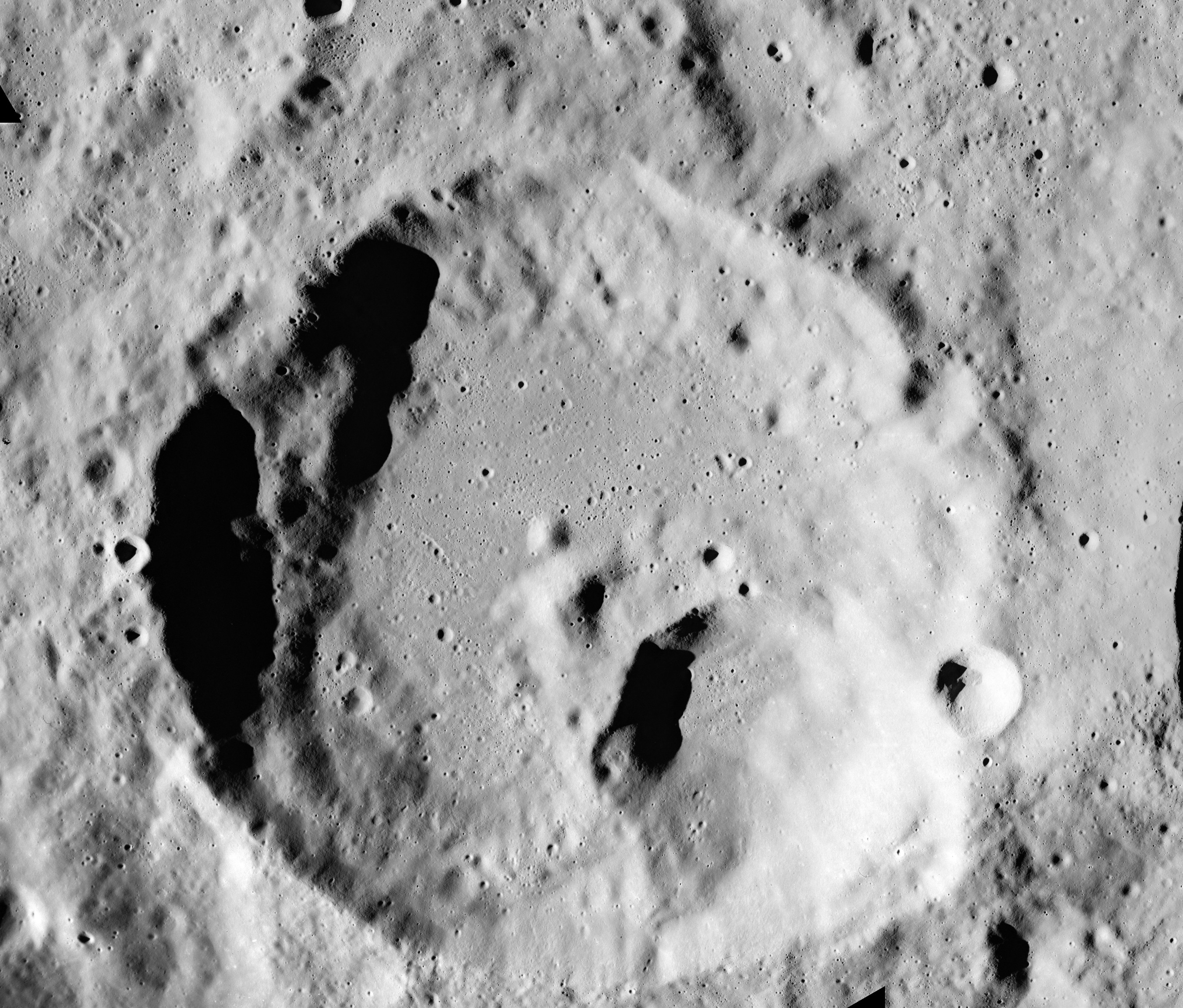
- Apollo 16 image
- Coordinates: 6.8°N 174.5°E
- Diameter: 67 km
- Depth: Unknown
- Colongitude: 174° at sunrise
- Eponym: Max Valier

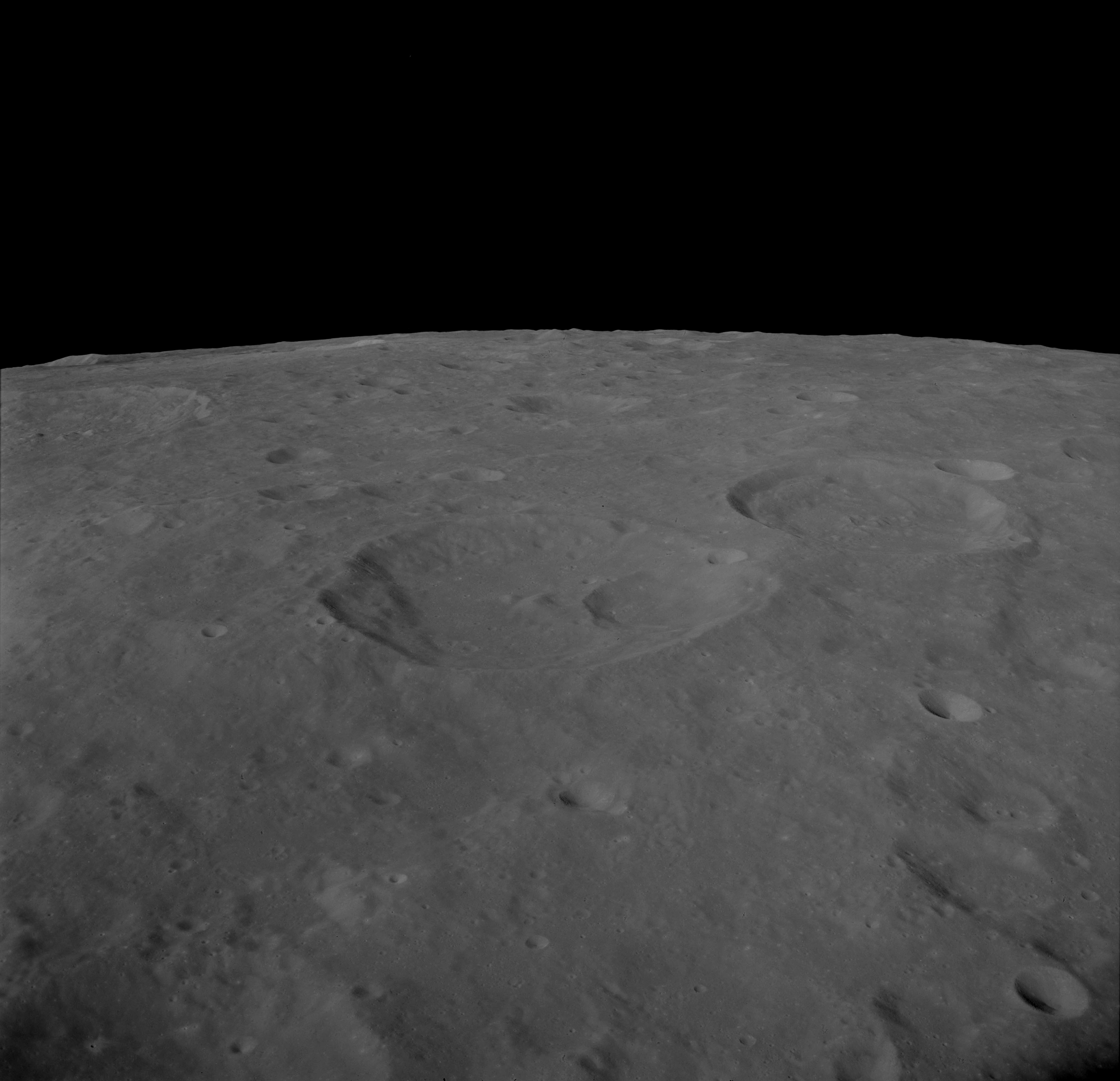
Oblique view from Apollo 10

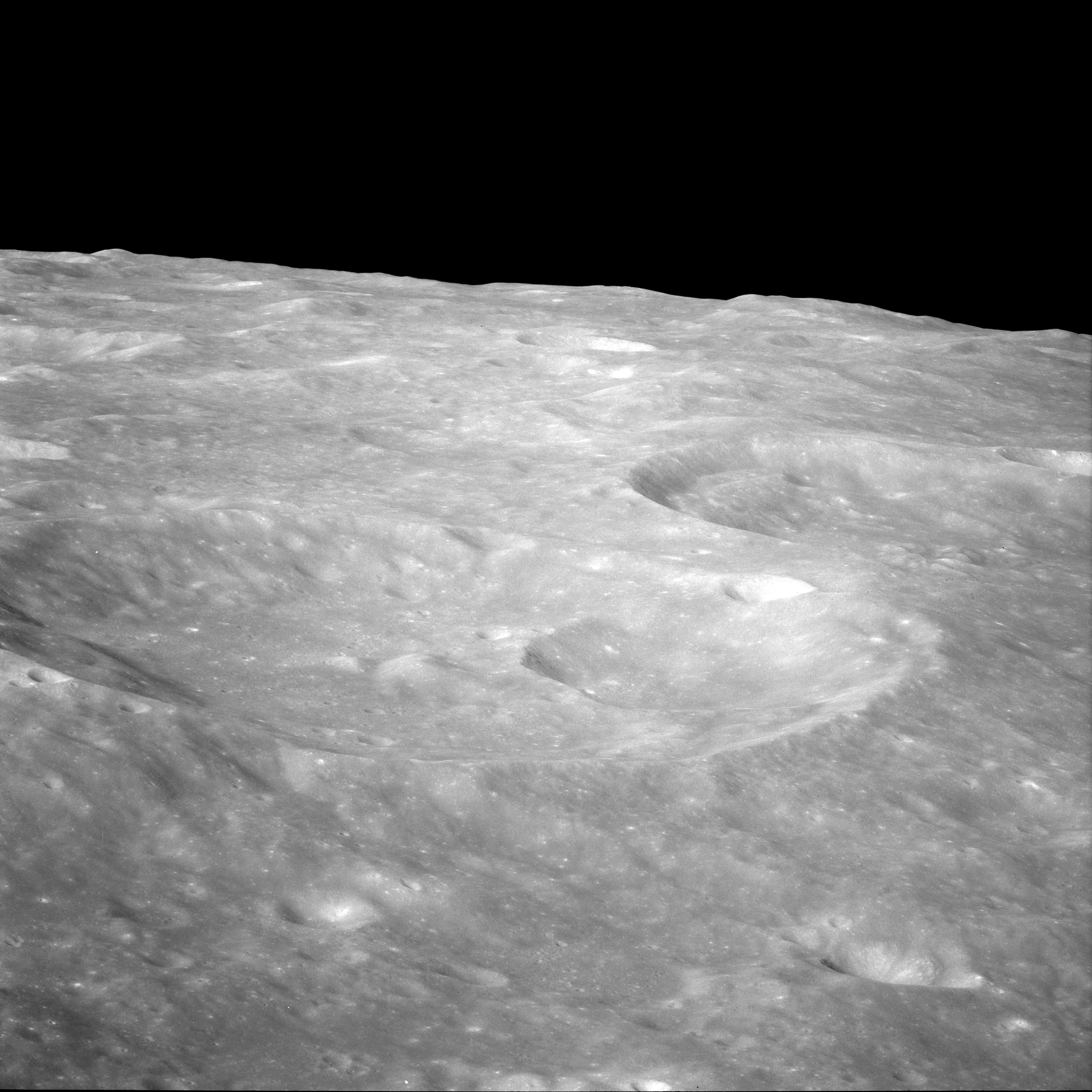
Oblique view from Apollo 11

Valier is a lunar impact crater that lies on the far side of the Moon. It is nearly attached to the western rim of the crater Tiselius. To the north-northwest lies the larger Sharonov, to the south-southwest is Coriolis, and west of Valier is Dufay.

The most notable feature of this crater is the satellite crater Valier J that occupies the southeastern part of the interior floor and shares part of the outer rim. The remainder of the rim is somewhat worn, with small craters along the eastern side. The inner walls of Valier are uneven slopes that are marked by several tiny craters. The surviving interior floor is a relatively level surface with some tiny craters scattered about.

== Satellite craters ==
By convention these features are identified on lunar maps by placing the letter on the side of the crater midpoint that is closest to Valier.

Valier	Latitude	Longitude	Diameter
J	6.3° N	174.9° E	26 km
P	4.8° N	173.3° E	8 km
