= Johan Stein =

Dutch Jesuit priest and astronomer (1871–1951)

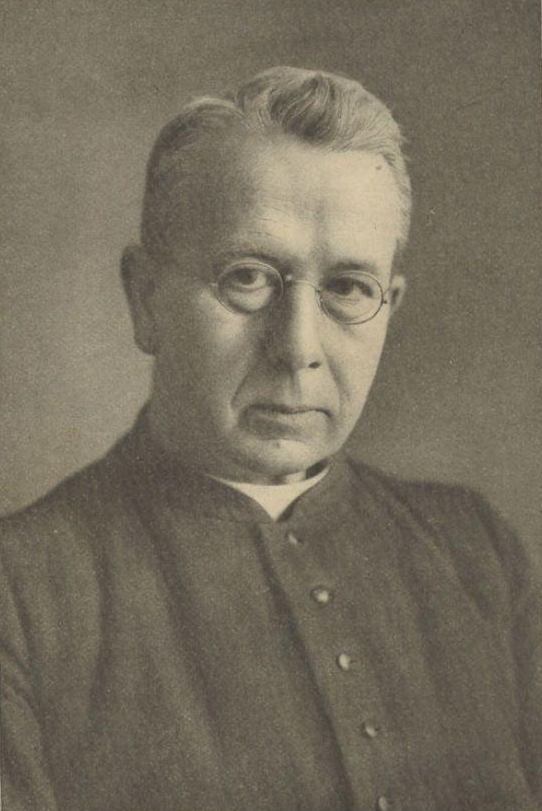
Johan Stein, c. 1930

Johan Willem Jakob Antoon Stein (27 February 1871–27 December 1951) was a Dutch astronomer and a member of the Society of Jesus.

He was born in Grave, Netherlands and spend his youth in Maastricht. In 1894 he finished a course of ecclesiastical philosophy, then studied astronomy at the University of Leyden. His doctoral dissertation was on the Horrebow method for determining latitude. By the time he received his doctorate in 1901, he had begun teaching physics and math at the St. Willebrord College of Katwijk. He was ordained to priesthood in Maastricht, 1903.

From 1906–1910 he served as an assistant at the Vatican Observatory. Thereafter he joined St. Ignatius College in Amsterdam, where he taught math and science for the next twenty years. In 1922 he became a member of the I.A.U. Commissions for Variable Stars. After 1924, he joined the Association of Dutch Amateur Astronomers. In 1930 he became director of the Vatican Observatory. He was responsible for the modernization of the observatory, as well as its relocation to Castel Gandolfo in 1933. He died in Rome, Italy.

Queen Juliana made him a knight of the Order of the Lion of the Netherlands. The crater Stein on the far side of the Moon is named after him.

== See also ==
- List of Roman Catholic scientist-clerics
