= Dufay (crater) =

Crater on the Moon

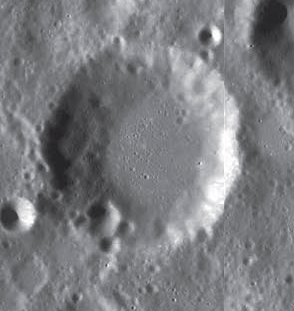
- LRO image
- Coordinates: 5.5°N 169.5°E
- Diameter: 36.11 km (22.44 mi)
- Depth: Unknown
- Colongitude: 191° at sunrise
- Eponym: Jean Dufay

Dufay is a lunar impact crater that is located on the far side of the Moon. It lies about one crater diameter to the east of the large walled plain Mandel'shtam. To the northwest is the crater Papaleksi and to the east is Valier.

The rim of this crater is heavily worn by impacts, and several small craterlets lie along the southern edge. The inner wall is somewhat wider on the western side when compared to the east and southeast. The interior floor is relatively level and featureless.

This formation is named after French astronomer Jean Claude Barthélemy Dufay (1896-1967). Its designation was formally dopted by the International Astronomical Union in 1970.

== Albedo anomaly ==
To the northeast of Dufay is a bright albedo anomaly that does not correlate with any topographic features. The lunar surface at the anomaly is not atypical under low sun angles. The albedo anomaly is associated with an enhancement in Thorium.

A bright patch to the west of Dufay displays a strong infrared absorption feature that is typically associated with hydroxyl and water. This may be the result of a thin layer of material deposited by an asteroid or comet.

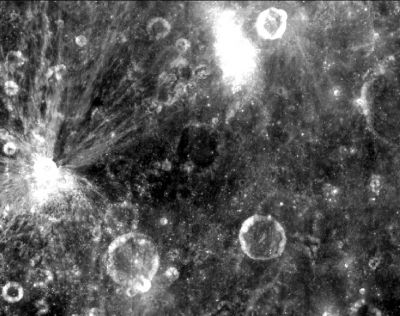
Dufay is at center, and the elongate white patch above right of center is the anomaly. The bright feature to the left is Mandel'shtam F crater and its ray system.

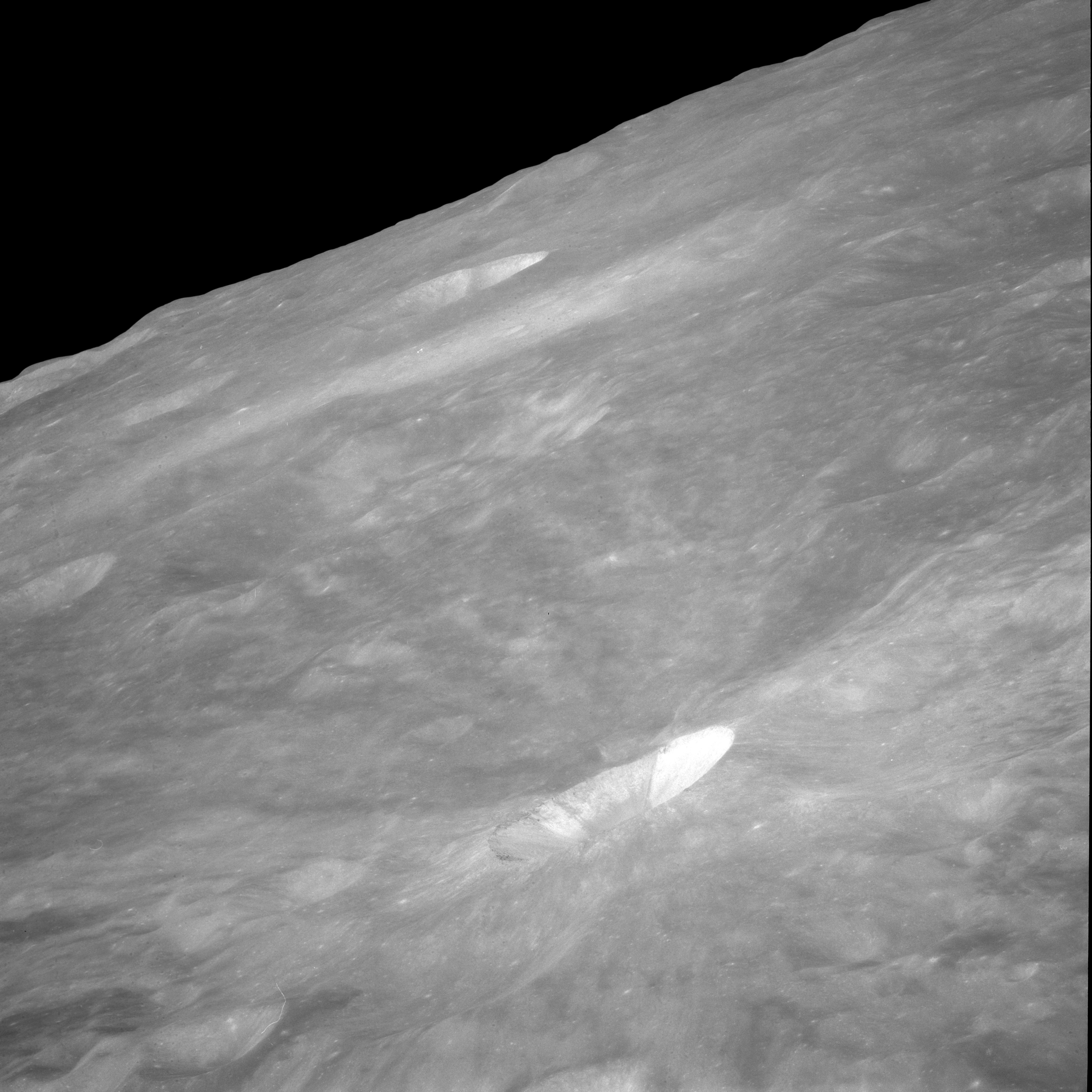
The albedo anomaly is visible above center in this view from Apollo 11

== Satellite craters ==
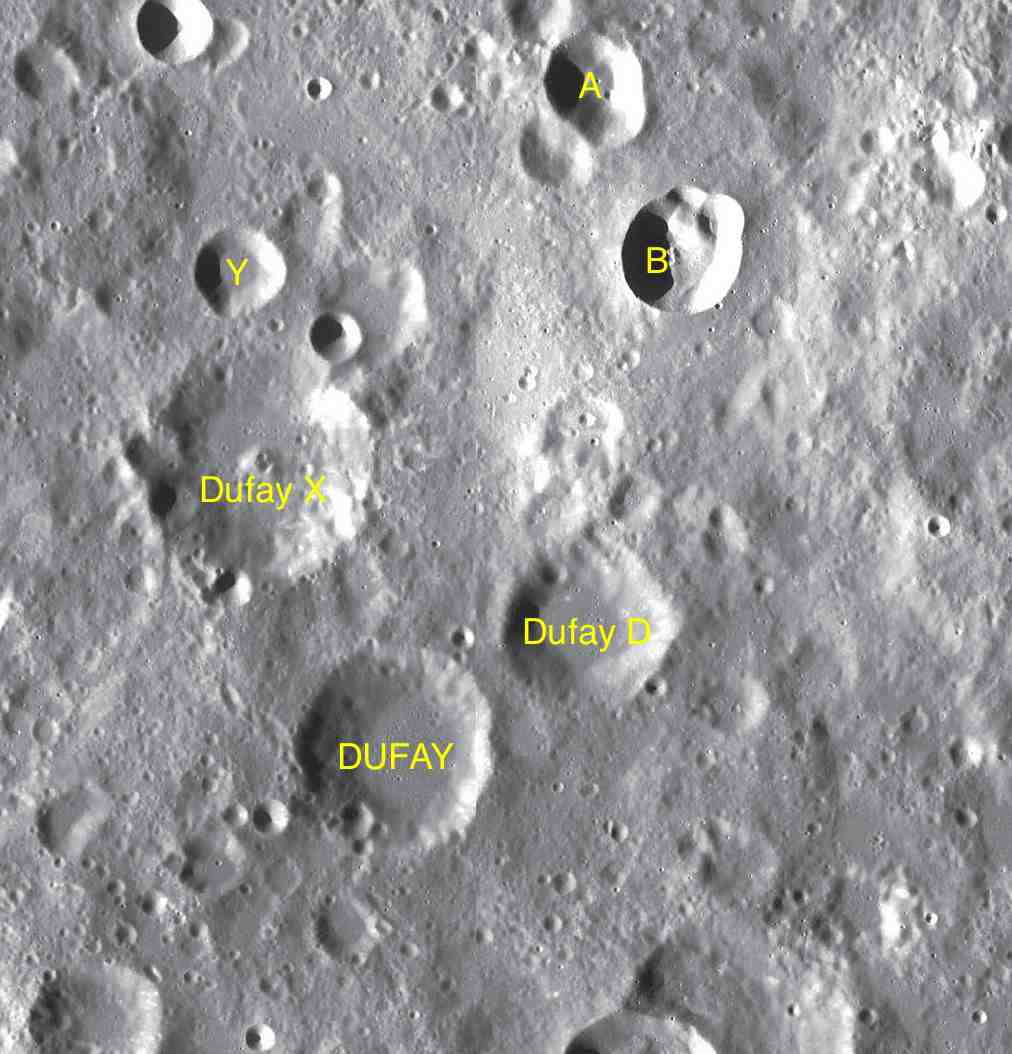
Map of satellite craters

By convention these features are identified on lunar maps by placing the letter on the side of the crater midpoint that is closest to Dufay.

Dufay	Latitude	Longitude	Diameter
A	9.5° N	170.5° E	15 km
B	8.5° N	171.0° E	20 km
D	6.3° N	170.5° E	32 km
X	7.2° N	168.5° E	42 km
Y	8.3° N	168.4° E	16 km

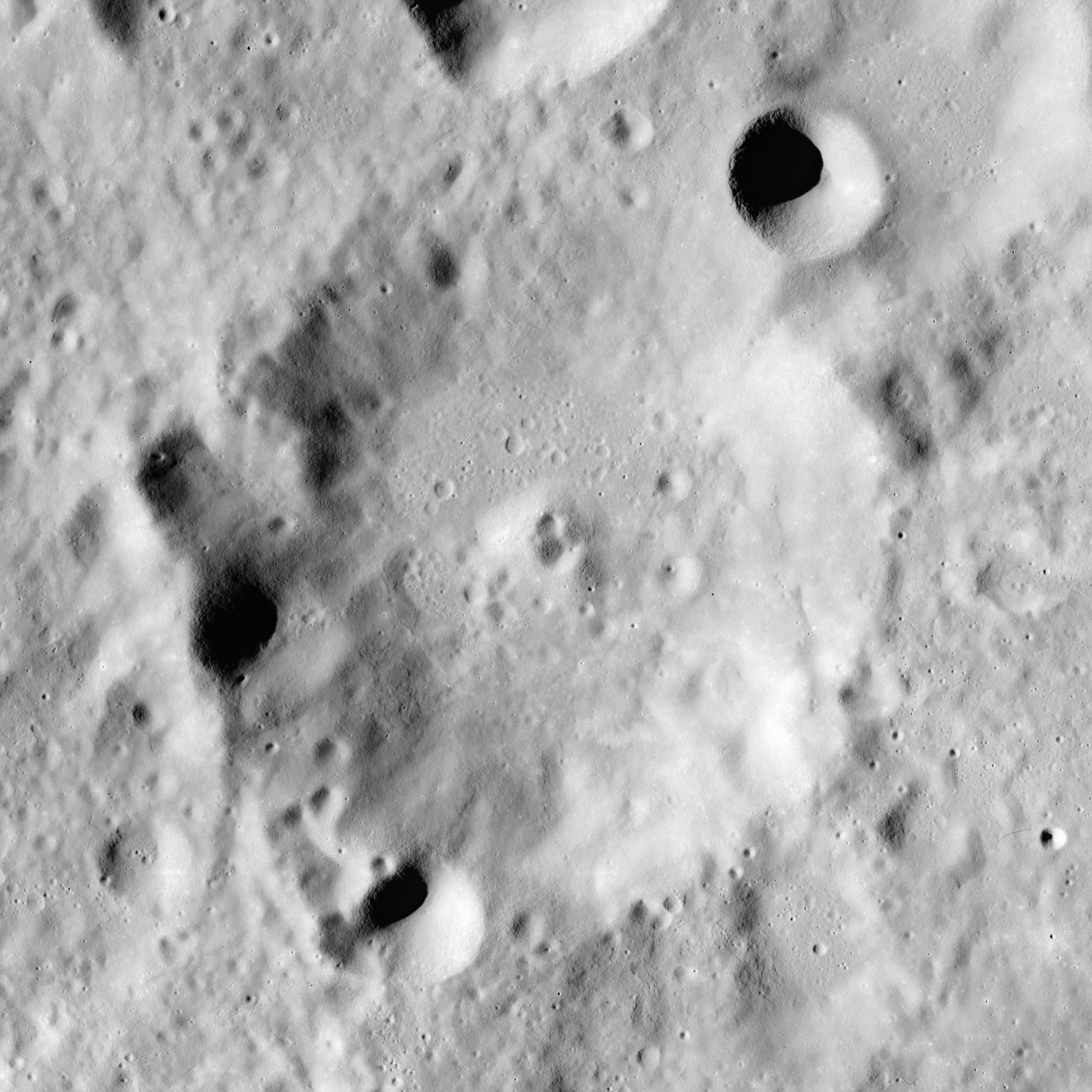
Dufay X crater
