= Jean Dufay =

French astronomer (1896–1967)

Jean Claude Barthélemy Dufay (French pronunciation: [ʒɑ̃ klod baʁtelemi dyfɛ]; July 18, 1896–November 6, 1967) was a French astronomer.

During his career he studied nebulae, interstellar matter, the night sky and cometary physics. In 1925, while working in collaboration with Jean Cabannes, he computed the altitude of the Earth's ozone layer. He was named the honorary director of the Lyon Observatory. Some of his proteges who worked with him in the observatory included Marie Bloch and Charles Fehrenbach. He became a member of the French Academy of Sciences in 1963.

His undergrad was completed in 1913 and his Ph.D. in 1928 under Charles Fabry and Jean Cabannes. In between, he served (and was wounded) in World War I and taught. Dufay was appointed to the Lyon Observatory in 1929 and stayed there until his retirement in 1966.

He was awarded the Valz Prize by the French Academy of Sciences in 1932 for his work on astronomical photometry. In 1963, he was awarded the Prix Jules Janssen by the Société astronomique de France. The crater Dufay on the Moon is named after him.

== Bibliography ==
- Dufay, Jean. Nébuleuses galactiques et matière interstellaire (Albin Michel, 1957).
- Dufay, Jean. Introduction à l'astrophysique. Les étoiles (Armand Colin, 1961).
