= Krasovskiy (crater) =

Crater on the Moon

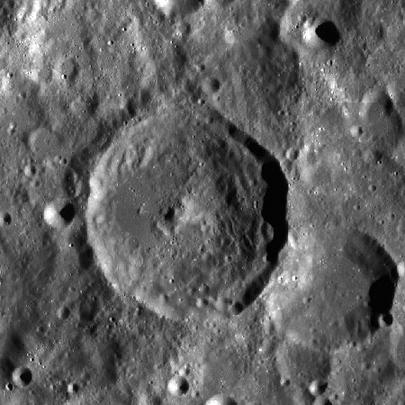
- LRO image
- Coordinates: 3.9°N 175.5°W
- Diameter: 59 km
- Depth: Unknown
- Colongitude: 176° at sunrise
- Eponym: Feodosiy N. Krasovskiy

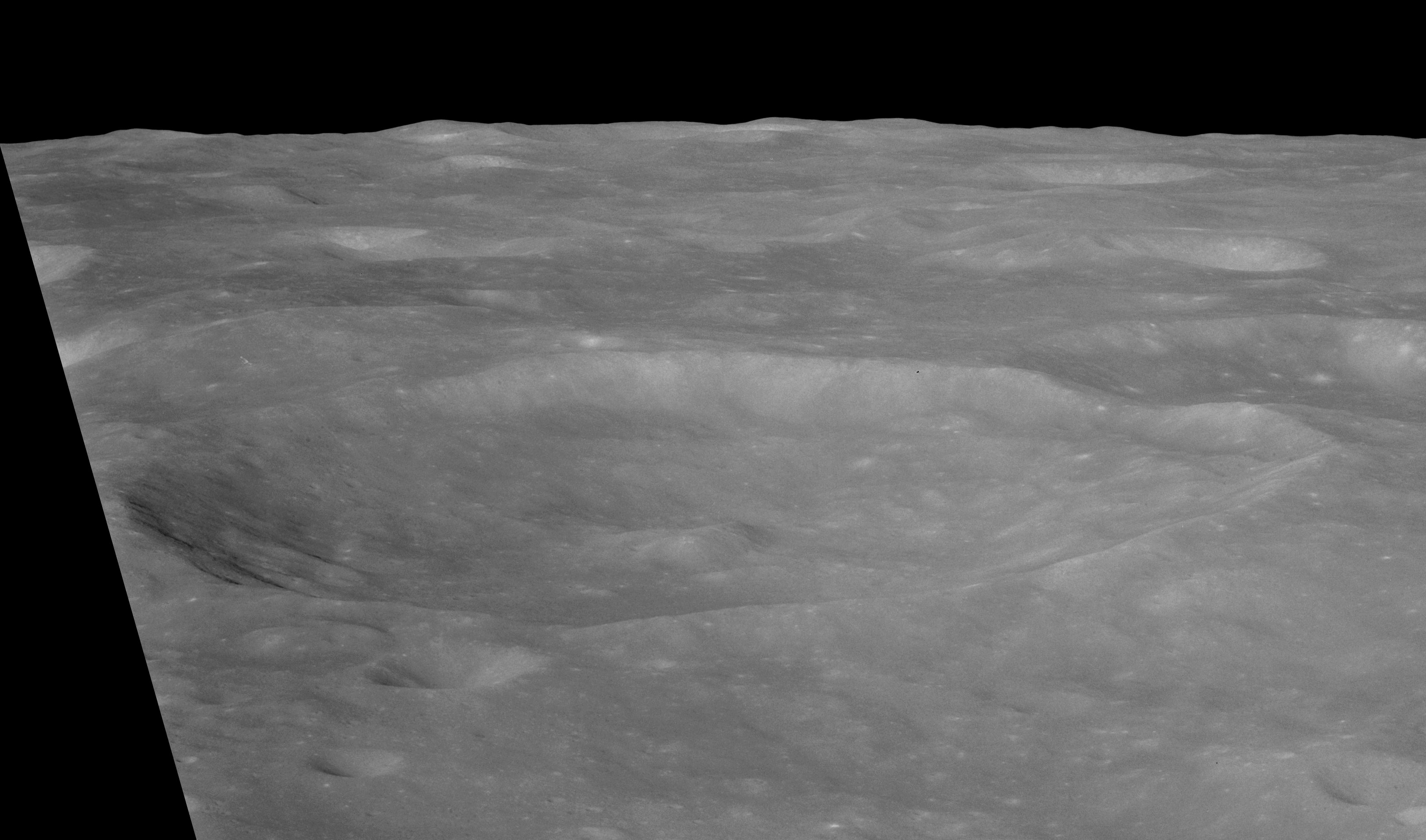
Apollo 11 image

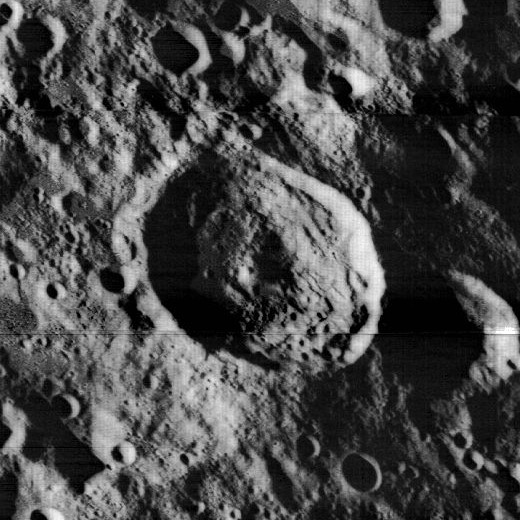
Lunar Orbiter 2 image

Krasovsky is an impact crater on the far side of the Moon. It is located about three crater diameters to the north-northwest of Daedalus. It is otherwise relatively isolated from impact craters of note, with the nearest comparable feature being Tiselius to the west-northwest.

The rim of this crater is relatively well-defined, and has not suffered significant impact erosion. Within the interior floor is a central peak that is offset slightly to the west of the midpoint. There are no notable craters along the rim or within the interior.

One of the faint extremities of the ray system belonging to Jackson passes less than half a crater diameter to the west of Krasovsky. The ray originates to the north-northeast.

== Satellite craters ==
By convention these features are identified on lunar maps by placing the letter on the side of the crater midpoint that is closest to Krasovskiy.

Krasovskiy	Latitude	Longitude	Diameter
C	6.1° N	173.6° W	23 km
F	3.7° N	172.5° W	15 km
H	2.7° N	171.4° W	46 km
J	3.2° N	174.1° W	32 km
L	0.4° S	174.8° W	58 km
N	1.0° N	176.0° W	22 km
P	0.8° N	177.3° W	41 km
T	3.6° N	177.1° W	100 km
Z	5.9° N	175.6° W	15 km

Views of satellite craters from Apollo 11:

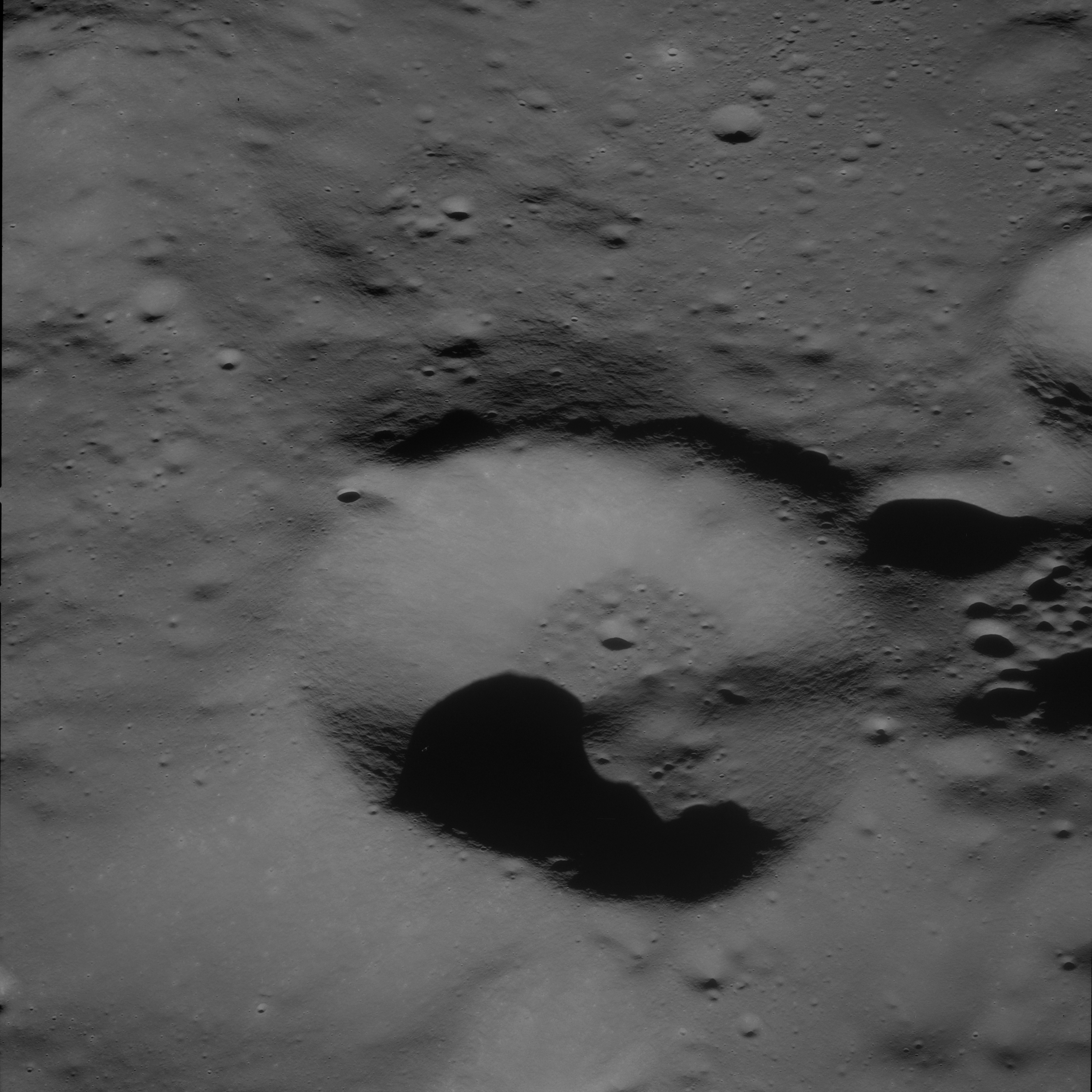
Krasovskiy L

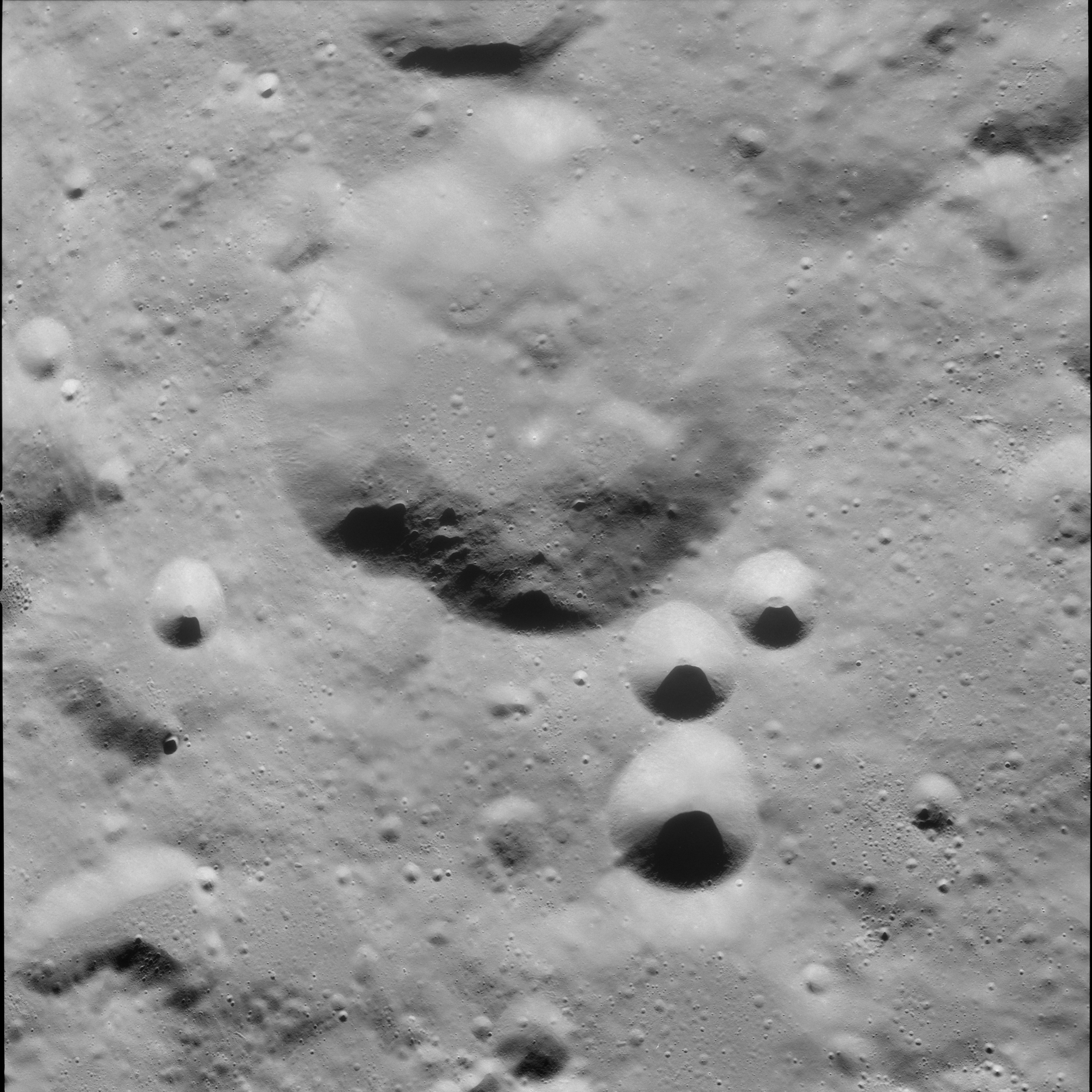
Krasovskiy P

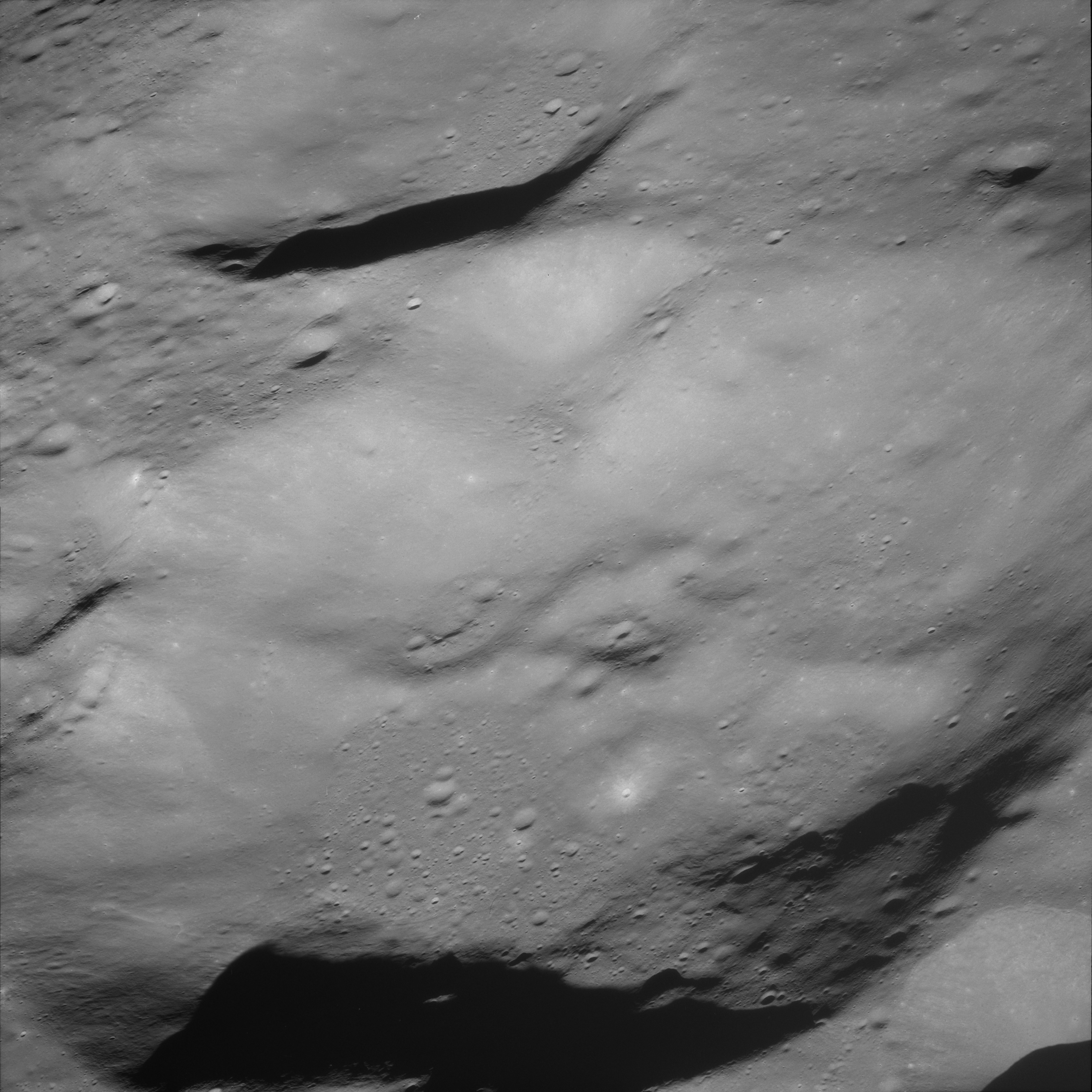
Krasovskiy P and N

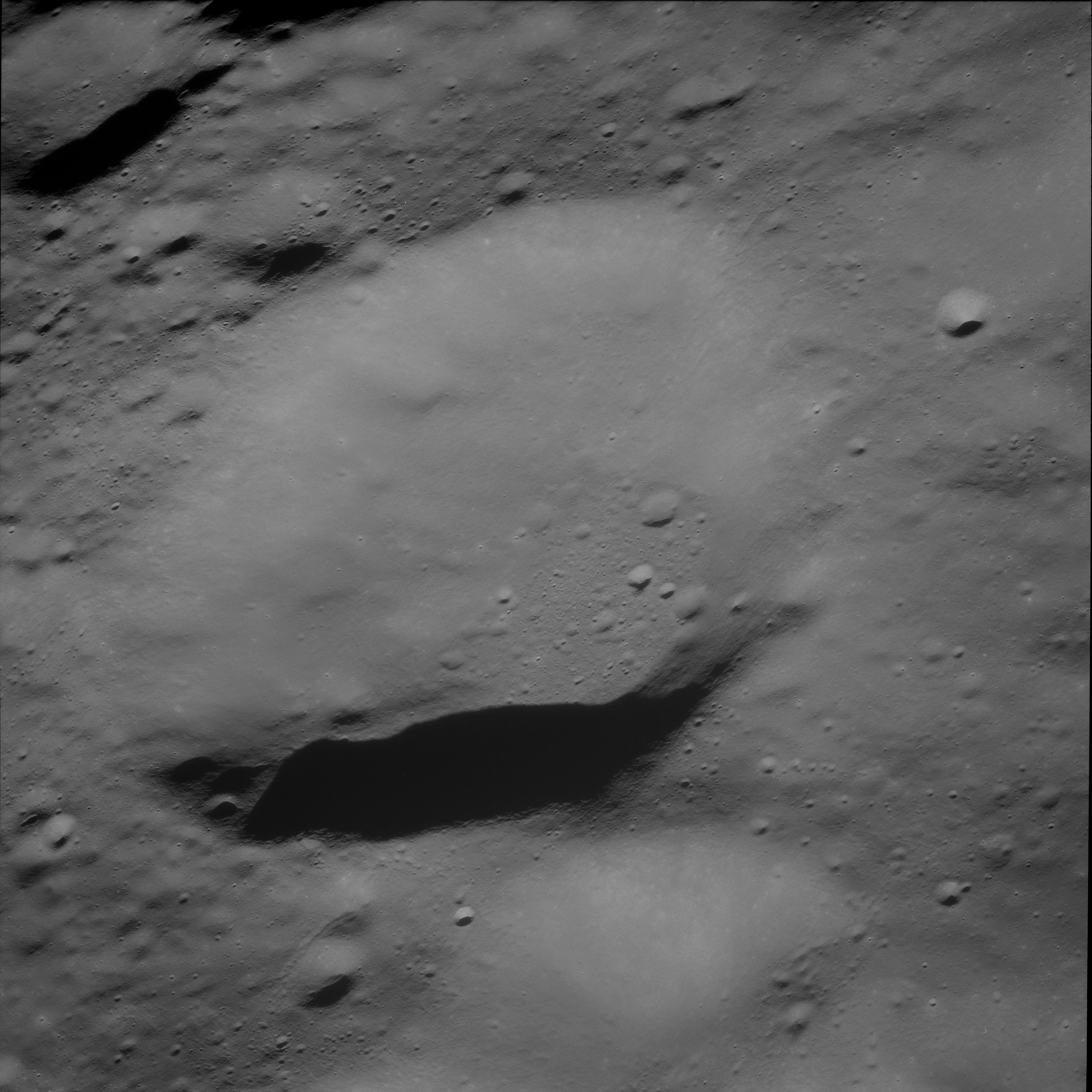
Krasovskiy N
