= Arne Tiselius =

Swedish biochemist and Nobel Prize laureate (1902–1971)

Arne Tiselius ForMemRS
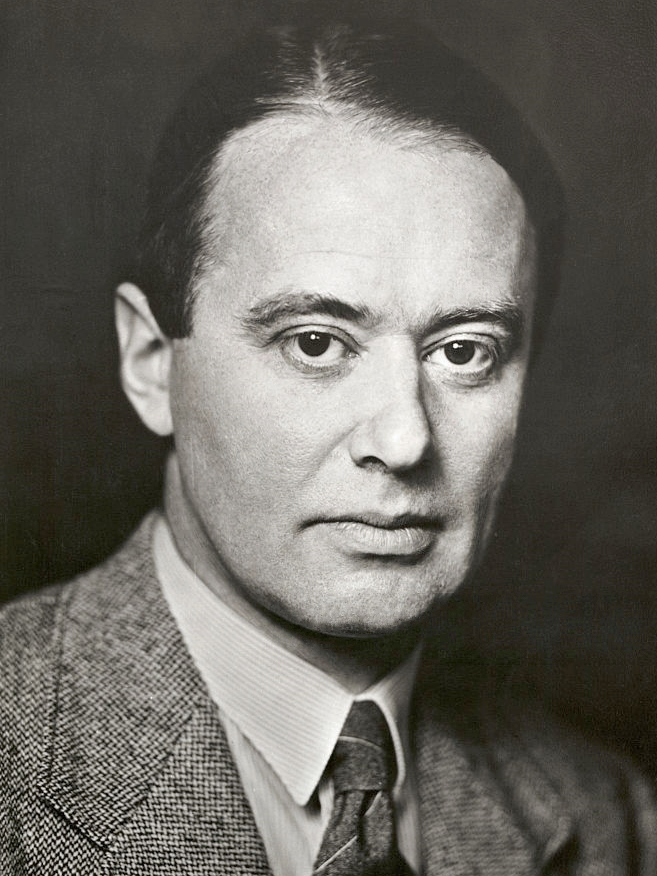
- Born: Arne Wilhelm Kaurin Tiselius; 10 August 1902; Stockholm, Sweden
- Died: 29 October 1971 (aged 69); Uppsala, Sweden
- Education: University of Uppsala
- Known for: Electrophoresis
- Spouse: Ingrid Margareta Dahlén
- Awards: Björkénska priset (1940); Nobel Prize for Chemistry (1948); Centenary Prize (1953); Franklin Medal (1955)
- Scientific career
- Fields: Chemistry
- Workplaces: University of Uppsala

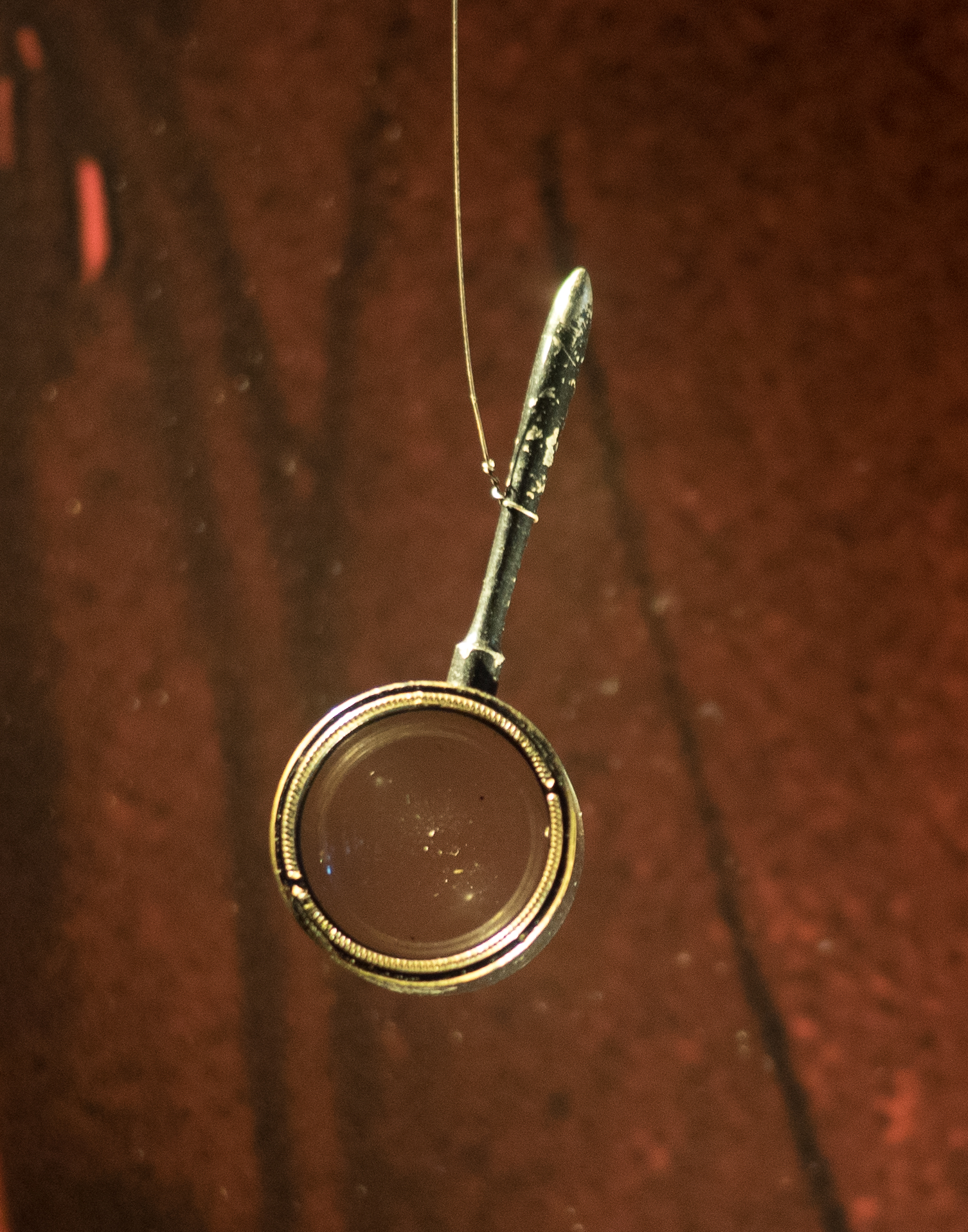
Tiselius' magnifying glass on display at the Nobel Prize Museum

Arne Wilhelm Kaurin Tiselius (10 August 1902 – 29 October 1971) was a Swedish biochemist who won the Nobel Prize in Chemistry in 1948 "for his research on electrophoresis and adsorption analysis, especially for his discoveries concerning the complex nature of the serum proteins."

== Education ==
Tiselius was born in Stockholm. Following the death of his father, the family moved to Gothenburg where he went to school, and after graduation at the local "Realgymnasium" in 1921, he studied at the Uppsala University, specializing in chemistry.

== Career and research ==
Tiselius became a research assistant at Theodor Svedberg's laboratory in 1925 and obtained his doctoral degree in 1930 on "The Moving Boundary Method of Studying the Electrophoresis of Proteins". From then to 1935 he published a number of papers on diffusion and adsorption in naturally occurring base-exchanging zeolites, and these studies continued during a year's visit to Hugh Stott Taylor's laboratory in Princeton University with support of a Rockefeller Foundation fellowship. On his return to Uppsala he resumed his interest in proteins, and the application of physical methods to biochemical problems. This led to a much-improved method of electrophoretic analysis which he refined in subsequent years.

Tiselius took an active part in the reorganization of scientific research in Sweden in the years following World War II, and was President of the International Union of Pure and Applied Chemistry 1951–1955. He was chairman of the board for the Nobel Foundation from 1960 to 1964.

== Awards and honours ==
- 1948 Nobel Prize for Chemistry
- 1949 Elected a Foreign Associate of the National Academy of Sciences
- 1953 Elected to the American Academy of Arts and Sciences
- 1957 Elected a Foreign Member of the Royal Society (ForMemRS).
- 1961 Paul Karrer Gold Medal
- 1964 Elected to the American Philosophical Society

The lunar crater Tiselius was named in his honour.

== Personal life ==
Tiselius was married, with two children. He died of a heart attack 29 October 1971 in Uppsala.

Non-profit organization positions
Preceded by Birger Ekeberg	Chairman of the Nobel Foundation; 1960–1964	Succeeded by Bertil Lindblad
