= Tiselius =

Crater on the Moon

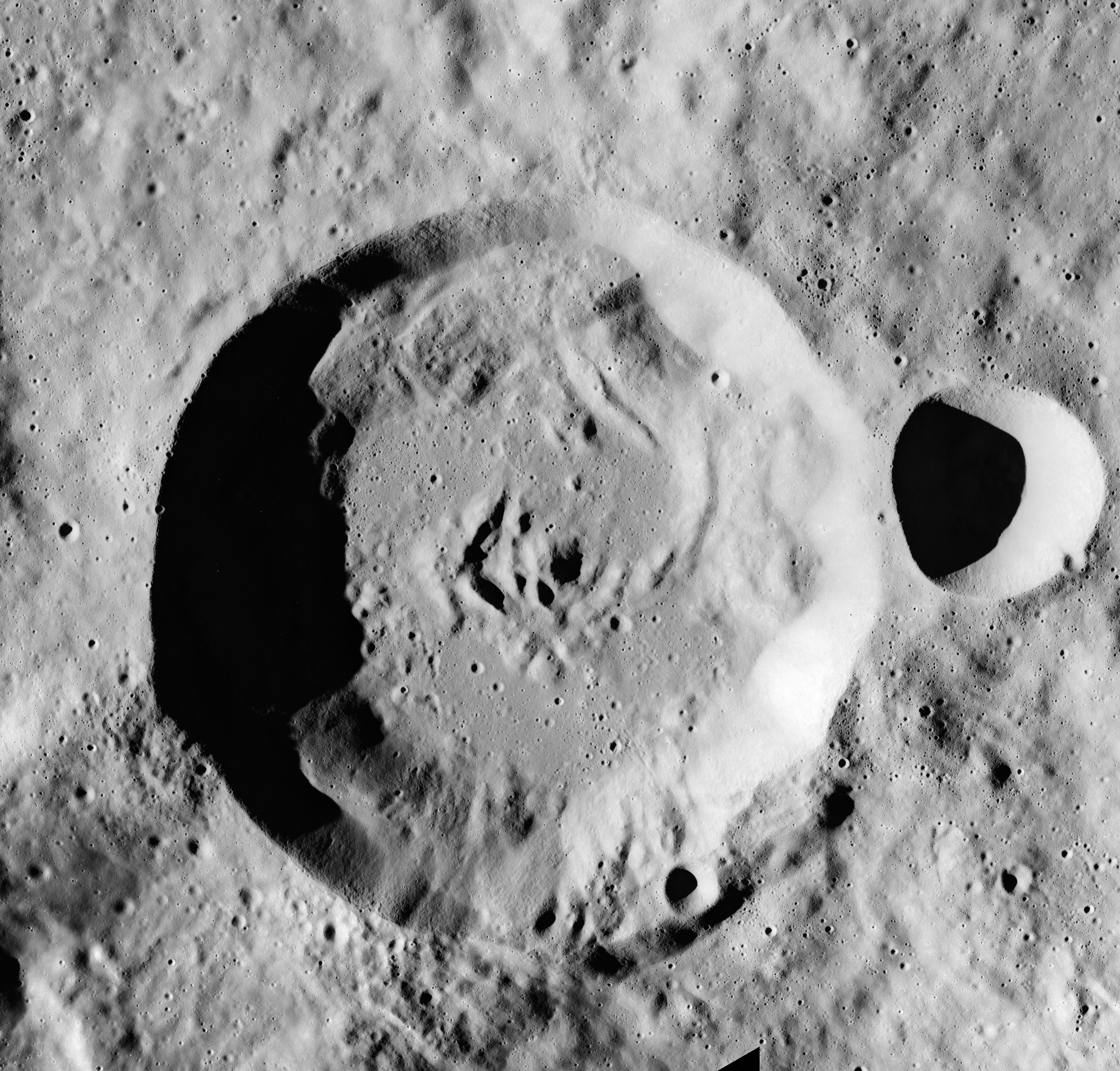
- Apollo 16 image
- Coordinates: 7.0°N 176.5°E
- Diameter: 53 km
- Depth: Unknown
- Colongitude: 176° at sunrise
- Eponym: Arne W. K. Tiselius

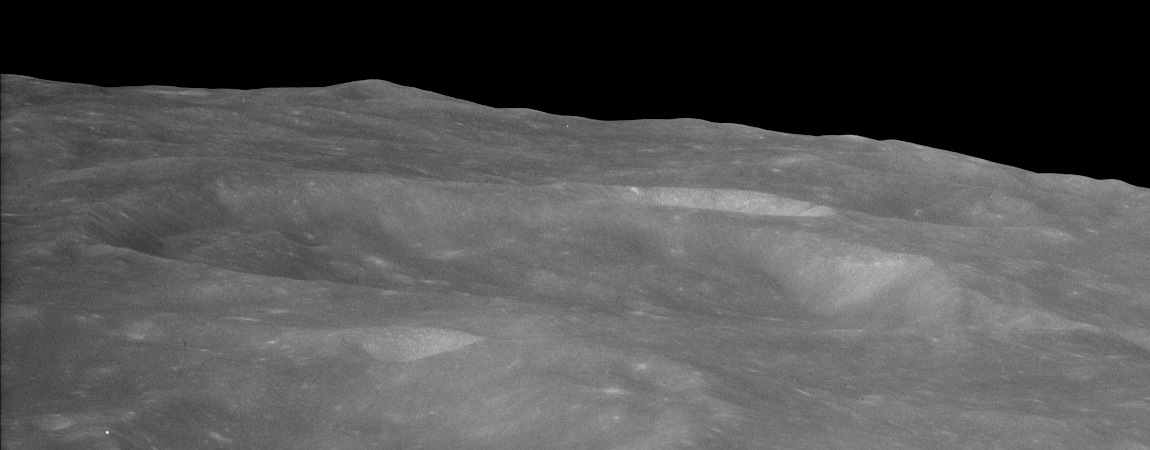
Highly oblique view facing northeast from Apollo 11

Tiselius is a lunar impact crater that lies just to the east of Valier, on the Moon's far side. The craters Tiselius and Valier are separated by only a few kilometers. Less than one crater diameter to the east of Tiselius is the smaller, elongated Stein, and to the north is the small, eroded Šafařík.

This is a roughly circular crater with a well-defined edge that has not been significantly degraded by impact erosion. The inner walls have slumped in places to form piles of scree. The interior floor is marked by a few small craterlets, and there is an irregular group of ridges around the midpoint. The small, cup-shaped satellite crater Tiselius E lies near the eastern outer edge.

The crater was named after Swedish biochemist Arne Tiselius, by the IAU in 1979.

== Satellite craters ==
By convention these features are identified on lunar maps by placing the letter on the side of the crater midpoint that is closest to Tiselius.

Tiselius	Latitude	Longitude	Diameter
E	7.3° N	177.7° E	17 km
L	4.6° N	177.4° E	12 km
