= Coriolis (crater) =

Lunar impact crater

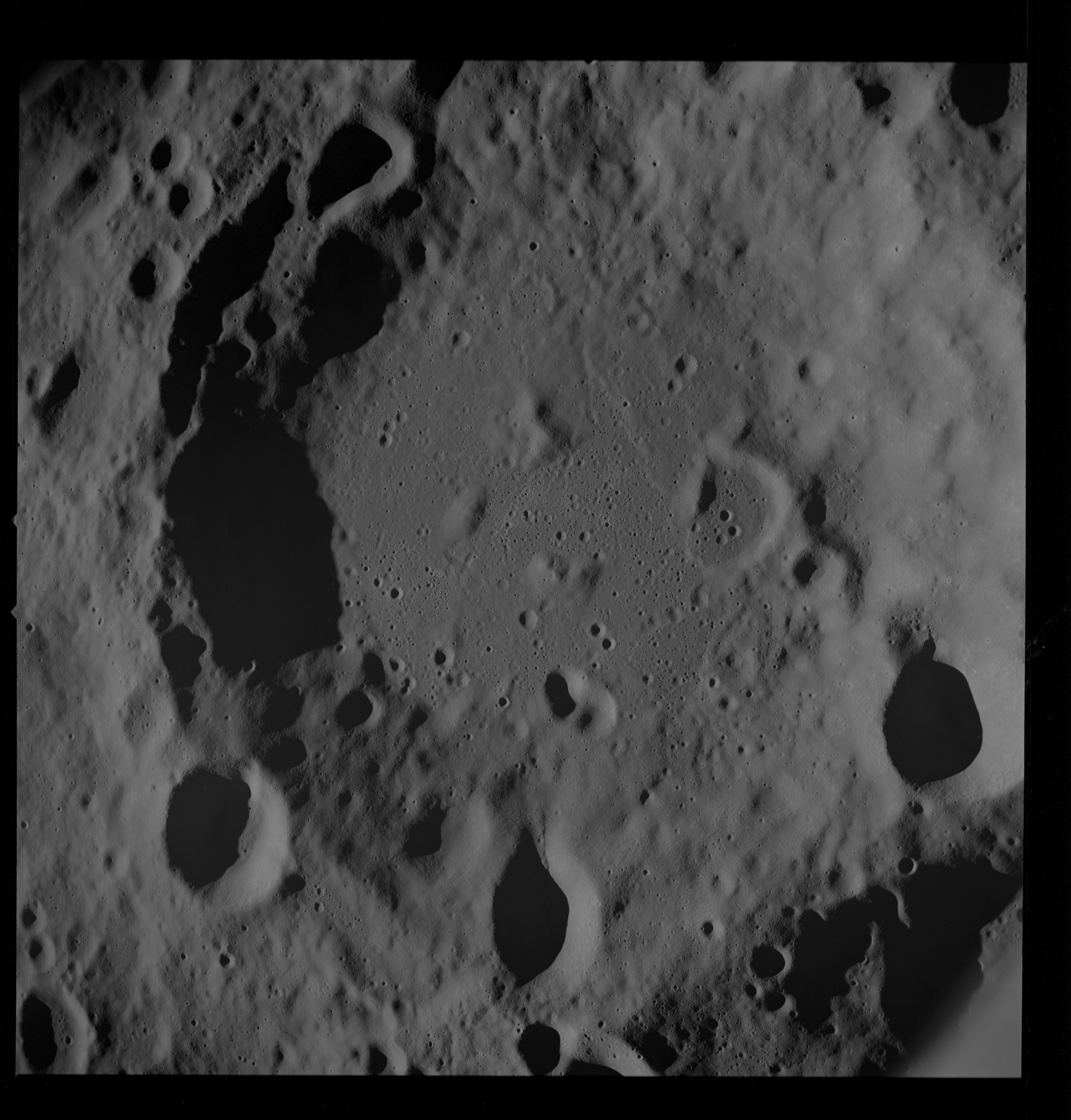
- Coriolis from Apollo 10. NASA photo.
- Coordinates: 0.1°N 171.8°E
- Diameter: 78.56 km (48.81 mi)
- Depth: Unknown
- Colongitude: 188° at sunrise
- Formation: Nectarian
- Eponym: Gaspard G. Coriolis

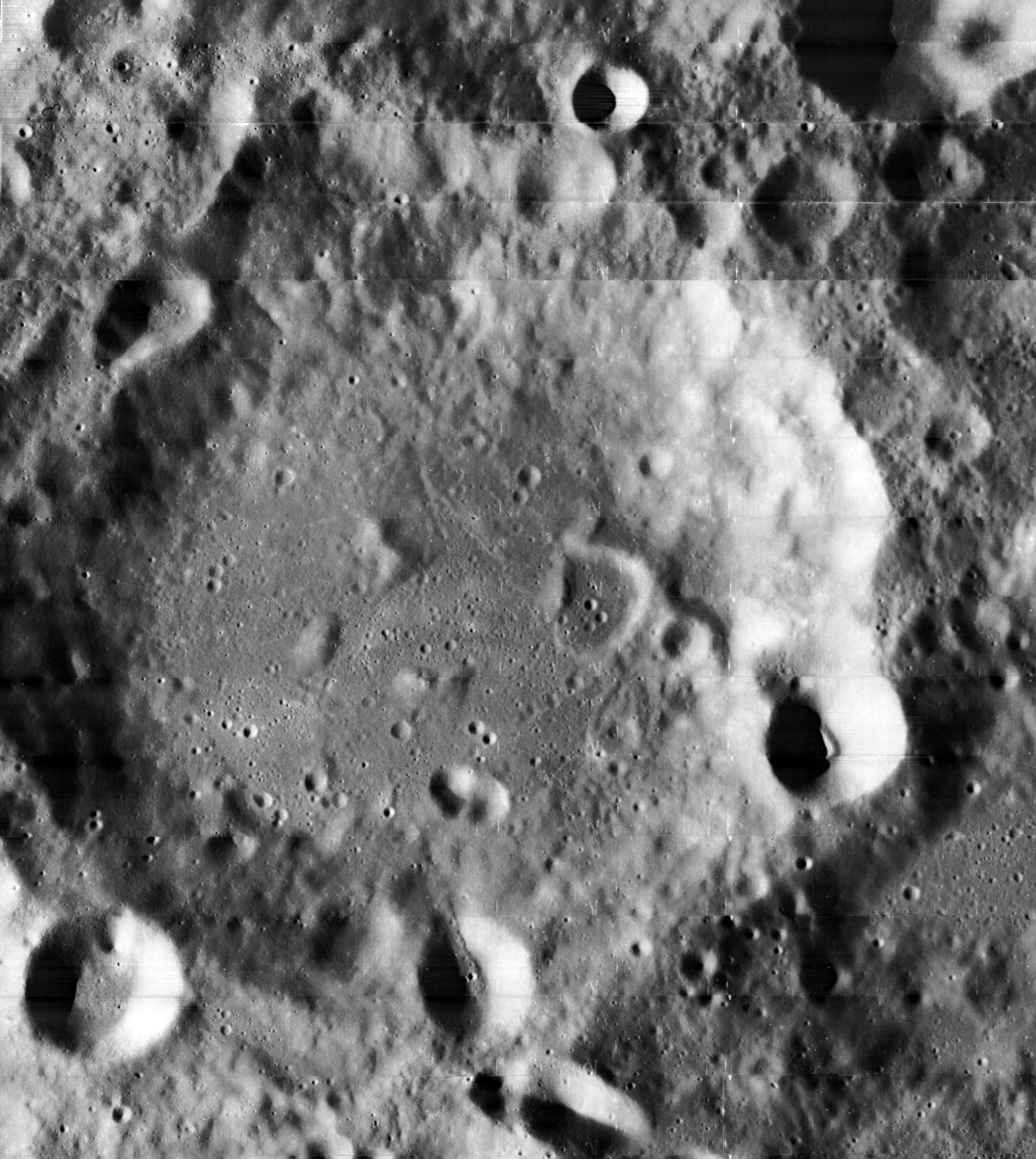
Lunar Orbiter 2 image

Coriolis is a lunar impact crater that is located on the far side of the Moon. The crater floor is bisected by the lunar equator, and it lies about three crater diameters northwest of the crater Daedalus.

This formation dates to the Nectarian period of the lunar geologic timescale. The rim is somewhat eroded, and several small craters lie along the edge. The northern rim is somewhat damaged, and has a slight outward bulge and depression in the side. The interior floor has small craters along the eastern and southern inner walls. There are also some low hills near the mid-part of the floor. A short crater chain to the south of Coriolis may be the result of the Mendel'sham impact to the northwest.

This crater is named after French physicist Gaspard G. Coriolis (1792–1843). Its designation was officially adopted by the International Astronomical Union in 1970.

== Satellite craters ==
By convention, these features are identified on lunar maps by placing the letter on the side of the crater midpoint that is closest to Coriolis.

Coriolis	Latitude	Longitude	Diameter
C	1.9° N	173.3° E	19 km
G	0.0° N	174.7° E	17 km
H	0.5° S	174.2° E	12 km
L	1.9° S	172.7° E	32 km
M	1.4° S	171.7° E	31 km
S	0.1° N	169.7° E	17 km
W	3.1° N	168.0° E	37 km
Y	3.6° N	171.2° E	31 km
Z	4.2° N	171.5° E	53 km

Satellite craters photographed by Apollo 11:

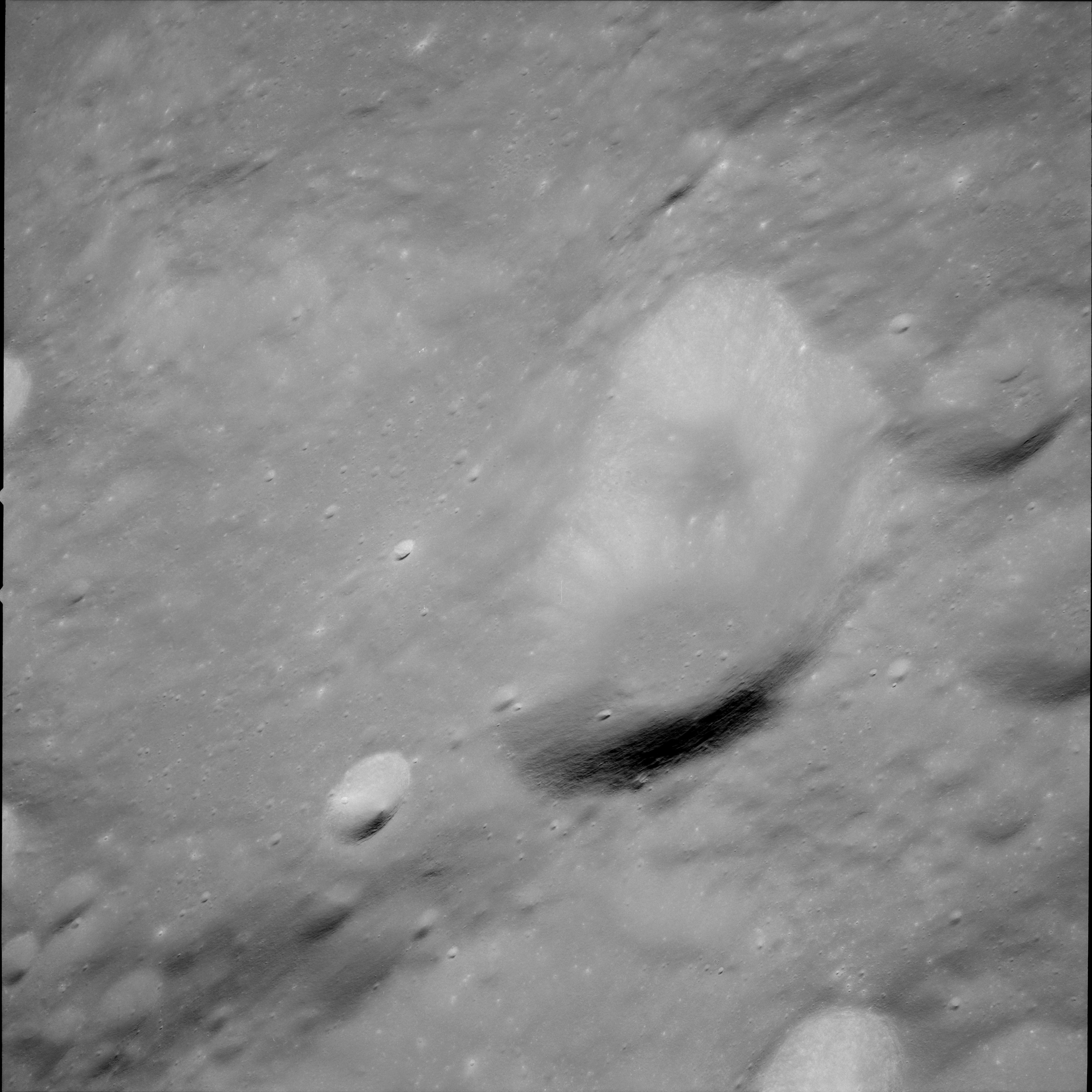
Coriolis C

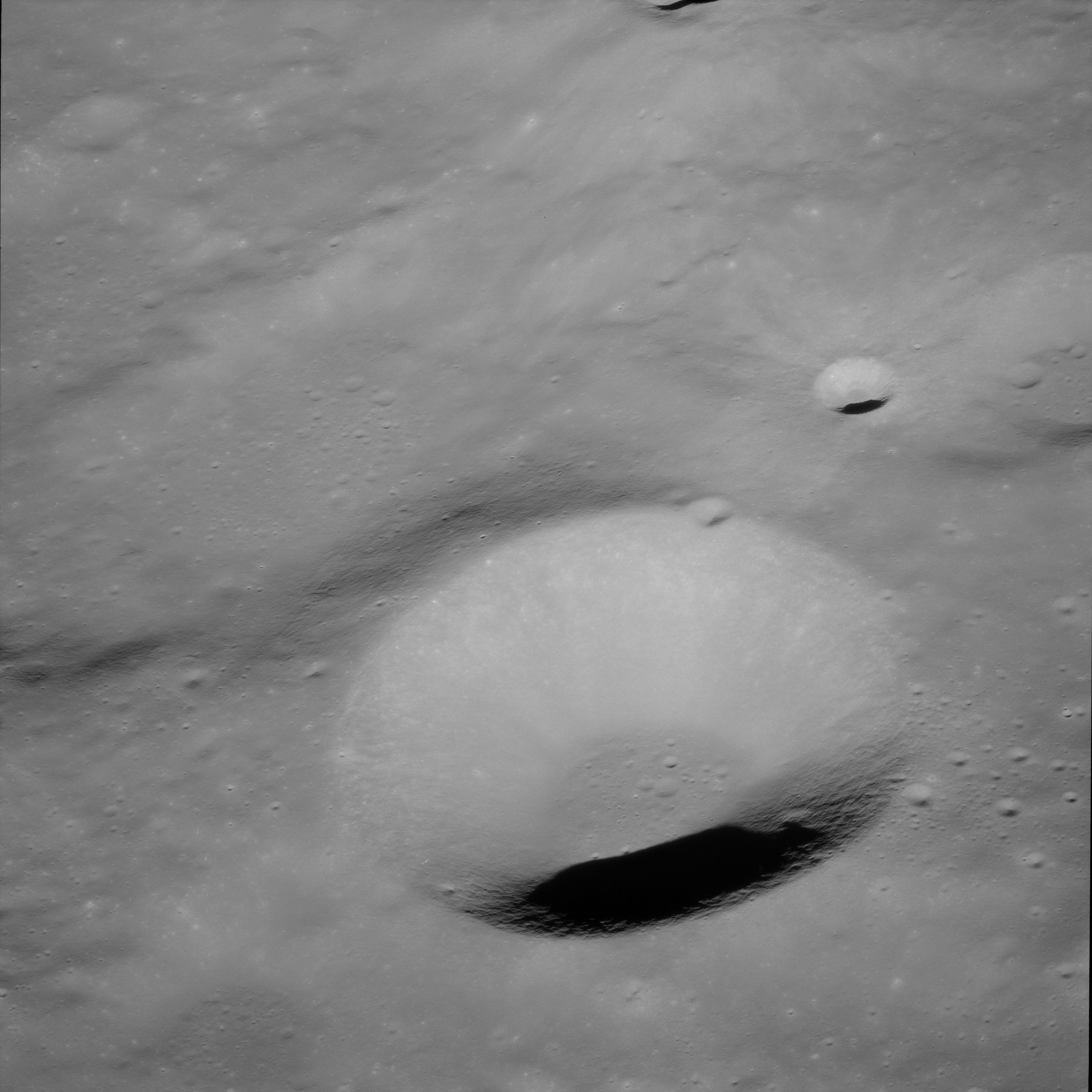
Coriolis G

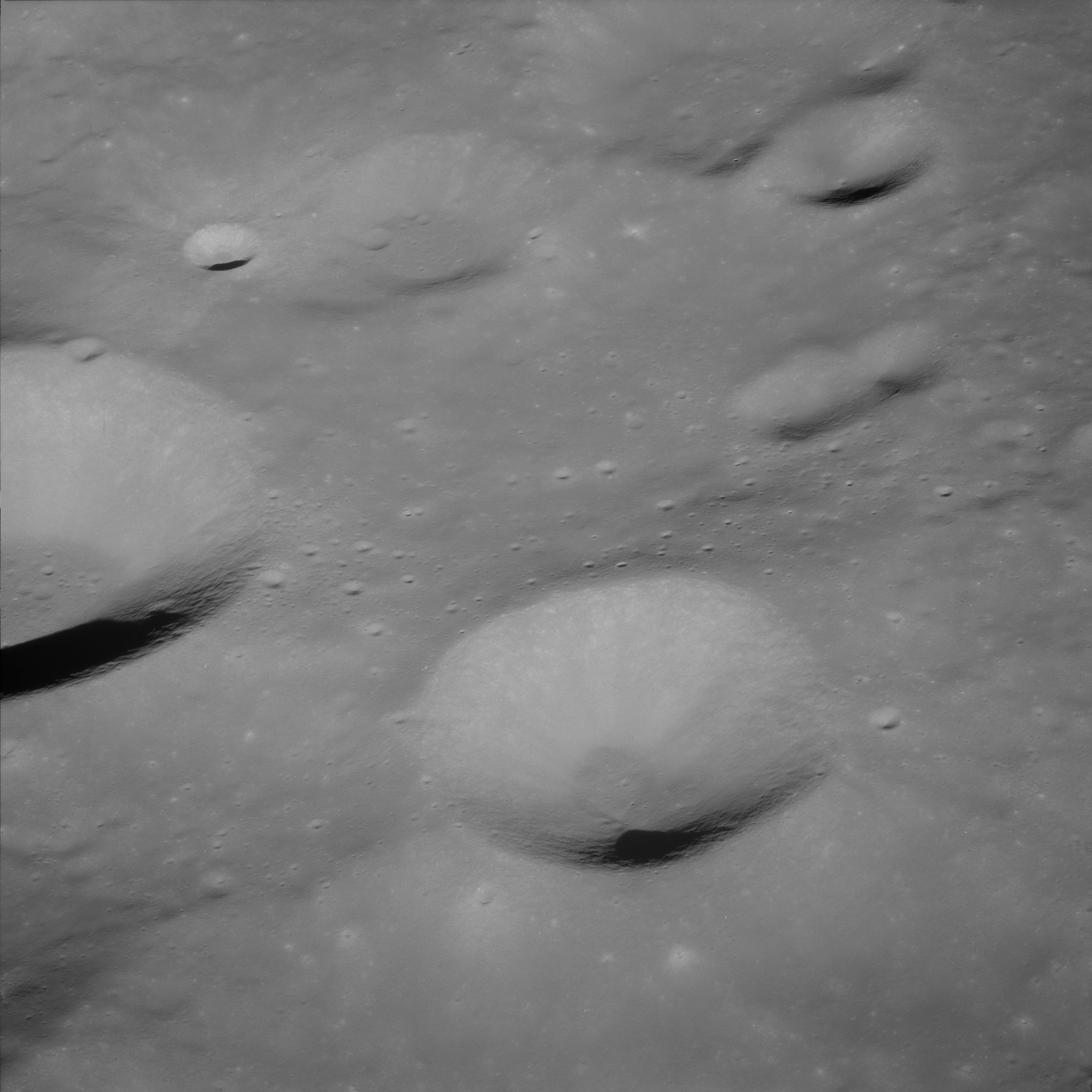
Coriolis H

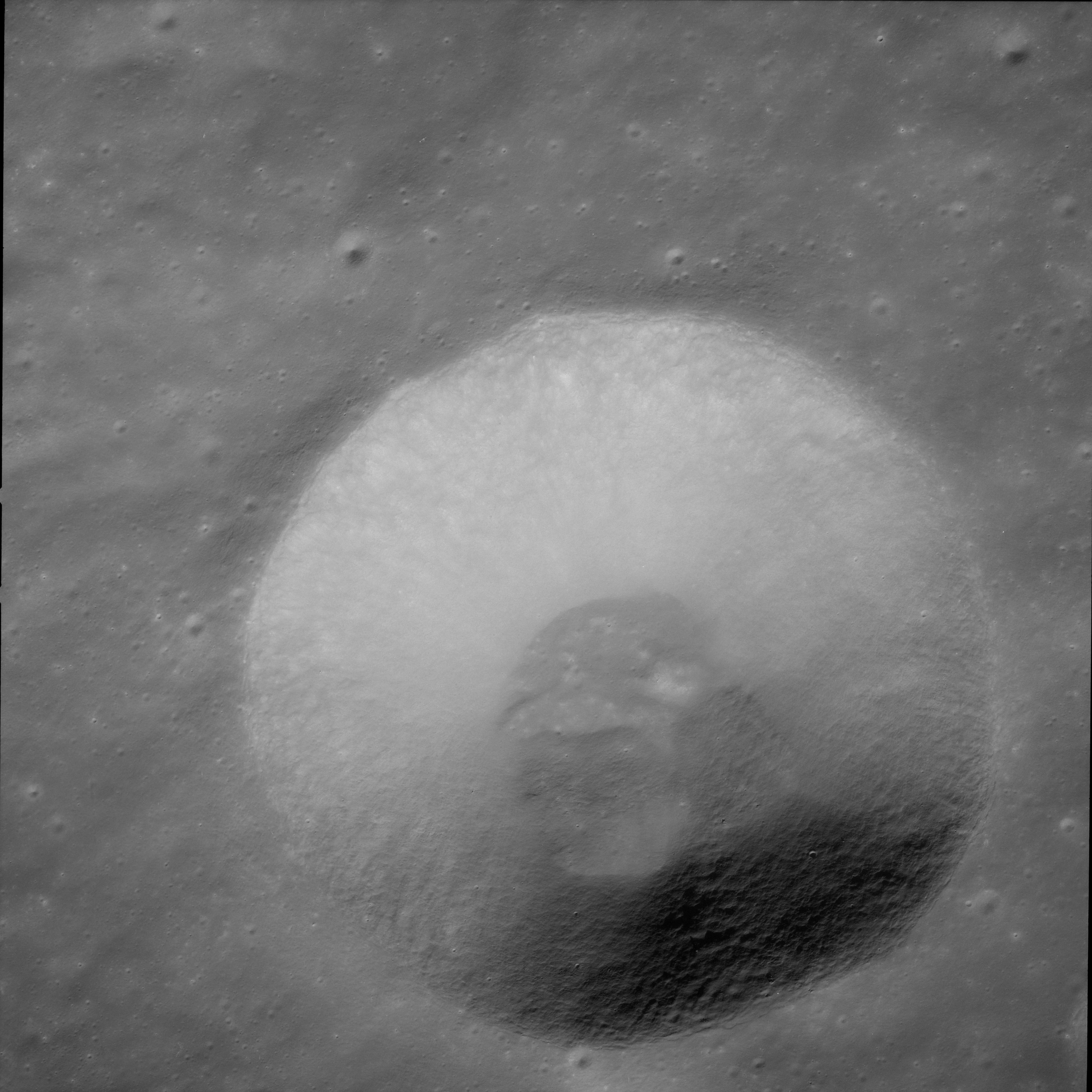
Coriolis S

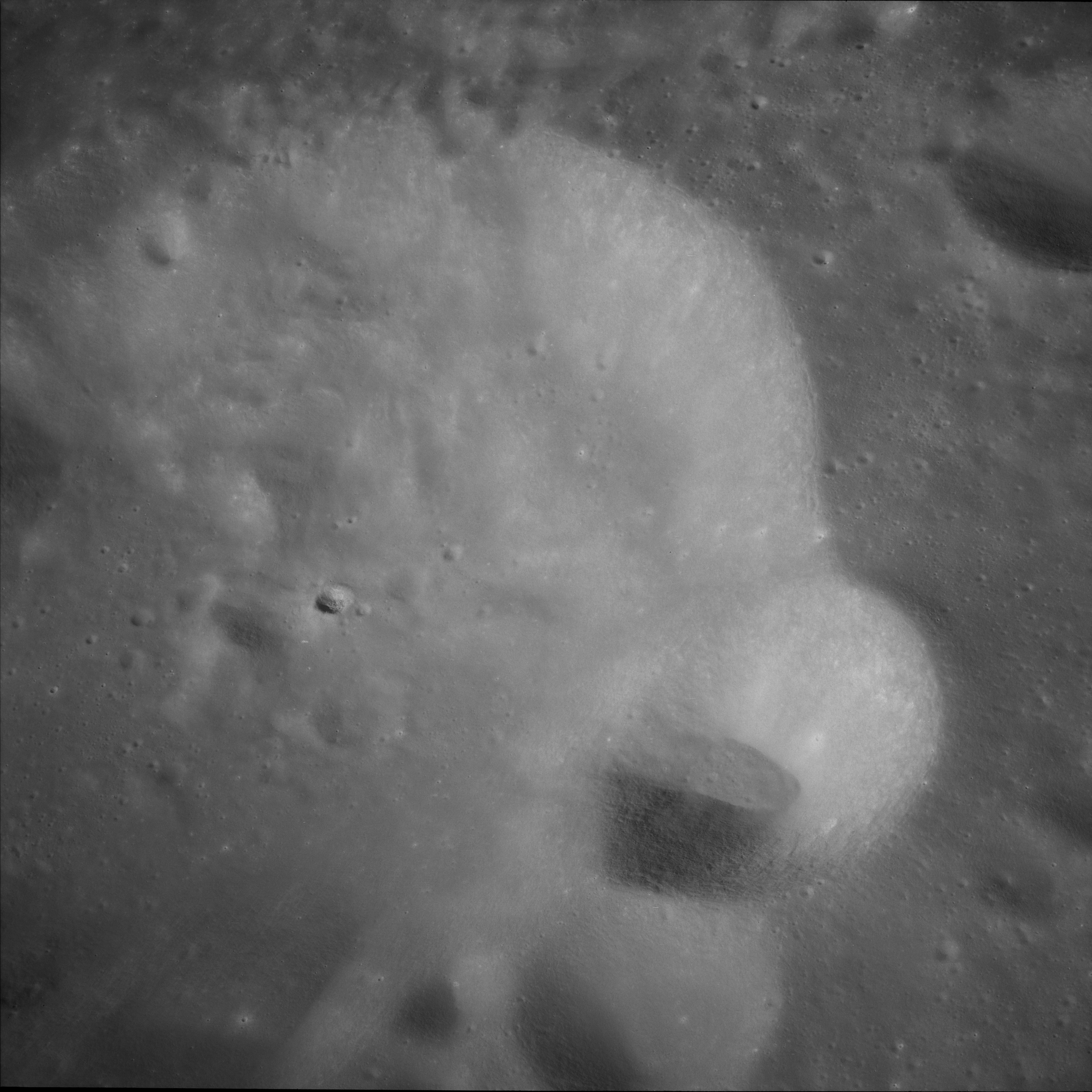
Coriolis W

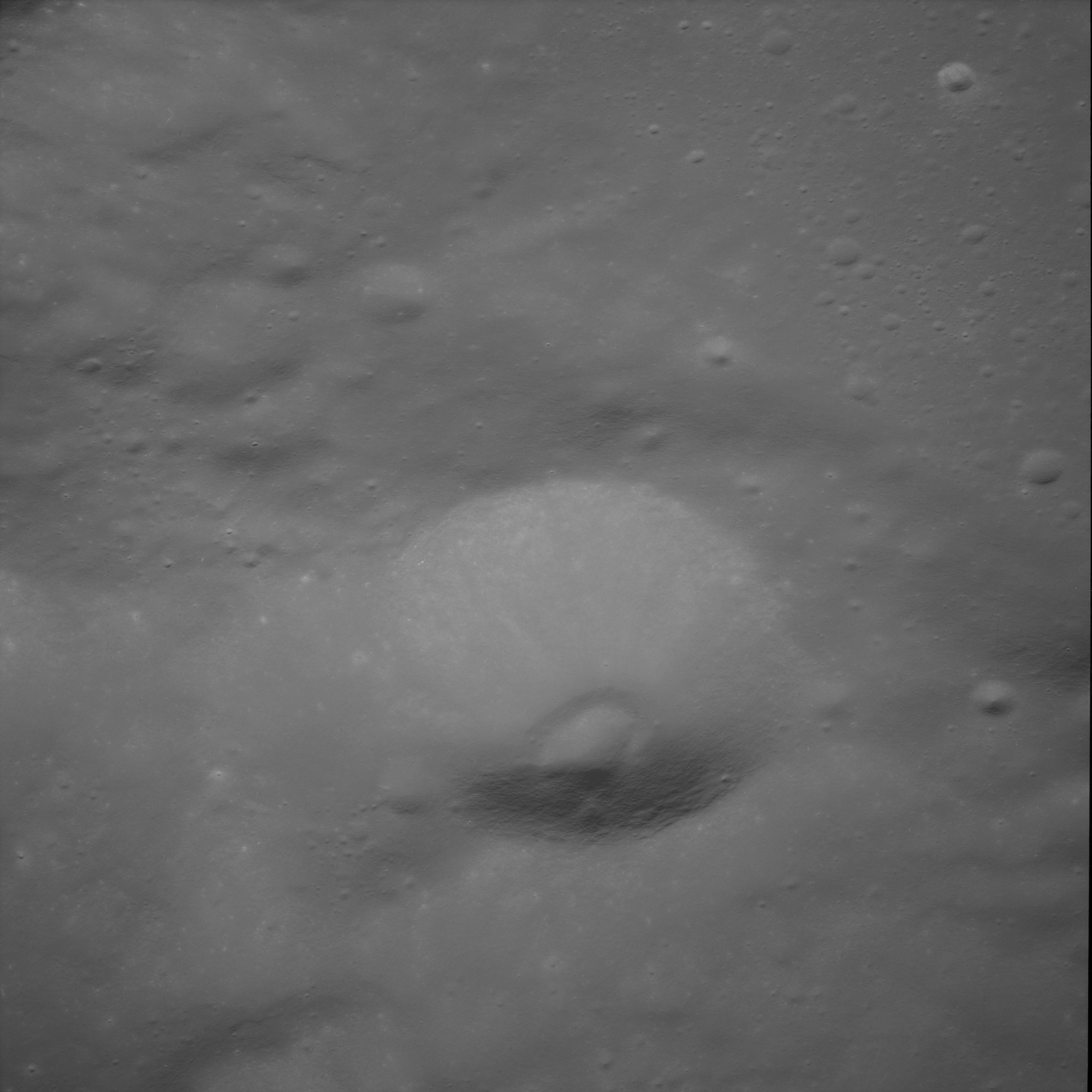
East rim of Coriolis
