= List of craters on the Moon: G–K =

The list of approved names in the Gazetteer of Planetary Nomenclature maintained by the International Astronomical Union includes the diameter of the crater and the person the crater is named for. Where a crater formation has associated satellite craters, these are detailed on the main crater description pages.

List of craters on the Moon

- A
- B
- C
- D
- E
- F
- G
- H
- I
- J
- K
- L
- M
- N
- O
- P
- Q
- R
- S
- T
- U
- V
- W
- X
- Y
- Z

== G ==
Crater	Coordinates	Diameter (km)	Approval Year	Eponym	Ref
G. Bond	32.39°N 36.32°E	19.05	1935	George Phillips Bond (1826–1865)	WGPSN
Gadomski	36.21°N 147.36°W	65.66	1970	Jan Gadomski (1889–1966)	WGPSN
Gagarin	19.66°S 149.35°E	261.83	1970	Yuri Gagarin (1934–1968)	WGPSN
Galen	21.95°N 4.96°E	9.18	1973	Claudius Galen (c. 129–200)	WGPSN
Galilaei	10.48°N 62.83°W	15.99	1935	Galileo Galilei (1564–1642)	WGPSN
Galimov	64.32°S 126.59°W	33.00	2024	Erik Galimov (1936–1920)	WGPSN
Galle	55.87°N 22.33°E	20.96	1935	Johann Gottfried Galle (1812–1910)	WGPSN
Galois	13.94°S 152.99°W	231.97	1970	Évariste Galois (1811–1832)	WGPSN
Galvani	49.51°N 84.56°W	76.83	1961	Luigi Galvani (1737–1798)	WGPSN
Gambart	0.92°N 15.24°W	24.68	1935	Jean Félix Adolphe Gambart (1800–1836)	WGPSN
Gamow	65.29°N 144.65°E	113.92	1970	George Gamow (1904–1968)	WGPSN
Ganskiy	9.64°S 97°E	42.11	1970	Aleksey Pavlovitch Hansky (1870–1908)	WGPSN
Ganswindt	79.42°S 111.17°E	77.52	1970	Hermann Ganswindt (1856–1934)	WGPSN
Garavito	47.21°S 156.78°E	81.05	1970	Julio Garavito Armero (1865–1920)	WGPSN
Gardner	17.75°N 33.81°E	17.62	1976	Irvine Clifton Gardner (1889–1972)	WGPSN
Gärtner	59.24°N 34.76°E	101.79	1935	Christian Gärtner (c. 1750–1813)	WGPSN
Gassendi	17.55°S 39.96°W	111.39	1935	Pierre Gassendi (1592–1655)	WGPSN
Gaston	30.88°N 33.96°W	2.02	1979	(French male name)	WGPSN
Gaudibert	10.93°S 37.82°E	33.14	1935	Casimir Marie Gaudibert (1823–1901)	WGPSN
Gauricus	33.91°S 12.74°W	79.64	1935	Luca Gaurico (1476–1558)	WGPSN
Gauss	36.01°N 79.08°E	170.72	1935	Carl Friedrich Gauss (1777–1855)	WGPSN
Gavrilov	17.41°N 131.22°E	61.62	1970	Aleksandr I. Gavrilov (1884–1955) and Igor V. Gavrilov (1928–1982)	WGPSN
Gay-Lussac	13.88°N 20.79°W	25.4	1935	Joseph-Louis Gay-Lussac (1778–1850)	WGPSN
Geber	19.46°S 13.85°E	44.68	1935	Jabir ibn Aflah (1100–1150)	WGPSN
Geiger	14.39°S 158.41°E	36.63	1970	Johannes Hans Wilhelm Geiger (1882–1945)	WGPSN
Geissler	2.6°S 76.51°E	17.39	1976	Heinrich Geissler (1814–1879)	WGPSN
Geminus	34.42°N 56.66°E	81.98	1935	Geminus (unknown-circa 70 BC)	WGPSN
Gemma Frisius	34.33°S 13.37°E	88.54	1935	Gemma Frisius (1508–1555)	WGPSN
Gena	38.3°N 35°W	0.2	2012	Russian male name	WGPSN
Gerard	44.54°N 80.51°W	98.78	1935	Alexander Gerard (1792–1839)	WGPSN
Gerasimovich	22.95°S 123.42°W	90.19	1970	Boris P. Gerasimovich (1889–1937)	WGPSN
Gernsback	36.53°S 99.53°E	47.2	1970	Hugo Gernsback (1884–1967)	WGPSN
Gibbs	18.37°S 84.27°E	78.76	1964	Josiah Willard Gibbs (1839–1903)	WGPSN
Gilbert	3.2°S 76.16°E	100.25	1964	Grove Karl Gilbert (1843–1918) and William Gilbert (1544–1603)	WGPSN
Gill	63.77°S 75.95°E	63.9	1964	David Gill (astronomer) (1843–1914)	WGPSN
Ginzel	14.25°N 97.4°E	53.23	1970	Friedrich Karl Ginzel (1850–1926)	WGPSN
Gioja	83.35°N 1.76°E	42.47	1935	Flavio Gioja (flourished 1302)	WGPSN
Giordano Bruno	35.97°N 102.89°E	22.13	1961	Giordano Bruno (1548–1600)	WGPSN
Glaisher	13.19°N 49.34°E	15.92	1935	James Glaisher (1809–1903)	WGPSN
Glauber	11.32°N 142.67°E	15.24	1976	Johann Rudolf Glauber (c. 1603–1670)	WGPSN
Glazenap	1.85°S 137.76°E	38.96	1970	Sergej Pavlovich von Glazenap (1848–1937)	WGPSN
Glushko	8.11°N 77.67°W	40.1	1994	Valentin Petrovitch Glushko (1908–1989)	WGPSN
Goclenius	10.05°S 45.03°E	73.04	1935	Rudolf Goclenius, Jr. (1572–1621)	WGPSN
Goddard	15.15°N 89.13°E	93.18	1964	Robert H. Goddard (1882–1945)	WGPSN
Godin	1.82°N 10.16°E	34.25	1935	Louis Godin (1704–1760)	WGPSN
Goldschmidt	73.04°N 3.37°W	115.26	1935	Hermann Goldschmidt (1802–1866)	WGPSN
Golgi	27.78°N 59.96°W	5.58	1976	Camillo Golgi (1843–1926)	WGPSN
Golitsyn	25.2°S 105.2°W	35.47	1970	Boris Borisovich Golitsyn (1862–1916)	WGPSN
Golovin	39.75°N 161.24°E	37.86	1970	Nicholas Erasmus Golovin (1912–1969)	WGPSN
Goodacre	32.67°S 14.08°E	44.09	1935	Walter Goodacre (1856–1938)	WGPSN
Gore	86.18°N 62.31°W	9.41	2009	John Ellard Gore (1845–1910)	WGPSN
Gould	19.26°S 17.25°W	32.99	1935	Benjamin Apthorp Gould (1824–1896)	WGPSN
Grace	14.21°N 35.89°E	1.49	1979	(English female name)	WGPSN
Grachev	3.83°S 108.42°W	34.98	1970	Andrej D. Grachev (1900–1964)	WGPSN
Graff	42.3°S 88.71°W	36.16	1970	Kasimir Romuald Graff (1878–1950)	WGPSN
Grave	17.04°S 150.23°E	36.95	1976	Dmitry Aleksandrovich Grave (1863–1939) and Ivan Platonovich Grave (1874–1960)	WGPSN
Greaves	13.18°N 52.79°E	14.27	1976	William Michael Herbert Greaves (1897–1955)	WGPSN
Green	3.69°N 133.12°E	68.28	1970	George Green (1793–1841)	WGPSN
Gregory	1.76°N 127.28°E	63.9	1970	James Gregory (1638–1675)	WGPSN
Grigg	12.5°N 130.13°W	36.72	1970	John Grigg (1838–1920)	WGPSN
Grimaldi	5.38°S 68.36°W	173.49	1935	Francesco Maria Grimaldi (1618–1663)	WGPSN
Grignard	84.54°N 75.83°W	12.95	2009	Victor Grignard (1871–1935)	WGPSN
Grissom	46.92°S 147.98°W	59.82	1970	Virgil "Gus" I. Grissom (1926–1967)	WGPSN
Grotrian	66.15°S 128.28°E	36.78	1970	Walter Grotrian (1890–1954)	WGPSN
Grove	40.3°N 32.98°E	28.55	1935	Sir William Robert Grove (1811–1896)	WGPSN
Gruemberger	67.04°S 10.3°W	91.5	1935	Christoph Grienberger (1561–1636)	WGPSN
Gruithuisen	32.89°N 39.78°W	14.98	1935	Franz von Paula Gruithuisen (1774–1852)	WGPSN
Guericke	11.57°S 14.19°W	60.75	1935	Otto von Guericke (1602–1686)	WGPSN
Guest	19.79°S 117.39°E	19.79	2017	John E. Guest (1938–2012)	WGPSN
Guillaume	45.16°N 173.38°W	56.75	1979	Charles Édouard Guillaume (1861–1938)	WGPSN
Gullstrand	44.95°N 129.67°W	45.05	1970	Allvar Gullstrand (1862–1930)	WGPSN
Gum	40.34°S 88.91°E	54.55	1970	Colin Stanley Gum (1924–1960)	WGPSN
Gutenberg	8.61°S 41.25°E	70.65	1935	Johann Gutenberg (c. 1398–1468)	WGPSN
Guthnick	47.76°S 94.04°W	37.03	1970	Paul Guthnick (1879–1947)	WGPSN
Guyot	11.63°N 117.12°E	98.28	1970	Arnold Henry Guyot (1807–1884)	WGPSN
Gyldén	5.37°S 0.23°E	48.15	1935	Hugo Gyldén (1841–1896)	WGPSN

back to top

== H ==
Crater	Coordinates	Diameter (km)	Approval Year	Eponym	Ref
H. G. Wells	40.84°N 122.63°E	108.9	1970	H. G. Wells, writer (1866–1946)	WGPSN
Haber	83.4°N 94.63°W	56.79	2009	Fritz Haber (1868–1934)	WGPSN
Hagecius	59.92°S 46.63°E	79.55	1935	Tadeáš Hájek (1525–1600)	WGPSN
Hagen	48.32°S 135.95°E	57.52	1970	Johann Georg Hagen (1847–1930)	WGPSN
Hahn	31.22°N 73.55°E	87.49	1935	Friedrich von Hahn (1741–1805) and Otto Hahn (1879–1968)	WGPSN
Haidinger	39.18°S 25.14°W	21.33	1935	Wilhelm Karl von Haidinger (1795–1871)	WGPSN
Hainzel	41.23°S 33.52°W	70.56	1935	Paul Hainzel (flourished 1570)	WGPSN
Haldane	1.66°S 84.11°E	40.26	1973	John Burdon Sanderson Haldane (1892–1964)	WGPSN
Hale	74.13°S 91.71°E	84.42	1964	George Ellery Hale (1868–1938) and William Hale (1797–1870)	WGPSN
Hall	33.81°N 36.75°E	31.77	1935	Asaph Hall (1829–1907)	WGPSN
Halley	8.05°S 5.73°E	34.59	1935	Edmond Halley (1656–1742)	WGPSN
Hamilton	42.77°S 84.41°E	57.45	1964	William Rowan Hamilton (1805–1865)	WGPSN
Hanno	56.46°S 71.38°E	59.54	1935	Hanno the Navigator (circa 500 BC)	WGPSN
Hansen	14.04°N 72.54°E	41.18	1935	Peter Andreas Hansen (1795–1874)	WGPSN
Hansteen	11.53°S 52.06°W	44.99	1935	Christopher Hansteen (1784–1873)	WGPSN
Harden	5.46°N 143.55°E	14.98	1976	Arthur Harden (1865–1940)	WGPSN
Harding	43.54°N 71.66°W	22.57	1935	Karl Ludwig Harding (1765–1834)	WGPSN
Haret	58.77°S 176.19°W	29.77	1970	Spiru Haret (1851–1912)	WGPSN
Hargreaves	2.18°S 64.09°E	18	1979	Frederick James Hargreaves (1891–1970)	WGPSN
Harkhebi	40.87°N 98.74°E	337.14	1979	Harkhebi (circa 300 BC)	WGPSN
Harlan	38.31°S 79.65°E	63.45	2000	Harlan James Smith (1924–1991)	WGPSN
Harold	10.88°S 6.07°W	1.43	1976	(Scandinavian male name)	WGPSN
Harpalus	52.73°N 43.49°W	39.77	1935	Harpalus (unknown-circa 460 BC)	WGPSN
Harriot	33.2°N 114.4°E	52.77	1970	Thomas Harriot (1560–1621)	WGPSN
Hartmann	2.71°N 135.45°E	63.29	1970	Johannes Franz Hartmann (1865–1936)	WGPSN
Hartwig	6.14°S 80.47°W	78.46	1964	Carl Ernst Albrecht Hartwig (1851–1923)	WGPSN
Harvey	19.35°N 146.51°W	59.98	1970	William Harvey (1578–1657)	WGPSN
Hase	29.37°S 62.68°E	82.08	1935	Johann Matthias Hase (1684–1742)	WGPSN
Haskin	81.51°N 133.16°E	66.57	2009	Larry Haskin (1934–2005)	WGPSN
Hatanaka	29.33°N 121.92°W	30.15	1970	Takeo Hatanaka (1914–1963)	WGPSN
Hausen	65.11°S 88.49°W	163.24	1961	Christian August Hausen (1693–1743)	WGPSN
Haworth	87.45°S 5.17°W	51.42	2008	Walter Norman Haworth (1883–1950)	WGPSN
Hayford	12.68°N 176.45°W	28.15	1970	John Fillmore Hayford (1868–1925)	WGPSN
Hayn	64.56°N 83.87°E	86.21	1964	Friedrich Hayn (1863–1928)	WGPSN
Haynes	88.75°S 167.39°E	17.00	2025	Euphemia Haynes (1890–1980)	WGPSN
Healy	32.5°N 111°W	37.98	1970	Roy Healy (1915–1968)	WGPSN
Heaviside	10.44°S 166.77°E	164.46	1970	Oliver Heaviside (1850–1925)	WGPSN
Hecataeus	22.06°S 79.68°E	133.67	1935	Hecataeus of Miletus (unknown-circa 476 BC)	WGPSN
Hédervári	81.77°S 85.6°E	74.14	1994	Peter Hédervári (1931–1984)	WGPSN
Hedin	2.87°N 76.57°W	157.38	1964	Sven Hedin (1865–1952)	WGPSN
Heinrich	24.84°N 15.37°W	6.86	1979	Vladimír Václav Heinrich (1884–1965)	WGPSN
Heinsius	39.48°S 17.82°W	64.87	1935	Gottfried Heinsius (1709–1769)	WGPSN
Heis	32.47°N 31.98°W	13.69	1935	Eduard Heis (1806–1877)	WGPSN
Helberg	22.63°N 102.46°W	61.93	1970	Robert J. Helberg (1906–1967)	WGPSN
Helicon	40.43°N 23.11°W	23.74	1935	Helicon of Cyzicus (unknown-circa 400 BC)	WGPSN
Hell	32.41°S 7.8°W	33.31	1935	Maximilian Hell (1720–1792)	WGPSN
Helmert	7.56°S 87.67°E	26.72	1973	Friedrich Robert Helmert (1843–1917)	WGPSN
Helmholtz	68.64°S 65.34°E	110.16	1935	Hermann von Helmholtz (1821–1894)	WGPSN
Henderson	4.76°N 152°E	43.49	1970	Thomas Henderson (1798–1844)	WGPSN
Hendrix	46.86°S 159.97°W	16.63	1970	Don Osgood Hendrix (1905–1961)	WGPSN
Henry	23.97°S 57.01°W	39.06	1970	Joseph Henry (1792–1878)	WGPSN
Henry Frères	23.52°S 59.02°W	41.73	1961	Paul Henry and Prosper Henry (1848–1905, 1849–1903)	WGPSN
Henyey	12.7°N 152.33°W	68.74	1970	Louis G. Henyey (1910–1970)	WGPSN
Heraclitus	49.31°S 6.42°E	85.74	1935	Heraclitus (c. 540–480 BC)	WGPSN
Hercules	46.82°N 39.21°E	68.32	1935	Hercules	WGPSN
Herigonius	13.36°S 33.97°W	14.86	1935	Pierre Herigone (flourished 1644)	WGPSN
Hermann	0.87°S 57.47°W	15.92	1935	Jacob Hermann (1678–1733)	WGPSN
Hermite	86.17°N 93.32°W	108.64	1964	Charles Hermite (1822–1901)	WGPSN
Herodotus	23.25°N 49.84°W	35.87	1935	Herodotus (c. 484–408 BC)	WGPSN
Heron	0.65°N 119.88°E	28.1	1976	Heron (Hero) (unknown-circa 100 BC)	WGPSN
Herschel	5.69°S 2.09°W	39.09	1935	William Herschel (1738–1822)	WGPSN
Hertz	13.32°N 104.56°E	82.94	1961	Heinrich Rudolf Hertz (1857–1894)	WGPSN
Hertzsprung	1.37°N 128.66°W	536.37	1970	Ejnar Hertzsprung (1873–1967)	WGPSN
Hesiodus	29.42°S 16.42°W	43.24	1935	Hesiod (circa 735 BC)	WGPSN
Hess	54.47°S 174.19°E	90.44	1970	Victor Franz Hess (1883–1964) and Harry Hammond Hess (1906–1969)	WGPSN
Hevelius	2.2°N 67.46°W	113.87	1935	Johannes Hevelius (1611–1687)	WGPSN
Hevesy	83.09°N 149.15°E	49.99	2009	George de Hevesy (1885–1966)	WGPSN
Heymans	74.76°N 144.94°W	46.45	1970	Corneille Jean François Heymans (1892–1968)	WGPSN
Heyrovsky	39.55°S 95.42°W	16.66	1985	Jaroslav Heyrovský (1890–1967)	WGPSN
Hilbert	17.87°S 108.32°E	173.24	1970	David Hilbert (1862–1943)	WGPSN
Hildegard	51.68°S 127.74°E	122	2016	Hildegard von Bingen (1098–1179)	WGPSN
Hill	20.91°N 40.81°E	15.86	1973	George William Hill (1838–1914)	WGPSN
Hind	7.92°S 7.31°E	28.5	1935	John Russell Hind (1823–1895)	WGPSN
Hinshelwood	89.41°N 51.89°W	13.35	2009	Cyril Norman Hinshelwood (1897–1967)	WGPSN
Hippalus	24.92°S 30.42°W	57.36	1935	Hippalus (unknown-circa 120)	WGPSN
Hipparchus	5.36°S 4.91°E	143.95	1935	Hipparchus (flourished 140 BC)	WGPSN
Hippocrates	70.26°N 146.54°W	59.24	1970	Hippocrates (c. 460–377 BC)	WGPSN
Hirayama	6.01°S 93.63°E	145.21	1970	Kiyotsugu Hirayama (1874–1943) and Shin Hirayama (1867–1945)	WGPSN
Hoffmeister	15.04°N 136.84°E	44.46	1970	Cuno Hoffmeister (1892–1968)	WGPSN
Hogg	33.51°N 121.96°E	38.39	1970	Arthur Robert Hogg (1903–1966) and Frank Scott Hogg (1904–1951)	WGPSN
Hohmann	17.92°S 94.26°W	16.81	1970	Walter Hohmann (1880–1945)	WGPSN
Holden	19.19°S 62.53°E	47.6	1935	Edward Singleton Holden (1846–1914)	WGPSN
Holetschek	27.61°S 151.15°E	37.77	1970	Johann Holetschek (1846–1923)	WGPSN
Hommel	54.74°S 32.93°E	113.6	1935	Johann Hommel (1518–1562)	WGPSN
Hooke	41.14°N 54.86°E	34.35	1935	Robert Hooke (1635–1703)	WGPSN
Hopmann	51.01°S 159.23°E	87.84	1979	Josef Hopmann (1890–1975)	WGPSN
Hornsby	23.8°N 12.51°E	2.85	1973	Thomas Hornsby (1733–1810)	WGPSN
Horrebow	58.8°N 40.93°W	24.98	1935	Peder Horrebow (1679–1764)	WGPSN
Horrocks	3.99°S 5.85°E	29.65	1935	Jeremiah Horrocks (1619–1641)	WGPSN
Hortensius	6.47°N 28°W	14.16	1935	Martin van den Hove (1605–1639)	WGPSN
Houssay	83.11°N 98.52°E	31.41	2009	Bernardo Houssay (1887–1971)	WGPSN
Houtermans	9.42°S 87.38°E	42.68	1973	Friedrich Georg Houtermans (1903–1966)	WGPSN
Houzeau	17.25°S 123.89°W	76.84	1970	Jean Charles Houzeau (de Lehaie) (1820–1888)	WGPSN
Hubble	22.29°N 86.91°E	81.84	1964	Edwin Powell Hubble (1889–1953)	WGPSN
Huggins	41.07°S 1.52°W	65.79	1935	Sir William Huggins (1824–1910)	WGPSN
Humason	30.73°N 56.66°W	4.34	1973	Milton Lasell Humason (1891–1972)	WGPSN
Humboldt	27.02°S 80.96°E	199.46	1935	Wilhelm von Humboldt (1767–1835)	WGPSN
Hume	4.68°S 90.47°E	22.3	1976	David Hume (1711–1776)	WGPSN
Husband	40.32°S 147.84°W	31.26	2006	Rick Husband (1957–2003)	WGPSN
Hutton	37.22°N 168.68°E	45.17	1970	James Hutton (1726–1797)	WGPSN
Huxley	20.2°N 4.54°W	3.48	1973	Thomas Henry Huxley (1825–1895)	WGPSN
Hyginus	7.76°N 6.27°E	8.7	1935	Gaius Julius Hyginus (flourished first century BC)	WGPSN
Hypatia	4.25°S 22.58°E	38.82	1935	Hypatia of Alexandria (415 AD)	WGPSN

back to top

== I ==
Crater	Coordinates	Diameter (km)	Approval Year	Eponym	Ref
Ian	25.72°N 0.39°W	1.51	1976	(Scottish male name)	WGPSN
Ibn Bajja	86.3°S 75.04°W	11.98	2009	Ibn Bajjah (1095–1138)	WGPSN
Ibn Battuta	6.95°S 50.44°E	11.51	1976	Abu Abdullah Muhammad Ibn Battuta (1304–1377)	WGPSN
Ibn Firnas	6.83°N 122.3°E	88.29	1976	Abbas Ibn Firnas (circa AD 887)	WGPSN
Ibn Yunus	14.14°N 91.14°E	59.69	1970	Abul al-Hasan ben Ahmad (950–1009)	WGPSN
Ibn-Rushd	11.69°S 21.71°E	31.08	1976	Averroës (1126–1198)	WGPSN
Icarus	5.49°S 173.26°W	93.73	1970	Icarus (mythology)	WGPSN
Ideler	49.32°S 22.24°E	37.77	1935	Christian Ludwig Ideler (1766–1846)	WGPSN
Idelʹson	81.35°S 112.69°E	59.82	1970	Naum Ilʹich Idelʹson (1885–1951)	WGPSN
Igor	38.3°N 35°W	0.1	2012	Russian male name	WGPSN
Ilʹin	17.8°S 97.68°W	12.42	1985	Nikolai Yakovlevich Ilʹin (1901–1937)	WGPSN
Ina	18.66°N 5.3°E	2.98	1979	(Latin female name)	WGPSN
Ingalls	26.16°N 153.34°W	37.23	1970	Albert Graham Ingalls (1888–1958)	WGPSN
Inghirami	47.49°S 68.95°W	94.6	1935	Giovanni Inghirami (1779–1851)	WGPSN
Innes	27.85°N 119.31°E	42.83	1970	Robert Thorburn Ayton Innes (1861–1933)	WGPSN
Ioffe	14.38°S 129.16°W	83.95	1970	Abram Fedorovich Ioffe (1880–1960)	WGPSN
Isabel	28.18°N 34.07°W	1.22	1979	(Spanish female name)	WGPSN
Isaev	17.57°S 147.49°E	94.1	1976	Aleksei Mihailovich Isaev (1908–1971)	WGPSN
Isidorus	7.96°S 33.5°E	41.39	1935	St. Isidore of Seville (c. 570–636)	WGPSN
Isis	18.95°N 27.48°E	0.61	1976	Isis (Egyptian goddess)	WGPSN
Ivan	26.86°N 43.26°W	3.84	1976	(Russian male name)	WGPSN
Izsak	23.32°S 117.59°E	30.83	1970	Imre Izsak (1929–1965)	WGPSN

back to top

== J ==
Crater	Coordinates	Diameter (km)	Approval Year	Eponym	Ref
J. Herschel	62.31°N 41.86°W	154.44	1935	John Herschel (1792–1871)	WGPSN
Jackson	22.05°N 163.32°W	71.38	1970	John Jackson (1887–1958)	WGPSN
Jacobi	56.82°S 11.3°E	66.28	1935	Karl Gustav Jacob Jacobi (1804–1851)	WGPSN
Jansen	13.55°N 28.64°E	24.21	1935	Zacharias Janssen (1580–circa 1638)	WGPSN
Jansky	8.63°N 89.5°E	73.77	1964	Karl Jansky (1905–1950)	WGPSN
Janssen	44.96°S 40.82°E	200.65	1935	Pierre Jules César Janssen (1824–1907)	WGPSN
Jarvis	35.13°S 148.21°W	41.22	1988	Gregory Bruce Jarvis (1944–1986)	WGPSN
Jeans	55.58°S 91.51°E	81.13	1964	Sir James Hopwood Jeans (1877–1946)	WGPSN
Jehan	20.71°N 31.86°W	4.46	1976	(Persian male name)	WGPSN
Jenkins	0.37°N 78.04°E	37.77	1982	Louise Freeland Jenkins (1888–1970)	WGPSN
Jenner	42.01°S 95.98°E	73.66	1970	Edward Jenner (1749–1823)	WGPSN
Jerik	18.53°N 27.63°E	0.63	1976	(Scandinavian male name)	WGPSN
Joliot	25.79°N 93.39°E	172.79	1961	Frédéric Joliot-Curie (1900–1958)	WGPSN
Jomo	24.41°N 2.44°E	7.36	1979	(African male name)	WGPSN
José	12.68°S 1.66°W	1.22	1976	(Spanish male name)	WGPSN
Joule	27.15°N 144.14°W	97.52	1970	James Prescott Joule (1818–1889)	WGPSN
Joy	25.01°N 6.56°E	5.12	1973	Alfred Harrison Joy (1882–1973)	WGPSN
Jules Verne	34.85°S 147.28°E	145.54	1961	Jules Verne (1828–1905)	WGPSN
Julienne	26.06°N 3.13°E	1.8	1976	(French female name)	WGPSN
Julius Caesar	9.17°N 15.21°E	84.72	1935	Julius Caesar (circa 102–44 BC)	WGPSN

back to top

== K ==
Crater	Coordinates	Diameter (km)	Approval Year	Eponym	Ref
Kaiser	36.49°S 6.48°E	53.15	1935	Frederik Kaiser (1808–1872)	WGPSN
Kamerlingh Onnes	14.72°N 116.29°W	70.03	1970	Heike Kamerlingh Onnes (1853–1926)	WGPSN
Kane	62.99°N 25.84°E	54.96	1935	Elisha Kent Kane (1820–1857)	WGPSN
Kant	10.62°S 20.2°E	30.85	1935	Immanuel Kant (1724–1804)	WGPSN
Kao	6.71°S 87.81°E	34.54	1982	Ping-Tse Kao (1888–1970)	WGPSN
Kapteyn	10.79°S 70.59°E	48.65	1964	Jacobus C. Kapteyn (1851–1922)	WGPSN
Karima	25.93°S 102.98°E	3.05	1976	(Arabic female name)	WGPSN
Karpinskiy	72.61°N 166.8°E	91.4	1970	Alexander Petrovich Karpinsky (1846–1936)	WGPSN
Karrer	52.06°S 142.28°W	55.56	1979	Paul Karrer (1889–1971)	WGPSN
Kasper	8.3°N 122.12°E	12.39	1979	(Polish male name)	WGPSN
Kästner	6.9°S 78.94°E	116.07	1961	Abraham Gotthelf Kästner	WGPSN
Katchalsky	5.91°N 116.07°E	32.3	1973	Aharon Katzir-Katchalsky (1914–1972)	WGPSN
Kathleen	25.34°N 0.83°W	5.37	1976	(Irish female name)	WGPSN
Kearons	11.59°S 112.92°W	27.99	1970	William M. Kearons (es) (1878–1948)	WGPSN
Keeler	9.78°S 161.78°E	158.07	1970	James Edward Keeler (1857–1900)	WGPSN
Kekulé	16.31°N 138.47°W	94.22	1970	Friedrich August Kekulé von Stradonitz (1829–1896)	WGPSN
Keldysh	51.23°N 43.65°E	32.75	1982	Mstislav Vsevolodovich Keldysh (1911–1978)	WGPSN
Kepínski	28.63°N 126.72°E	31.67	1979	Felicjan Kępiński (1885–1966)	WGPSN
Kepler	8.12°N 38.01°W	29.49	1935	Johannes Kepler (1571–1630)	WGPSN
Khvolʹson	14.13°S 111.87°E	55.88	1970	Orest Daniilovich Khvolʹson (1852–1934)	WGPSN
Kibalʹchich	2.72°N 147.18°W	91.67	1970	Nikolai Ivanovich Kibalʹchich (1853–1881)	WGPSN
Kidinnu	35.79°N 122.95°E	55.1	1970	Kidinnu (c. 343 BC)	WGPSN
Kies	26.31°S 22.63°W	45.54	1935	Johann Kies (1713–1781)	WGPSN
Kiess	6.41°S 84.11°E	67.79	1973	Carl Clarence Kiess (1887–1967)	WGPSN
Kimura	56.82°S 118.38°E	27.44	1970	Hisashi Kimura (1870–1943)	WGPSN
Kinau	60.75°S 14.94°E	41.87	1935	Adolph Gottfried Kinau (1814–1887)	WGPSN
King	4.96°N 120.49°E	76.21	1970	Arthur Scott King (1876–1957) and Edward Skinner King (1861–1931)	WGPSN
Kira	17.71°S 132.83°E	6.81	1976	(Russian female name)	WGPSN
Kirch	39.27°N 5.62°W	11.71	1935	Gottfried Kirch (1639–1710)	WGPSN
Kircher	67.01°S 45.48°W	71.2	1935	Athanasius Kircher (1601–1680)	WGPSN
Kirchhoff	30.3°N 38.84°E	24.38	1935	Gustav Kirchhoff (1824–1887)	WGPSN
Kirkwood	68.34°N 156.66°W	68.12	1970	Daniel Kirkwood (1814–1895)	WGPSN
Klaproth	69.85°S 26.26°W	121.37	1935	Martin Heinrich Klaproth (1743–1817)	WGPSN
Klein	11.99°S 2.53°E	43.47	1935	Hermann Joseph Klein (1844–1914)	WGPSN
Kleymenov	32.48°S 140.36°W	55.98	1970	Ivan Terentyevich Kleymenov (1898–1938)	WGPSN
Klute	36.93°N 141.76°W	77.47	1970	Daniel O. Klute (1921–1964)	WGPSN
Knox-Shaw	5.36°N 80.19°E	13.44	1973	Harold Knox-Shaw (1885–1970)	WGPSN
Koch	42.13°S 150.33°E	94.7	1970	Robert Koch (1843–1910)	WGPSN
Kocher	84.47°S 134.02°W	24.03	2009	Emil Kocher (1841–1917)	WGPSN
Kohlschütter	14.24°N 153.95°E	56.25	1970	Arnold Kohlschütter (1883–1969)	WGPSN
Kolhörster	10.79°N 115.01°W	78.78	1970	Werner Kolhörster (1887–1946)	WGPSN
Kolya	38.3°N 35°W	0.1	2012	Russian male name	WGPSN
Komarov	24.59°N 152.25°E	80.43	1970	Vladimir M. Komarov (1927–1967)	WGPSN
Kondratyuk	15.33°S 115.8°E	97.97	1970	Yurij V. Kondratyuk (1897–1942)	WGPSN
König	24.23°S 24.68°W	22.86	1935	Rudolf König (1865–1927)	WGPSN
Konoplev	28.16°S 124.37°W	27.67	1991	Boris Konoplev (1912–1960)	WGPSN
Konstantinov	19.56°N 158.34°E	68.08	1970	Konstantin Ivanovich Konstantinov (1817–1871)	WGPSN
Kopff	17.39°S 89.68°W	40.49	1970	August Kopff (1882–1960)	WGPSN
Korolev	4.19°S 157.41°W	423.41	1970	Sergei P. Korolev (1906–1966)	WGPSN
Kosberg	20.19°S 149.61°E	14.63	1976	Semyon Ariyevich Kosberg (1903–1965)	WGPSN
Kostinskiy	14.43°N 118.85°E	67.91	1970	Sergey K. Kostinskiy (1867–1937)	WGPSN
Kostya	38.3°N 35°W	0.2	2012	Russian male name	WGPSN
Kovalʹskiy	21.89°S 101.03°E	44.97	1970	Marian Albertovich Kovalʹskiy (1821–1884)	WGPSN
Kovalevskaya	30.86°N 129.44°W	113.71	1970	Sofia V. Kovalevskaya (1850–1891)	WGPSN
Kozyrev	46.64°S 129.59°E	59.35	1997	Nikolay Alexandrovich Kozyrev (1908–1983)	WGPSN
Krafft	16.56°N 72.72°W	51.15	1935	Wolfgang Ludwig Krafft (1743–1814)	WGPSN
Kramarov	2.29°S 98.89°W	21.05	1991	Grigory Moiseevich Kramarov (1887–1970)	WGPSN
Kramers	53.28°N 127.98°W	61.59	1970	Hendrik Anthony Kramers (1894–1952)	WGPSN
Krasnov	29.93°S 79.82°W	41.17	1964	Aleksander V. Krasnov (1866–1907)	WGPSN
Krasovskiy	3.79°N 175.63°W	61.67	1970	Feodosiy N. Krasovskiy (1878–1948)	WGPSN
Kreiken	9.05°S 84.55°E	29.37	1973	Edberg Adrian Kreiken (1896–1964)	WGPSN
Krieger	29.02°N 45.61°W	22.87	1935	Johann Nepomuk Krieger (1865–1902)	WGPSN
Krogh	9.41°N 65.69°E	19.17	1976	Schack August Steenberg Krogh (1874–1949)	WGPSN
Krusenstern	26.3°S 5.76°E	46.44	1935	Baron von Adam Johann Krusenstern (1770–1846)	WGPSN
Krylov	35.26°N 166.11°W	49.83	1970	Alexei Krylov (1863–1945)	WGPSN
Kugler	53.44°S 104.1°E	65.87	1970	Franz Xaver Kugler (1862–1929)	WGPSN
Kuhn	84.48°S 152.48°W	16.61	2009	Richard Kuhn (1900–1967)	WGPSN
Kuiper	9.78°S 22.68°W	6.28	1976	Gerard Peter Kuiper (1905–1973)	WGPSN
Kulik	41.98°N 154.63°W	60.46	1970	Leonid Alekseevich Kulik (1883–1942)	WGPSN
Kundt	11.57°S 11.57°W	10.31	1976	August Kundt (1839–1894)	WGPSN
Kunowsky	3.22°N 32.53°W	18.27	1935	Georg Karl Friedrich Kunowsky (1786–1846)	WGPSN
Kuo Shou Ching	8.1°N 134.66°W	33.48	1970	Kuo Shou Ching (1231–1316)	WGPSN
Kurchatov	38.3°N 141.74°E	110.96	1961	Igorʹ Vasilʹevich Kurchatov (1903–1960)	WGPSN

back to top
