= Kuhn (crater) =

Crater on the Moon

- Coordinates: 84.6°S 153.6°W
- Diameter: 16 km
- Depth: 1.46 km (0.91 mi)
- Eponym: Richard Kuhn

Kuhn is a lunar impact crater located on the lunar far side near the Northern lunar pole. The crater is located east of the Kocher crater, southeast of the prominent Ashbrook crater and just north of the southern lunar pole. Kuhn was adopted and named after German chemist Richard Kuhn by the IAU in 2008.
