= Kearons (crater) =

Crater on the Moon

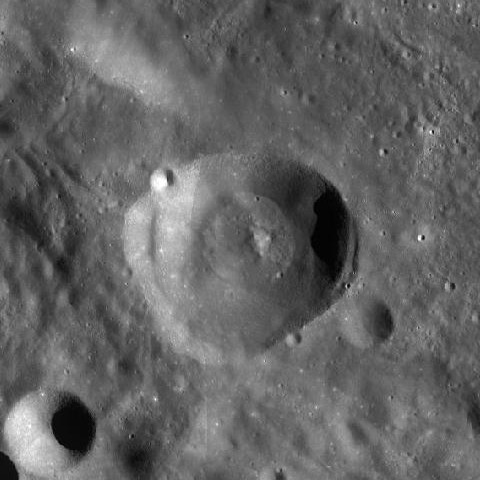
- LRO WAC image
- Coordinates: 11.4°S 112.6°W
- Diameter: 23 km
- Depth: Unknown
- Colongitude: 113° at sunrise
- Eponym: William M. Kearons (es)

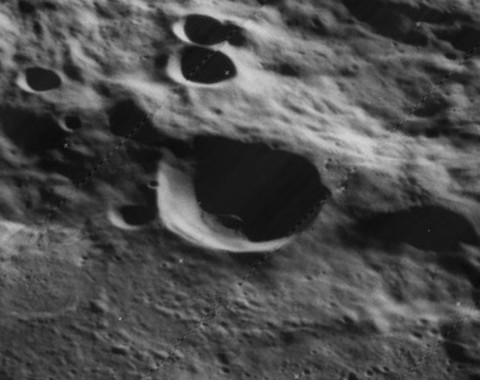
Oblique Lunar Orbiter 5 image, facing southwest

Kearons is a small lunar impact crater that is located on the far side of the Moon, to the northwest of the Mare Orientale impact basin, in the outer skirt of ejecta that surrounds the Montes Cordillera range. It is a relatively isolated crater, possibly because any nearby features have been buried under the ejecta. Some distance to the south is the crater Lewis, and to the north-northeast lies Grachev.

The rim of this crater forms a rounded polygon, with a sharp edge that has a small craterlet across the northwestern side. The inner wall and interior floor are relatively featureless. About a crater diameter to the southwest of Kearons is a smaller crater that has a modest ray system, with rays extending to the north, south, and southwest for up to 100 km.

This crater is named after William M. Kearons (1878-August 13, 1948), an American amateur astronomer who was notable for his photographs of the Sun. He was a minister at the Saint Luke's Episcopal Church in Fall River, Massachusetts.

== Satellite craters ==
By convention these features are identified on lunar maps by placing the letter on the side of the crater midpoint that is closest to Kearons.

Kearons	Latitude	Longitude	Diameter
U	10.5° S	115.9° W	13 km
