= Hevesy (crater) =

Lunar crater

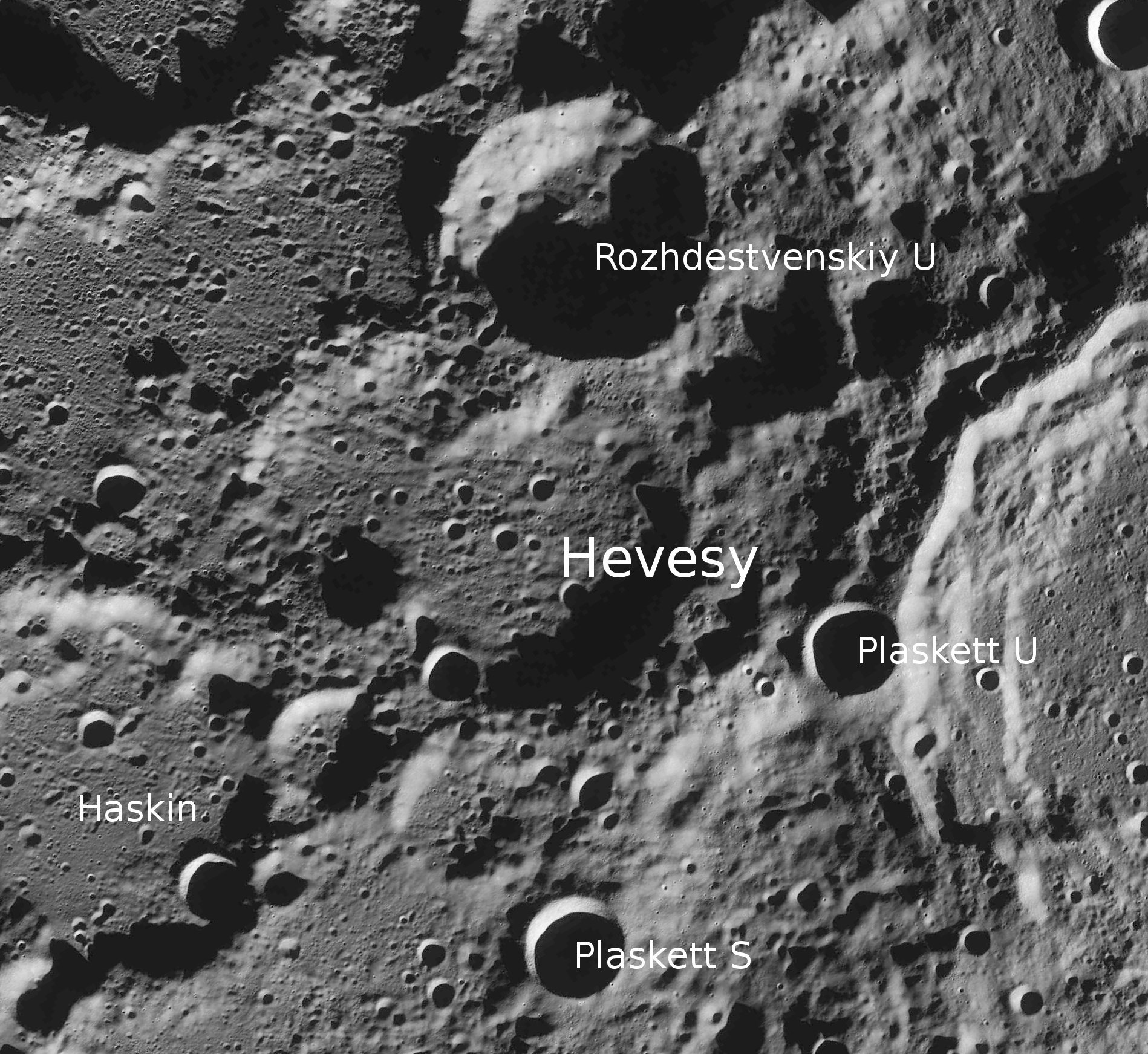
- Coordinates: 83.1°N 150.1°E
- Diameter: 49.5 km
- Eponym: George de Hevesy

Hevesy is a lunar impact crater located on the lunar far side near the northern pole. The crater is located in between craters Plaskett and Haskin. The large Rozhdestvenskiy crater is located to the Northeast. Hevesy was adopted and named after Hungarian chemist George de Hevesy by the IAU in 2009.
