= Kuo Shou Ching (crater) =

Crater on the Moon

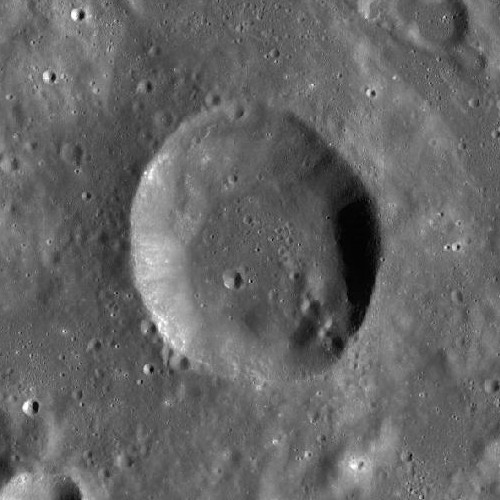
- LRO WAC image
- Coordinates: 8.4°N 133.7°W
- Diameter: 34 km
- Depth: Unknown
- Colongitude: 135° at sunrise
- Eponym: Kuo Shou Ching

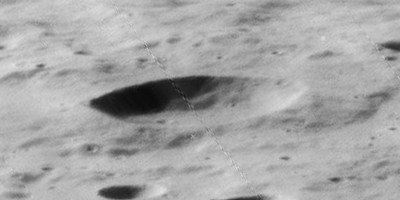
Lunar Orbiter 5 image

Kuo Shou Ching is a small lunar impact crater that is located in the northwestern part of the walled plain named Hertzsprung, on the far side of the Moon. This is an oval-shaped crater that is elongated along the north–south axis. The rim edge is well-defined and not noticeably eroded. The inner walls are simple slopes that descend to the interior floor.
