= Lucretius (crater) =

Crater on the Moon

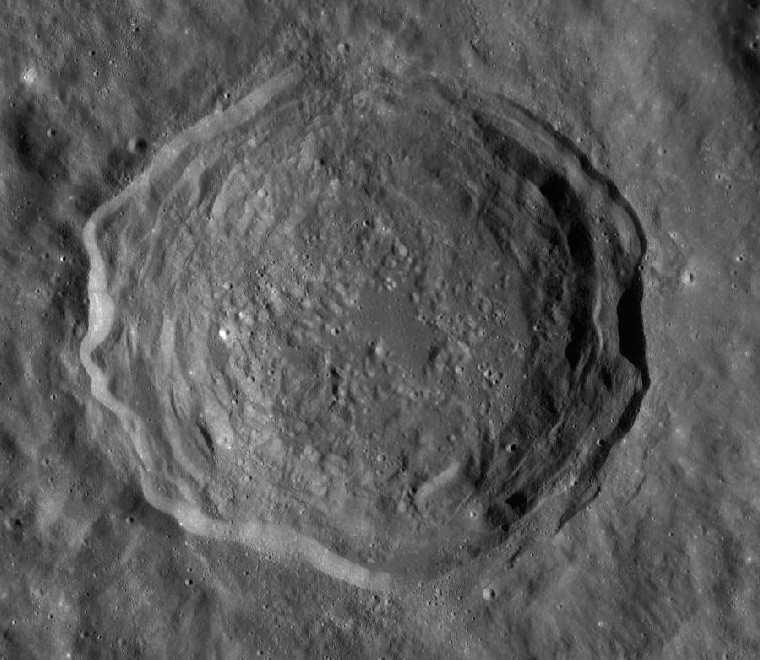
- LRO WAC image
- Coordinates: 8.2°S 120.8°W
- Diameter: 63 km
- Depth: Unknown
- Colongitude: 122° at sunrise
- Eponym: Lucretius

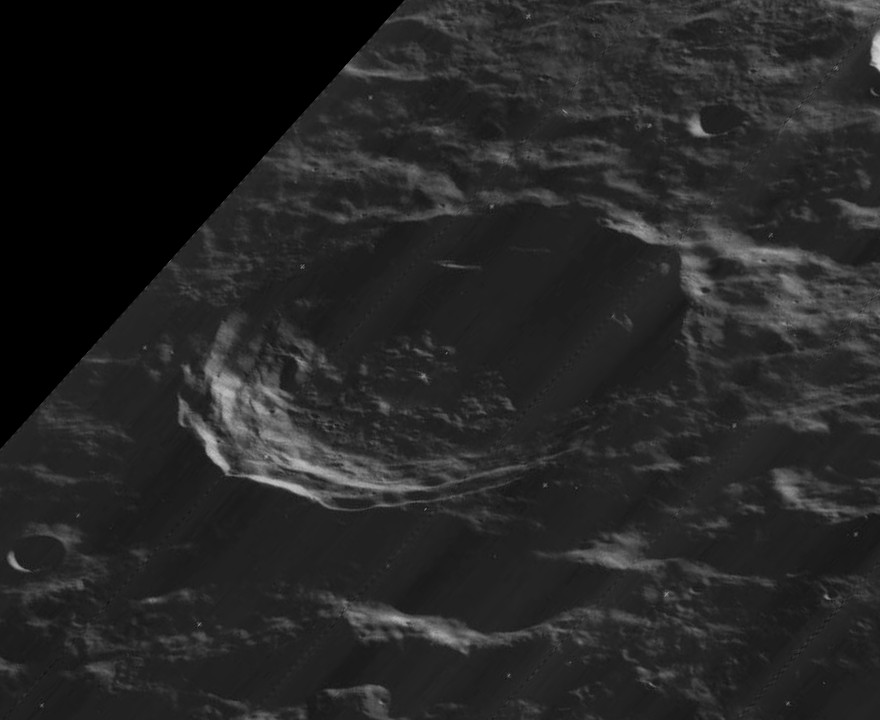
A view of Lucretius from Lunar Orbiter 5, facing west

Lucretius is an impact crater on the far side of the Moon. It is located to the southeast of a huge walled plain called Hertzsprung, within the outer skirt of ejecta that surrounds that impact feature. To the southwest of Lucretius lies Fridman.

This crater is a relatively fresh impact, as the formation is well-defined and the rim and interior remain nearly unscathed from impact erosion. The rim has an outward bulge along the western side, so that it is slightly wider in longitude than latitude. The inner walls display some terrace structures, and the interior floor is somewhat uneven in places.

To the northwest of Lucretius is a chain of craters called the Catena Lucretius. These extend for a distance of 271 km across the southern floor of Hertzsprung, and include a number of craters ranging up to 15–20 km in diameter.

== Satellite craters ==
By convention these features are identified on lunar maps by placing the letter on the side of the crater midpoint that is closest to Lucretius.

Lucretius	Latitude	Longitude	Diameter
C	3.7° S	114.4° W	20 km
U	7.7° S	123.6° W	24 km
