= Grigg (crater) =

Lunar impact crater

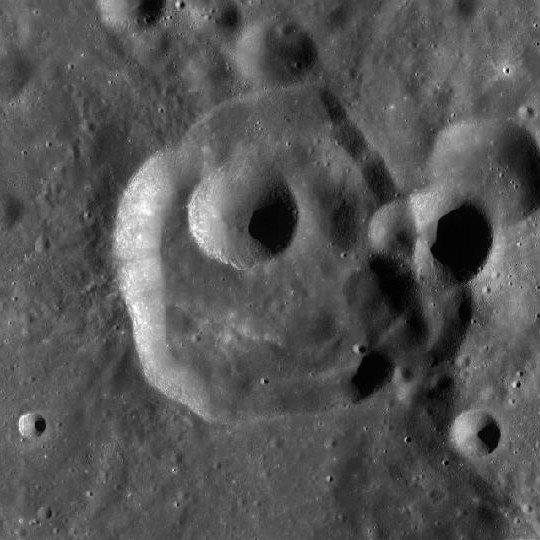
- LRO WAC image
- Coordinates: 12.5°N 130.13°W
- Diameter: 36 km
- Depth: Unknown
- Colongitude: 130° at sunrise
- Eponym: John Grigg

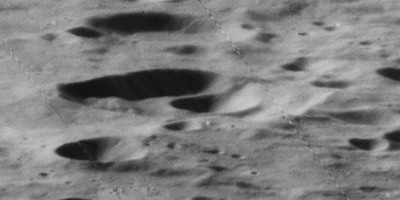
Lunar Orbiter 5 image

Grigg is a lunar impact crater that is located on the far side of the Moon. It lies in the northern outskirts of the huge walled plain Hertzsprung, to the southwest of the crater Fersman and southeast of Poynting. The rim of this crater is generally circular, with a small impact crater intruding into the eastern edge. A small crater fills the northwestern part of the interior floor. The infrared spectrum of pure crystalline plagioclase has been identified on the central floor.

Grigg was named after New Zealand astronomer John Grigg by the IAU in 1970.

== Satellite craters ==
By convention these features are identified on lunar maps by placing the letter on the side of the crater midpoint that is closest to Grigg.

Grigg	Coordinates	Diameter, km
E	13.51°N 125.68°W	10.4
P	10.52°N 131.59°W	30.0
