= Haidinger (crater) =

Crater on the Moon

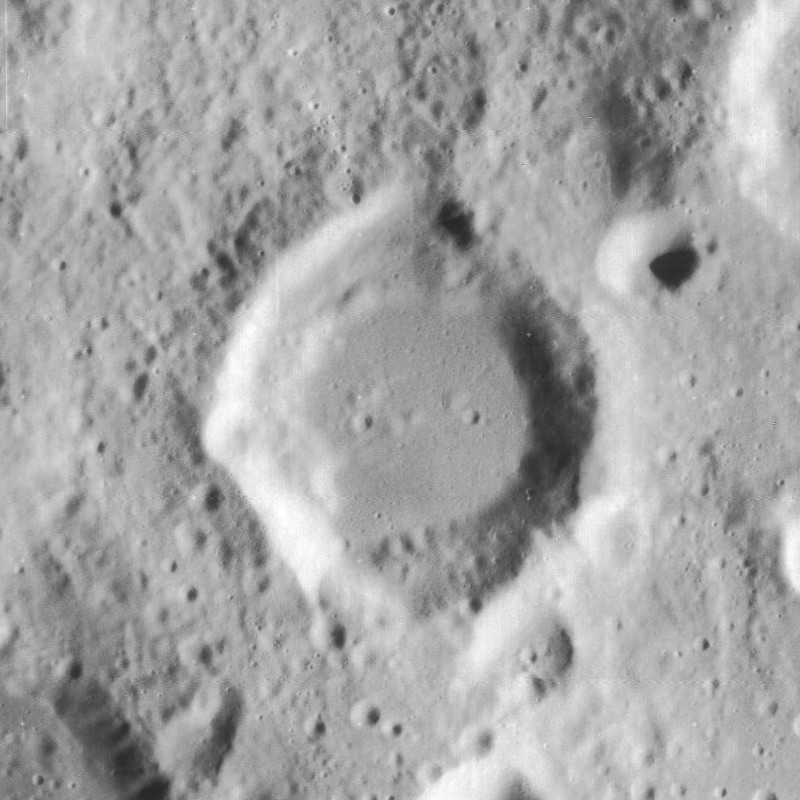
- Lunar Orbiter 4 image
- Coordinates: 39.2°S 25.0°W
- Diameter: 22 km
- Depth: 2.3 km
- Colongitude: 25° at sunrise
- Eponym: Wilhelm von Haidinger

Haidinger is a lunar impact crater that is located in the southwestern part of the Moon. It was named after Austrian geologist Wilhelm von Haidinger. Just to the southwest of the crater is the small lunar mare named Lacus Timoris. Haidinger lies northwest of the crater Wilhelm and east of the irregular formation Hainzel.

The outer rim of this crater is nearly circular, with slight outward bulges along the western and northeastern parts of the rim. The satellite crater Haidinger B is attached to the exterior of the eastern rim, and Haidinger A lies close to the northeastern rim. There is a small crater-like divot along the southern inner wall. The interior floor has a low ridge in the northern half.

== Satellite craters ==
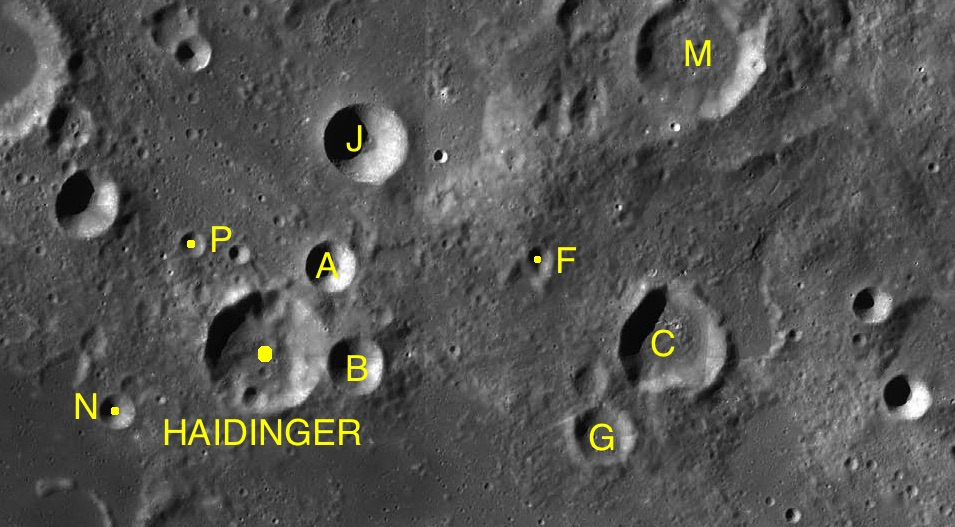
Haidinger and its satellite craters

By convention these features are identified on lunar maps by placing the letter on the side of the crater midpoint that is closest to Haidinger.

Haidinger	Latitude	Longitude	Diameter
A	38.6° S	24.6° W	9 km
B	39.2° S	24.4° W	11 km
C	39.0° S	22.1° W	19 km
F	38.7° S	23.1° W	5 km
G	39.6° S	22.6° W	11 km
J	37.9° S	24.4° W	15 km
M	37.4° S	22.0° W	23 km
N	39.4° S	26.1° W	6 km
P	38.5° S	25.6° W	4 km
