= Zeeman (crater) =

Lunar surface depression

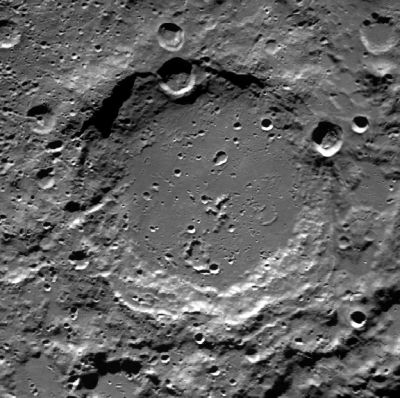
- Clementine mosaic
- Coordinates: 75.2°S 134.8°W
- Diameter: 184 km
- Depth: Unknown
- Colongitude: 135° at sunrise
- Formation: Nectarian
- Eponym: Pieter Zeeman

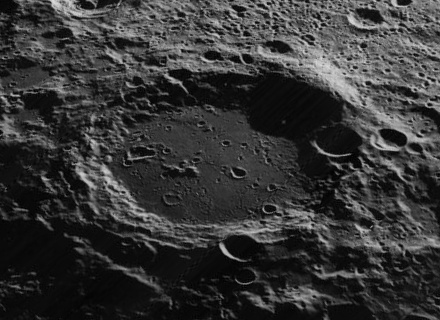
Oblique Lunar Orbiter 5 image, facing west

Zeeman is a lunar impact crater located on the far side of the Moon near its south pole. It is not directly visible from the Earth. To the northwest of Zeeman lies the crater Numerov. Southeast of the rim is the crater Ashbrook.

On the lunar geologic timescale, this formation dates to the Nectarian period. The outer rim of Zeeman is eroded somewhat irregularly, with considerable variation in width of the inner slopes. The crater Zeeman Y lies across the northern wall, reaching almost to the relatively flat interior floor. In the western rim is a small crater that joins a gash that runs down to the floor. The surface of the interior is pock-marked by many tiny craterlets, and worn crater features. There is a low central rise, offset to the southeast of the interior midpoint. The infrared spectrum of pure crystalline plagioclase has been identified on this peak.

An unusual, (officially) unnamed massif is present in the northwest section of the rim, which rises about 4.0 km above adjacent parts of the rim and about 7.57 km above the crater floor. The formation of the massif does not appear to be explainable simply on the basis of the impact that created the crater.

== Satellite craters ==
By convention these features are identified on lunar maps by placing the letter on the side of the crater midpoint that is closest to Zeeman.

Zeeman	Latitude	Longitude	Diameter
E	74.2° S	123.9° W	29 km
G	74.3° S	107.4° W	45 km
U	73.8° S	148.2° W	26 km
X	71.5° S	138.1° W	26 km
Y	72.8° S	137.6° W	33 km

== Conspiracy theories ==
There have been claims that a rectangular shape located on the Zeeman crater is an alien structure and that it was evidence of "foul play at the US Government". The Clementine Conspiracy or Project Golden Dragon is a conspiracy theory that started as a result of the Clementine mission. It posed that located within the Zeeman crater there is an alien machine or a weapon developed by the US government.
