= Michelson (crater) =

Crater on the Moon

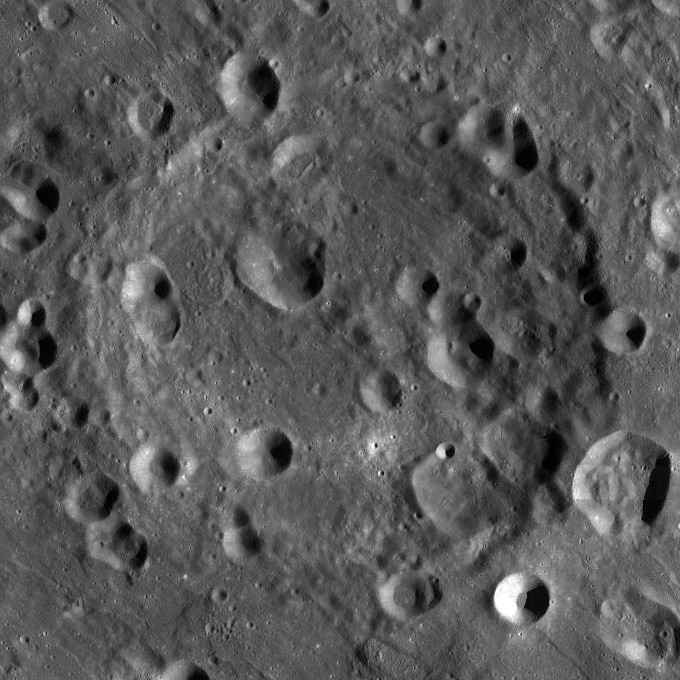
- LRO WAC image
- Coordinates: 7.2°N 120.7°W
- Diameter: 123 km
- Depth: Unknown
- Colongitude: 121° at sunrise
- Eponym: Albert A. Michelson

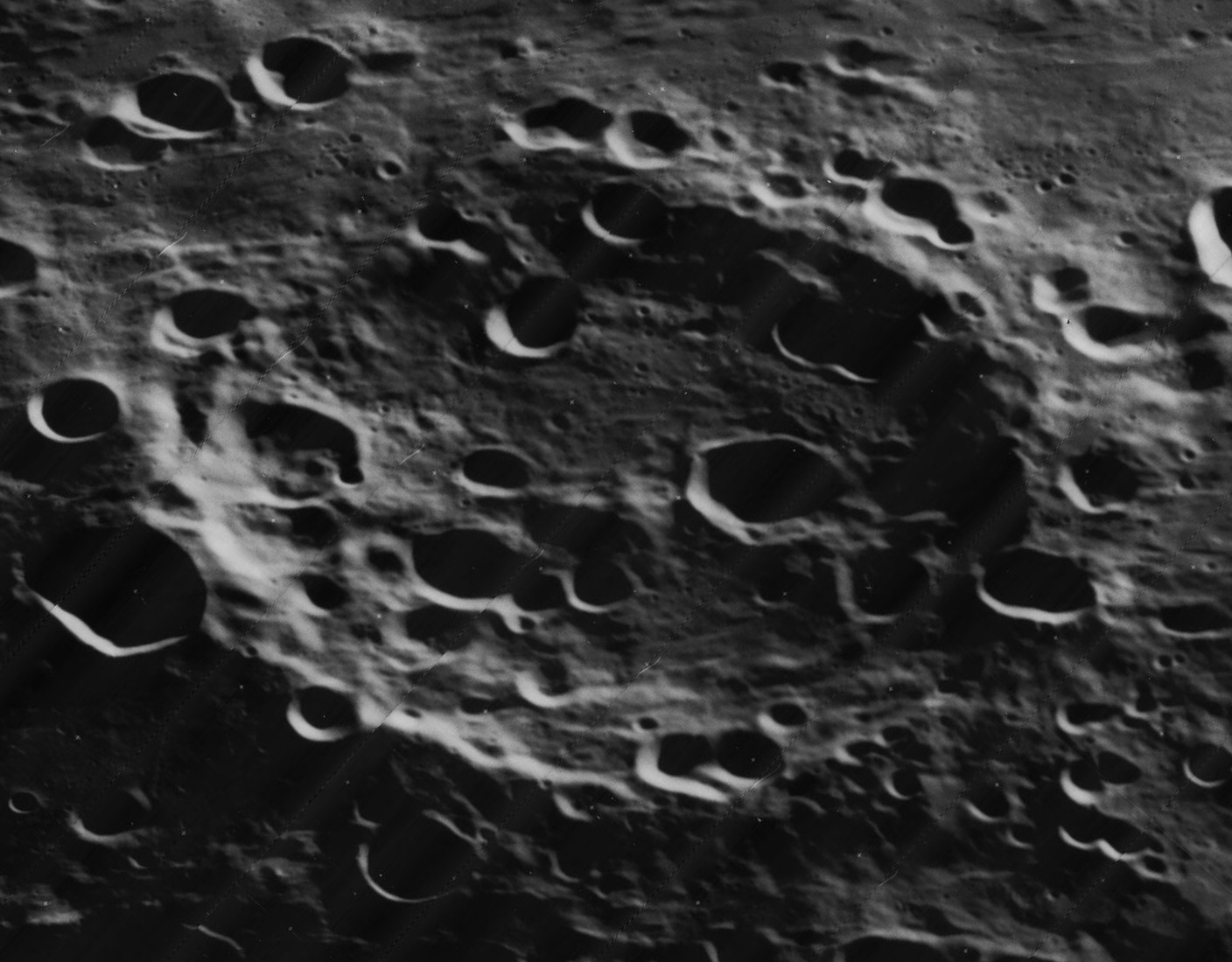
A view of Michelson from Lunar Orbiter 5, facing west

Michelson is a crater on the far side of the Moon. It lies along the northeastern outer rim of a huge walled plain called Hertzsprung, and to the southwest of the crater Kolhörster.

This is a heavily eroded crater formation with multiple impacts along the rim edge and within the interior. The rim is roughly circular, but has been rendered relatively uneven due to these smaller craters. There are small craters across the interior floor, including impacts along the northern, western and southeastern edges. The infrared spectrum of pure crystalline plagioclase has been identified on the southwest floor.

To the southeast of the outer rim is a crater chain that has been designated Catena Michelson. This feature is radial to the Mare Orientale impact basin, and passes near the outer rim of the crater Grachev.

== Satellite craters ==
By convention these features are identified on lunar maps by placing the letter on the side of the crater midpoint that is closest to Michelson.

Michelson	Latitude	Longitude	Diameter
G	5.7° N	118.8° W	27 km
H	4.6° N	116.8° W	35 km
V	8.0° N	124.4° W	20 km
W	7.5° N	121.3° W	25 km
