= Werner Kolhörster =

German physicist

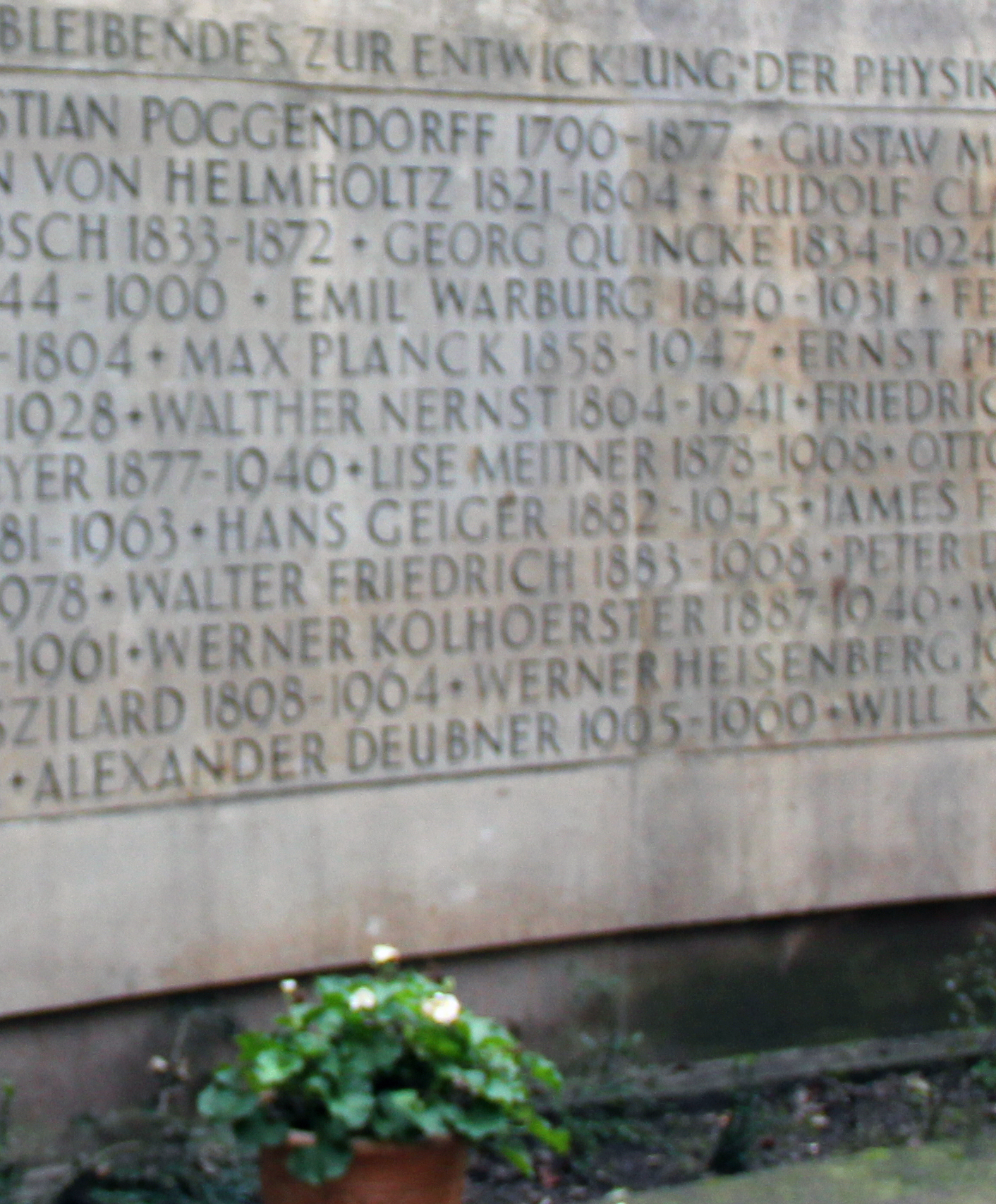
Werner Kolhörster on the memorial stone Invalidenstraße, Berlin (row 3 from below)

Werner Heinrich Gustav Kolhörster (28 December 1887 – 5 August 1946) was a German physicist and a pioneer of research into cosmic rays.

Kolhörster was born in Schwiebus (Świebodzin), Brandenburg Province of Prussia. While attending the University of Halle, he studied physics under Friedrich Ernst Dorn.

Repeating the cosmic ray experiments of Victor Hess, in 1913-14 Kolhörster ascended by balloon to an altitude of 9 km, where he confirmed Hess' result that the ionization rate from cosmic rays was greater at that altitude than at sea level. This was evidence that the source for these ionizing rays came from above the Earth's atmosphere.

Kolhörster continued his physics studies at the Physikalisch-Technische Reichsanstalt in Berlin, beginning in 1914. During World War I he made measurements of atmospheric electricity in Turkey. Following the war he became a teacher. He joined the Physikalisch-Technische Reichsanstalt in 1922.

In 1928–29, Walter Bothe and Kolhörster used the Geiger-Muller detector to demonstrate that cosmic rays were actually charged particles. The ability of these particles to penetrate the Earth's atmosphere meant that they must be highly energetic.

In 1930, Kolhörster started the first institute for the study of cosmic rays in Potsdam, with financial assistance from the Prussian Academy of Sciences. He became director of the Institut für Hohenstrahlungsforschung in Berlin-Dahlem in 1935, where he was appointed an ordinary professor.

Kolhörster was killed in a car crash in Munich. The crater Kolhörster on the Moon is named in his memory.
