= Kinau (crater) =

Crater on the Moon

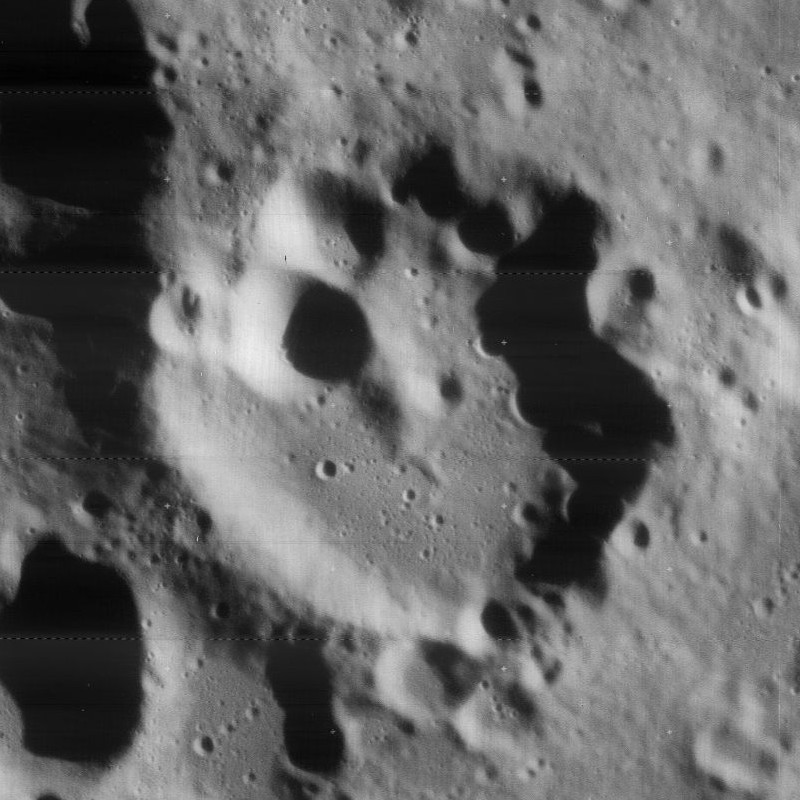
- Lunar Orbiter 4 image
- Coordinates: 60.8°S 15.1°E
- Diameter: 42 km
- Depth: 2.0 km
- Colongitude: 346° at sunrise
- Eponym: Adolph Gottfried Kinau

Kinau is a small, eroded lunar impact crater that is located in the low southern latitudes of the Moon. It lies to the southeast of the crater Jacobi, and about equally far to the north-northwest of Pentland. It is 42 kilometers in diameter and two kilometers deep. It may be from the Pre-Nectarian period, 4.55 to 3.85 billion years ago.

The northwestern rim and inner wall of this crater has been heavily damaged by impacts, and is overlaid by a pair of small, cup-shaped craters. The remainder of the rim is worn and somewhat distorted into a hexagonal shape, with several small craterlets along the rim edge. The inner walls are relatively low, and the interior floor is almost featureless except for a few tiny craterlets. There is a low rise near the midpoint that is attached to the small crater to the northwest.

The crater is named after 19th century German priest, teacher and amateur astronomer Adolph Gottfried Kinau.

== Satellite craters ==
By convention these features are identified on Lunar maps by placing the letter on the side of the crater midpoint that is closest to Kinau.

Kinau	Latitude	Longitude	Diameter
A	62.1° S	20.0° E	35 km
B	61.6° S	19.2° E	8 km
C	60.6° S	20.5° E	30 km
D	60.6° S	18.5° E	27 km
E	60.1° S	20.0° E	7 km
F	62.1° S	13.5° E	10 km
G	61.5° S	12.7° E	25 km
H	59.8° S	19.7° E	6 km
J	59.6° S	16.0° E	5 km
K	58.6° S	18.1° E	10 km
L	59.3° S	18.8° E	11 km
M	60.4° S	14.3° E	12 km
N	61.4° S	15.5° E	7 km
P	61.4° S	17.4° E	5 km
Q	62.4° S	21.1° E	11 km
R	59.9° S	11.6° E	61 km

== Notes ==
1. The botanist C.A. Kinau was struck from the official list of the USGS in April 2007 and replaced by the correct eponym Adolph Gottfried Kinau.
