= Drygalski (crater) =

Lunar surface depression

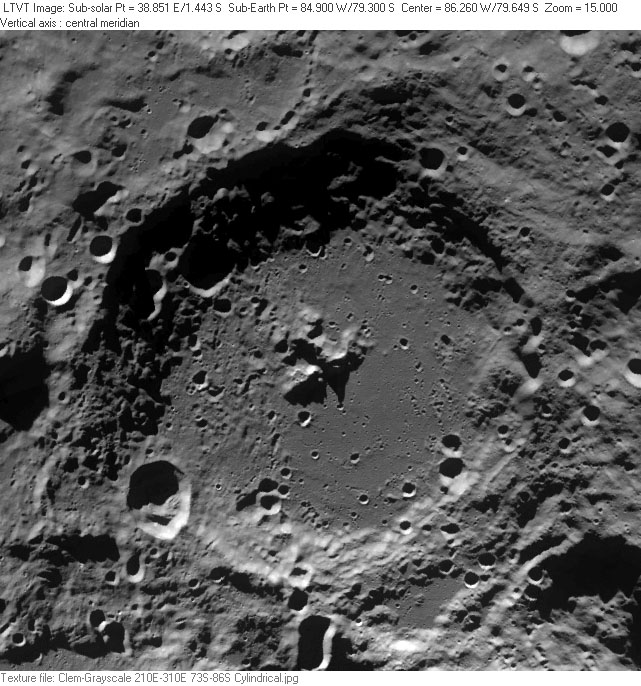
- Clementine mosaic
- Coordinates: 79.3°S 84.9°W
- Diameter: 162.49 km (100.97 mi)
- Depth: 4.0 km
- Colongitude: 102° at sunrise
- Formation: Pre-Nectarian
- Eponym: Erich D. Von Drygalski

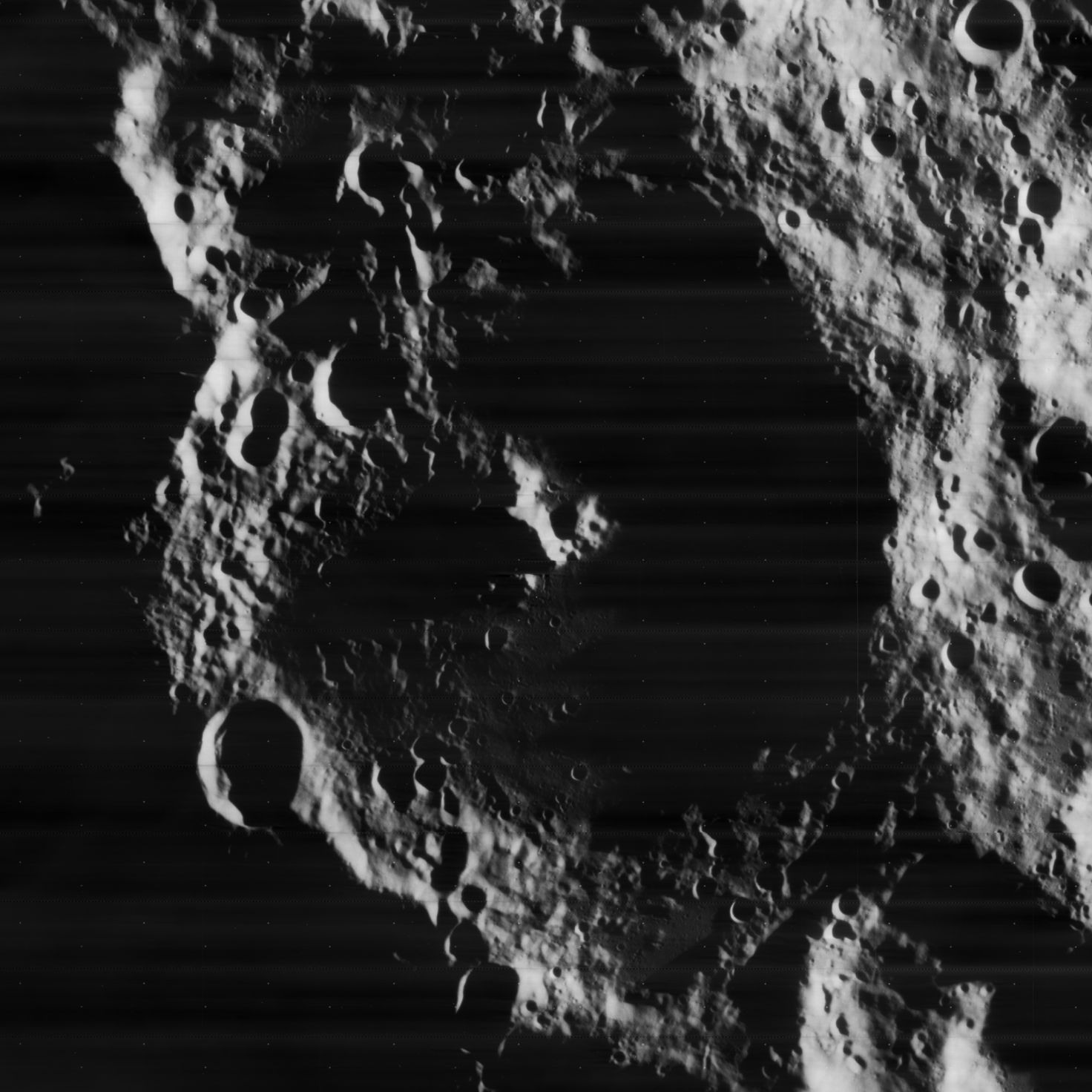
Lunar Orbiter 4 image

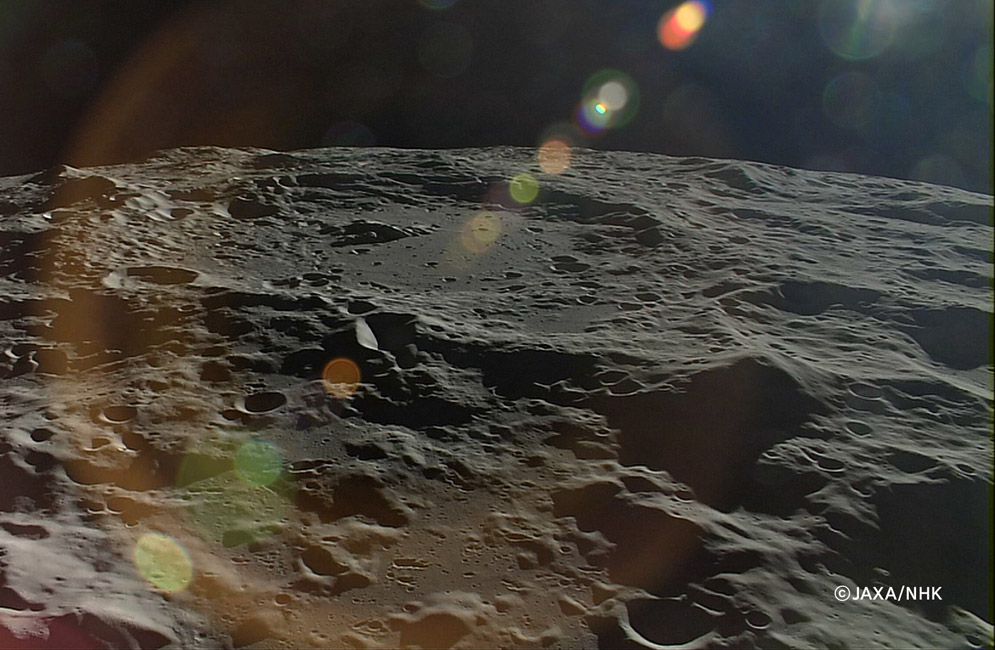
Oblique Kaguya image

Drygalski is a large lunar impact crater that lies along the southern limb of the Moon. It partly overlies the crater Ashbrook to the west on the far side of the Moon. Just to the north of Drygalski is the smaller Boltzmann. The location of this crater restricts its observation from the Earth, and even under conditions of favorable libration it is viewed from the edge. It is only illuminated by the Sun at an oblique angle, and it lies close to the south polar craters that are permanently shielded from sunlight.

On the lunar geologic timescale, Drygalski dates to the Pre-Nectarian period. The outer rim of this crater has been worn and eroded by subsequent impacts, leaving a rugged, mountainous ring that is overlaid in places by small craters. The most notable of these are Drygalski P across the southwest rim where it joins Ashbrook, and Drygalski V along the north-northwest inner wall. There is a small catena, or crater chain, beginning tangentially the northern outer rim then arcing to the north towards Boltzmann. To the south is an odd formation of two or more small craters, forming a short valley.

Portions of the interior floor within the inner walls is flat and level, having been resurfaced by lava. The flattest parts are in the southern and eastern sections of the interior. The surface is more rugged in the west, and is marked by several small craterlets. At the midpoint of the interior is a rugged central peak formation with several smaller ridges along the flanks. The infrared spectrum of pure crystalline plagioclase has been identified on this peak.

This crater is named after German geographer and geophysicist Erich D. Von Drygalski (1865–1949). His name was initially introduced into lunar nomenclature by Philipp J. H. Fauth. It was later restored by David W. G. Arthur and Ewen Whitaker with the Rectified Lunar Atlas (1963). Its designation was formally adopted by the International Astronomical Union in 1964.

== Satellite craters ==
By convention these features are identified on lunar maps by placing the letter on the side of the crater midpoint that is closest to Drygalski.

Drygalski	Latitude	Longitude	Diameter
P	81.0° S	99.9° W	30 km
V	78.5° S	93.4° W	21 km

The following craters have been renamed by the IAU.

- Drygalski Q — See Ashbrook.
