= Hinshelwood (crater) =

Lunar crater

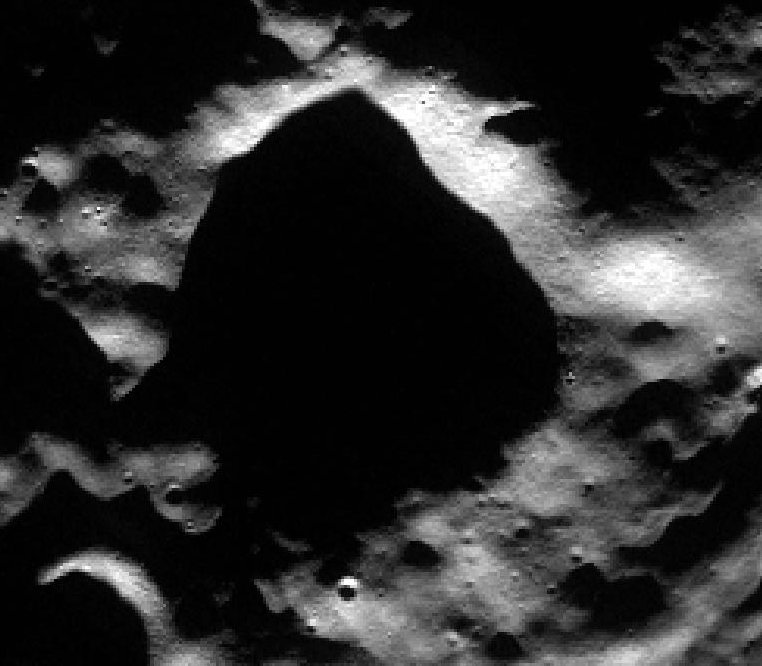
- Coordinates: 89.3°N 46.3°W
- Diameter: 14.2 km
- Eponym: Cyril Norman Hinshelwood

Hinshelwood is a lunar crater located on the lunar near side near the lunar north pole. The crater is located in between the large craters Peary and Hermite, just south of the pole. The crater was adopted and named after English chemist Sir Cyril Norman Hinshelwood by the IAU in 2009.

Hinshelwood is deformed, and its rim contains unique radial structures caused by the shockwave and gas cloud of the impact which created the crater. The southern rim of Hinshelwood, which points towards the lunar equator, receives a relatively high level of light, making it a potential landing site for future lunar exploration.
