= George de Hevesy =

Hungarian radiochemist (1885–1966)

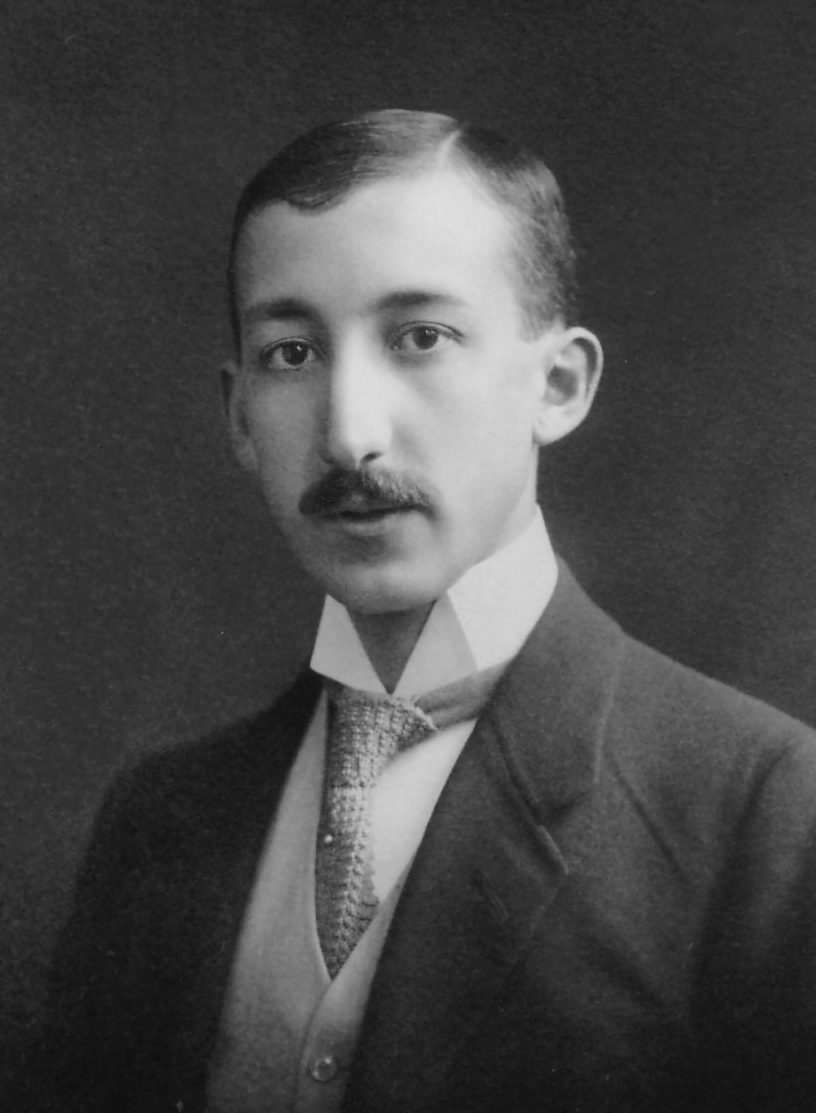
- Hevesy, c. 1913
- Born: György Bischitz; 1 August 1885; Budapest, Kingdom of Hungary
- Died: 5 July 1966 (aged 80); Freiburg, West Germany
- Resting place: Kerepesi Cemetery, Budapest
- Other name: Georg Karl von Hevesy
- Citizenship: Hungary; Germany
- Education: University of Budapest; Technische Universität Berlin; University of Freiburg
- Known for: Hafnium; Radioactive tracer; Neutron activation analysis
- Spouse: Pia Riis (m. 1924)
- Children: 4
- Parents: Lajos Bischitz (father); Eugénia Schossberger (mother)
- Awards: Nobel Prize for Chemistry (1943); Copley Medal (1949); Faraday Lectureship Prize (1950); Atoms for Peace Award (1958); Niels Bohr International Gold Medal (1961)
- Scientific career
- Fields: Chemistry; Radiochemistry
- Institutions: Ghent University; University of Budapest; Niels Bohr Institute, University of Copenhagen; ETH Zürich; University of Freiburg; University of Manchester; Stefan Meyer Institute for Subatomic Physics
- Doctoral advisor: Georg Franz Julius Meyer
- Other academic advisors: Fritz Haber; Ernest Rutherford
- Doctoral students: Rolf Hosemann; Johann Böhm
- Other notable students: Erika Cremer (postdoc)

George Charles de Hevesy (born György Bischitz; Hungarian: Hevesy György Károly; German: Georg Karl von Hevesy; 1 August 1885 – 5 July 1966) was a Hungarian radiochemist and Nobel Prize in Chemistry laureate, recognized in 1943 for his key role in the development of radioactive tracers to study chemical processes such as in the metabolism of animals. He also co-discovered the element hafnium.

== Biography ==
=== Early years ===
Hevesy György was born in Budapest, Hungary, to a wealthy and ennobled family of Hungarian-Jewish descent, the fifth of eight children to his parents Lajos Bischitz and Baroness Eugénia (Jenny) Schossberger (ennobled as "De Tornya"). Grandparents from both sides of the family had provided the presidents of the Jewish community of Pest. George grew up in Budapest and graduated high school in 1903 from Piarist Gimnázium. The family's name in 1904 was Hevesy-Bischitz, and Hevesy later changed his own.

De Hevesy began his studies in chemistry at the University of Budapest for one year, and at the Technische Hochschule in Charlottenburg (now Technische Universität Berlin) for several months, but transferred to the University of Freiburg. There he met Ludwig Gattermann. In 1906, he started his Ph.D. thesis with Georg Franz Julius Meyer, acquiring his doctorate in physics in 1908. In 1908, Hevesy was offered a position at the ETH Zürich, Switzerland, yet being independently wealthy, he was able to choose his research environment. He worked first with Fritz Haber in Karlsruhe, Germany, then with Ernest Rutherford in Manchester, England, where he also met Niels Bohr. Back at home in Budapest, he was appointed professor in physical chemistry in 1918. In 1920, he settled in Copenhagen.

=== Research ===
In 1922, de Hevesy co-discovered (with Dirk Coster) the element hafnium (_{72}Hf) (Latin Hafnia for "Copenhagen", the home town of Niels Bohr). Mendeleev's 1869 periodic table arranged the chemical elements into a logical system, but a chemical element with 72 protons was missing. Hevesy determined to look for that element on the basis of Bohr's atomic model. The mineralogical museum of Norway and Greenland in Copenhagen furnished the material for the research. Characteristic X-ray spectra recordings made of the sample indicated that a new element was present. The accepted account has been disputed by Mansel Davies and Eric Scerri who attribute the prediction that element 72 would be a transition element to the chemist Charles Bury.

Supported financially by the Rockefeller Foundation, Hevesy had a very productive year. He developed the X-ray fluorescence analytical method, and discovered the samarium alpha-ray. It was here he began the use of radioactive isotopes in studying the metabolic processes of plants and animals, by tracing chemicals in the body by replacing part of stable isotopes with small quantities of the radioactive isotopes. In 1923, Hevesy published the first study on the use of the naturally radioactive ^{212}Pb as radioactive tracer to follow the absorption and translocation in the roots, stems and leaves of Vicia faba, also known as the broad bean. Later, in 1943, the work on radioactive tracing would earn Hevesy the Nobel Prize in Chemistry.

In 1924, Hevesy returned to Freiburg as Professor of Physical Chemistry. In 1930, he went to Cornell University, Ithaca as Baker Lecturer. In 1934, after the Nazis came to power in Germany, he returned to Niels Bohr's Institute at the University of Copenhagen. In 1936, he invented Neutron Activation Analysis. In 1943 he fled to Stockholm (Sweden being neutral during the war), where was he an associate of the Institute of Research in Organic Chemistry. In 1949 he was elected Franqui Professor in the University of Ghent. In his retirement, he remained an active scientific associate of the Stockholm University.

== World War II and beyond ==
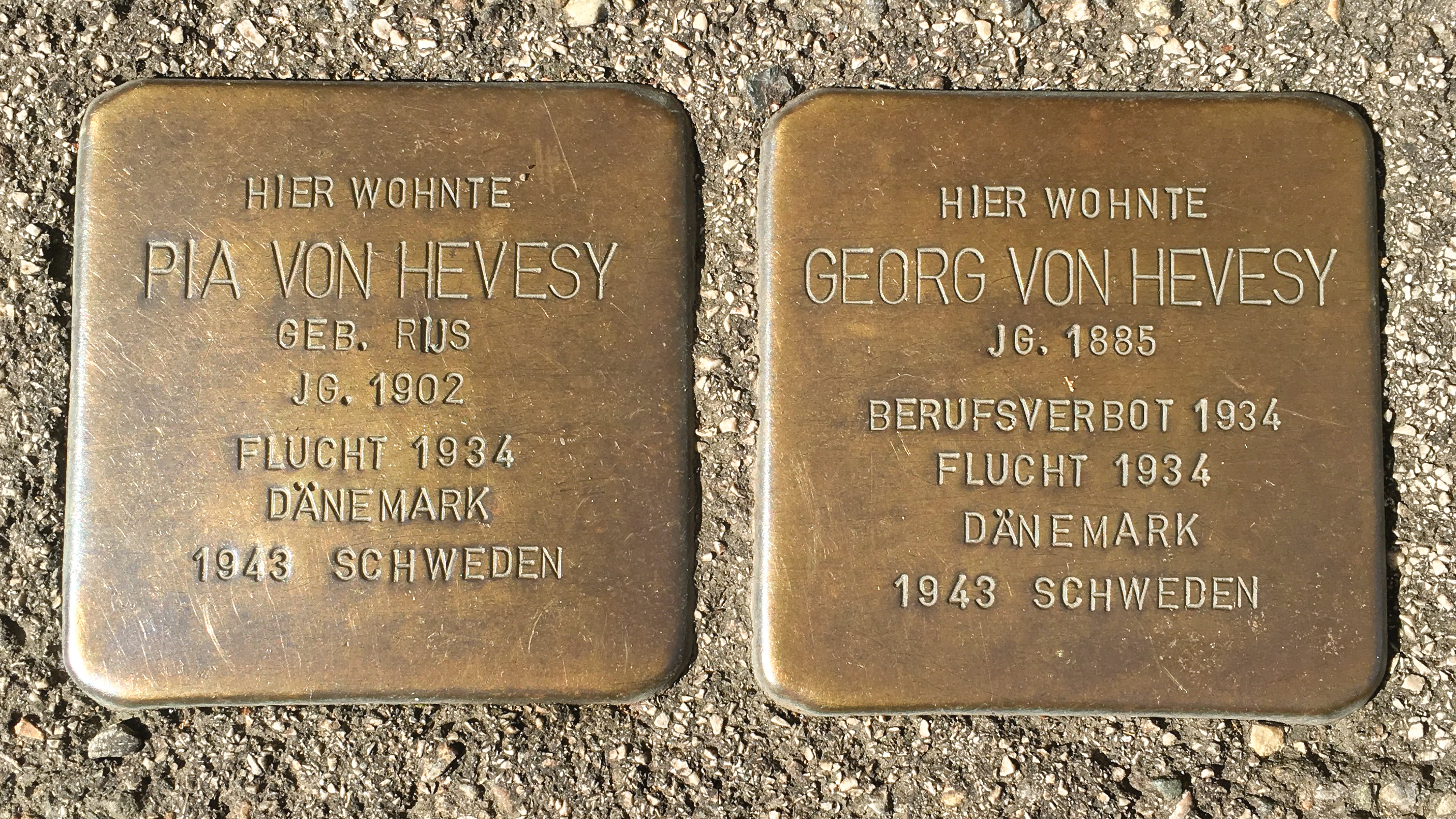
Stolpersteine memorials for Georg and his wife Pia de Hevesy in Freiburg

Prior to the onset of World War II, Max von Laue and James Franck had sent their gold Nobel Prize medals to Denmark to keep them from being confiscated by the Nazis. After the Nazi invasion of Denmark this placed them in danger; it was illegal at the time to send gold out of Germany, and were it discovered that Laue and Franck had done so, they could have faced prosecution. To prevent this, de Hevesy concealed the medals by dissolving them in aqua regia and placing the resulting solution on a shelf in his laboratory at the Niels Bohr Institute in Copenhagen. After the war, he returned to find the solution undisturbed and precipitated the gold out of the acid. The Nobel Society then recast the medals using the recovered gold and returned them to the two laureates.

By 1943, Copenhagen was no longer safe for a Jewish scientist and de Hevesy fled to Sweden, where he worked at the Stockholm University until 1961. In Stockholm, de Hevesy was received at the department of chemistry by the German-born Swedish professor and Nobel Prize winner Hans von Euler-Chelpin, who remained strongly pro-Germany throughout the war. Despite this, de Hevesy and von Euler-Chelpin collaborated on many scientific papers during and after the war.

While in Stockholm, de Hevesy received the Nobel Prize in chemistry. He was later inducted into the Royal Swedish Academy of Sciences and received the Copley Medal, of which he was particularly proud. De Hevesy stated: "The public thinks the Nobel Prize in chemistry for the highest honor that a scientist can receive, but it is not so. Forty or fifty have received Nobel chemistry prizes, but there are only ten foreign members of the Royal Swedish Academy, and only two have received a Copley." (Bohr was the other one.) He received the Atoms for Peace Award in 1958 for his peaceful use of radioactive isotopes.

== Family life and death ==
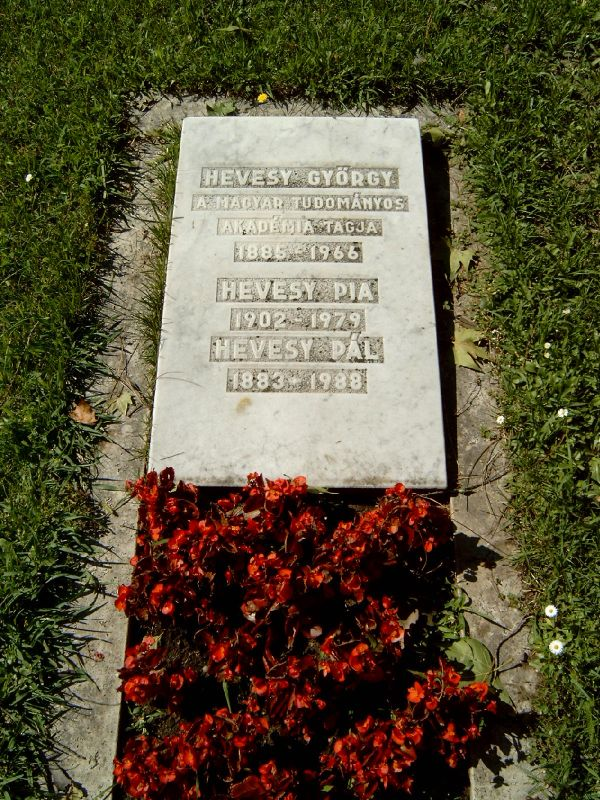
George de Hevesy's grave in Budapest. Cemetery Kerepesi: 27 Hungarian Academy of Sciences.

De Hevesy married Pia Riis in 1924. They had one son and three daughters together, one of whom (Eugenie) married a grandson of the Swedish Nobel laureate Svante Arrhenius. De Hevesy died in 1966 at the age of eighty and was buried in Freiburg. At his family's request, his remains were interred at his birthplace in Budapest at the Kerepesi Cemetery in 2001. He had published a total of 397 scientific documents, one of which was the Becquerel-Curie Memorial Lecture, in which he had reminisced about the careers of pioneers of radiochemistry.

On 10 May 2005 the Hevesy Laboratory was founded at Risø National Laboratory for Sustainable Energy, now Technical University of Denmark, DTU Nutech. It was named after George de Hevesy as the father of the isotope tracer principle under the initiative of the lab's first director, Prof. Mikael Jensen.

== See also ==
- August Krogh
- List of Jewish Nobel laureates
- Johanna Bischitz de Heves
- 10444 de Hevesy
- Hevesy (crater)
- The Martians (scientists)
