= Paul Hainzel =

German astronomer

Paul Hainzel (1527–1581) was a German astronomer and the mayor of Augsburg, Germany.

In 1569, Paul Hainzel and his brother Johannes Baptista Hainzel helped their friend Tycho Brahe design and construct a large quadrant. The quadrant, which was 19 feet in radius and built on Hainzel's estate, was used for measuring the height of stars. However, it was destroyed five years later by fire or wind, before it could make significant observations.

Around the same time that the azimuthal quadrant was designed, Tycho also gave Hainzel a portable astronomical sextant for measuring the angle between stars.

The lunar crater Hainzel is named after him.
