= Lewis (crater) =

Crater on the Moon

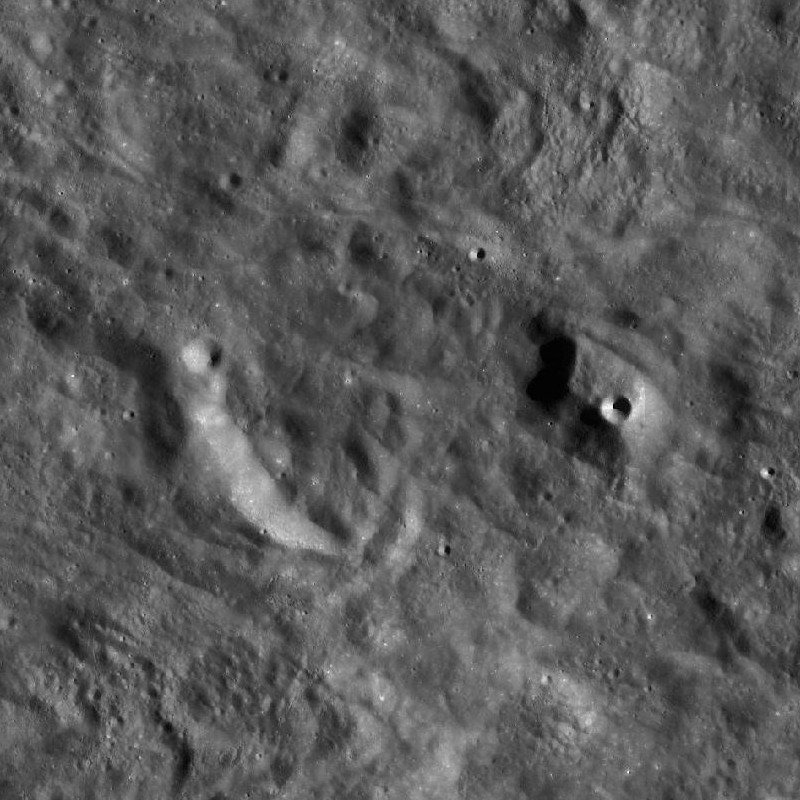
- LRO WAC image
- Coordinates: 18.5°S 113.8°W
- Diameter: 42 km
- Depth: Unknown
- Colongitude: 107° at sunrise
- Eponym: Gilbert N. Lewis

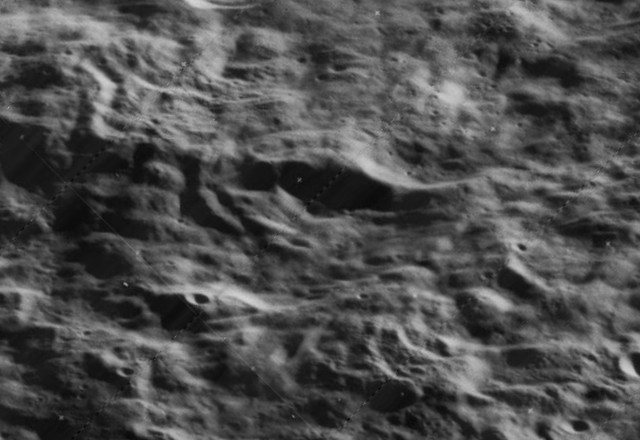
Oblique Lunar Orbiter 5 image, facing west

Lewis is a crater on the far side of the Moon. It lies along the western edge of the Montes Cordillera mountains that surround the Mare Orientale impact basin. This crater has been heavily disrupted by the formation of the basin, and it is covered by ejecta from the impact leaving only an uneven depression in the surface. The outer rim is roughly circular, and the interior is uneven.
