= Gottfried Adolf Kinau =

German Protestant minister and astronomer

Gottfried Adolf Kinau (4 January 1814 – 9 January 1888) was a German Protestant minister and astronomer.

Born in Aschersleben into a family of ministers and teachers, Kinau studied theology in Halle and Magdeburg from 1833 to 1840. Until 1851, he had several appointments as teacher. Until 1861, he was minister in Rohr in Thuringia. Until his death he was minister at the Kreuzkirche in Suhl, Thuringia. He had several offices in charity and school system.

Kinau was known as a selenographer, who had specialised in lunar rills. In 1847 he discovered six lunar rilles and continued to make lunar drawings all his life. The lunar crater Kinau is named after him.
