= Kocher (crater) =

Crater on the Moon

- Coordinates: 84.47°S 134.02°W
- Diameter: 24.03 km (14.93 mi)
- Eponym: Emil Theodor Kocher

Kocher is a lunar impact crater located on the lunar far side near the southern pole. The crater is located southeast of Ashbrook and Drygalski craters. The ejecta blanket of this crater has been suggested as a promising location for sampling South Pole-Aitken basin materials. It is named after Swiss physician Emil Kocher (1841-1917), the 1909 Nobel Prize laurette in Physiology or Medicine. The designation was formally adopted by the IAU in January 2009.

To the northwest is the plateau Mons Kocher, with a diameter of around 50 km and an altitude of 4 km above the surrounding terrain. It shows higher than normal abundances of Fe, Th, and pyroxene.
