= Kolhörster (crater) =

Lunar impact crater

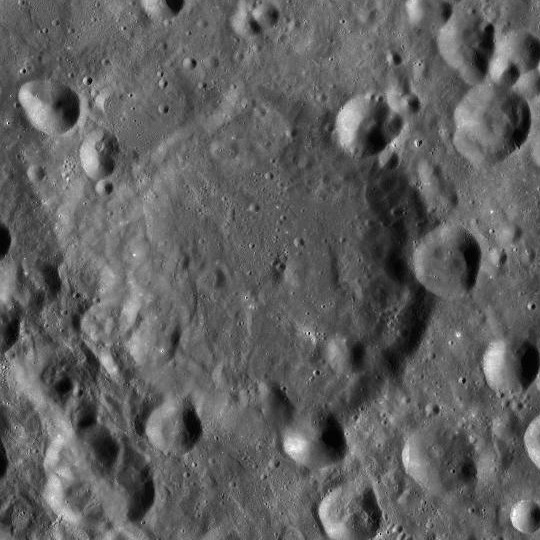
- LRO WAC image
- Coordinates: 11.2°N 114.6°W
- Diameter: 97 km
- Depth: Unknown
- Colongitude: 115° at sunrise
- Eponym: Werner Kolhörster

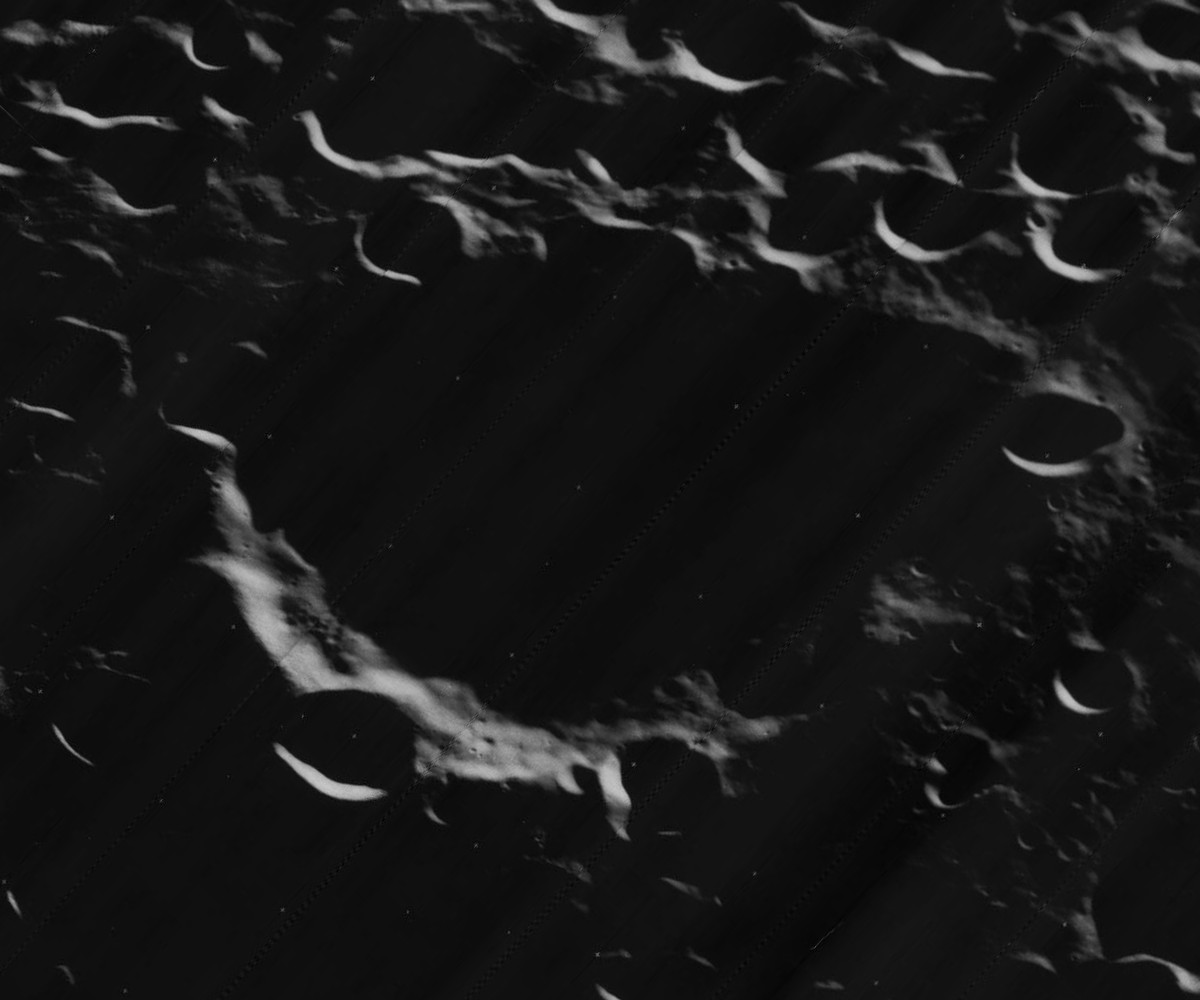
A view of Kolhörster from Lunar Orbiter 5, facing west, while the crater was at the lunar terminator

Kolhörster is a lunar impact crater that is located on the Moon's far side. It lies about a crater-diameter to the south-southeast of the crater Kamerlingh Onnes, and to the northeast of the crater Michelson. To the south of Kolhörster is an area marked with crater chains formed from secondary impacts during the creation of the Mare Imbrium impact basin. About one crater-diameter to the southeast is the Catena Leuschner crater chain, while further to the south is Catena Michelson.

The rim of this crater is marked in several locations by smaller impacts that lie along or across the side. Only the west-northwestern part is relatively free from impacts. The northeastern rim is somewhat indented into the interior of the crater. Within the interior the floor is relatively featureless and level, with only a few tiny craterlets to mark the surface.
