= Ashbrook (crater) =

Lunar surface depression

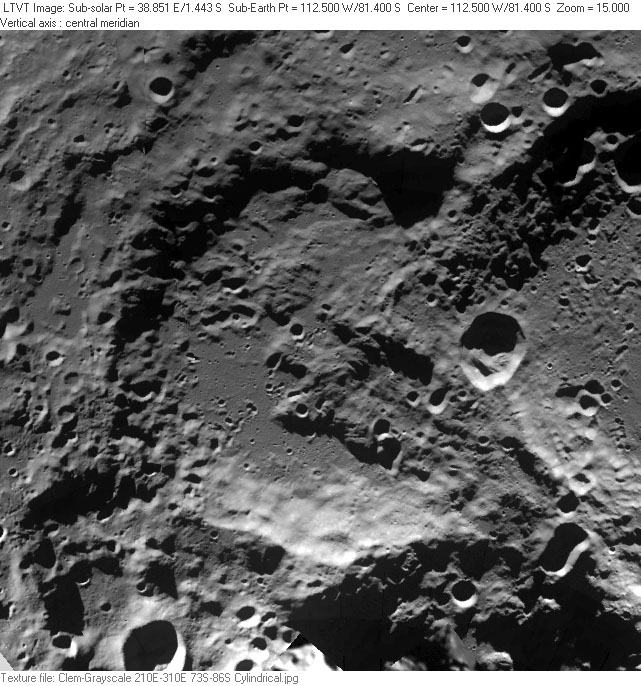
- Clementine mosaic
- Coordinates: 81.4°S 112.5°W
- Diameter: 157.68 km (97.98 mi)
- Depth: Unknown
- Colongitude: 125° at sunrise
- Formation: Pre-Nectarian
- Eponym: Joseph Ashbrook

Ashbrook is a large lunar impact crater that is located in the vicinity of the south pole on the far side of the Moon, and so cannot be viewed directly from the Earth. It is located within the South Pole-Aitken basin. The eastern face of the crater has been overlain by the similar-sized Drygalski, and more than half the interior floor of Ashbrook is covered by its outer ramparts and ejecta. To the northwest is a walled plain known as Zeeman, and the plateau Mons Kocher lies just to the north.

On the lunar geologic timescale, this formation dates to the Pre-Nectarian period. The surviving outer rim of Ashbrook is worn and eroded by subsequent impacts, although much of the original formation is still visible. If the crater once possessed a central peak, it is now buried by the ejecta from Drygalski. Only a section of the interior floor near the southwest rim is flat, being marked only by tiny craterlets.

This crater is named after American astronomer Joseph Ashbrook (1918-1980). It was previously designated Drygalski Q before this designation was adopted by the IAU in 1994. In lunar studies, J. Ashbrook is referenced for his method for estimating the height of lunar domes from their shadows.
