= Karrer (crater) =

Crater on the Moon

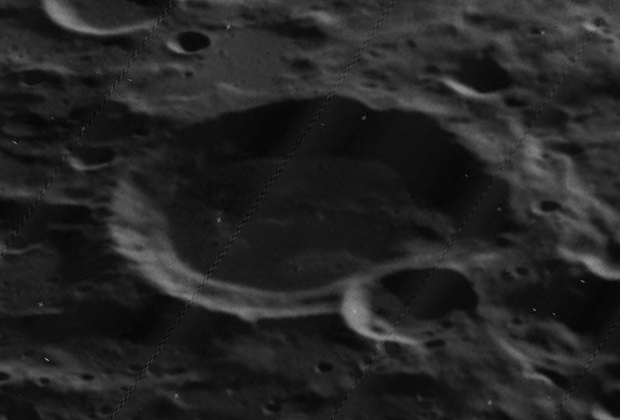
- Oblique Lunar Orbiter 5 image
- Coordinates: 52.1°S 141.8°W
- Diameter: 51 km
- Depth: Unknown
- Colongitude: 144° at sunrise
- Eponym: Paul Karrer

Karrer is a lunar impact crater that is located in the southern hemisphere on the far side of the Moon. It lies to the northeast of the crater Minkowski, and south of Leavitt.

The most notable feature of this crater is the dark-hued floor, created when the interior was resurfaced by lava flows that had a lower albedo than the surrounding terrain. The outer rim is nearly circular, but broken in the northeast by a smaller overlapping crater. The inner wall has the same albedo as the surrounding terrain, and marks the perimeter of the flooded floor. The rim is somewhat worn, particularly in the north next to the overlapping crater. On the floor is a lobate scarp that was formed as a result of contraction of the lava. The scarp extends southward across the middle of the crater, past the rim and onto the surrounding highlands.

== Sources ==
- Andersson, L. E.; Whitaker, E. A. (1982). NASA Catalogue of Lunar Nomenclature. NASA RP-1097.
- Blue, Jennifer (July 25, 2007). "Gazetteer of Planetary Nomenclature". USGS.
- Bussey, B.; Spudis, P. (2004). The Clementine Atlas of the Moon. New York: Cambridge University Press. ISBN 978-0-521-81528-4.
- Cocks, Elijah E.; Cocks, Josiah C. (1995). Who's Who on the Moon: A Biographical Dictionary of Lunar Nomenclature. Tudor Publishers. ISBN 978-0-936389-27-1.
- McDowell, Jonathan (July 15, 2007). "Lunar Nomenclature". Jonathan's Space Report. Archived from the original on 2012-02-08.
- Menzel, D. H.; Minnaert, M.; Levin, B.; Dollfus, A.; Bell, B. (1971). "Report on Lunar Nomenclature by the Working Group of Commission 17 of the IAU". Space Science Reviews. 12 (2): 136–186. Bibcode:1971SSRv...12..136M. doi:10.1007/BF00171763. S2CID 122125855.
- Moore, Patrick (2001). On the Moon. Sterling Publishing Co. ISBN 978-0-304-35469-6.
- Price, Fred W. (1988). The Moon Observer's Handbook. Cambridge University Press. ISBN 978-0-521-33500-3.
- Rükl, Antonín (1990). Atlas of the Moon. Kalmbach Books. ISBN 978-0-913135-17-4.
- Webb, Rev. T. W. (1962). Celestial Objects for Common Telescopes (6th revised ed.). Dover. ISBN 978-0-486-20917-3.
- Whitaker, Ewen A. (1999). Mapping and Naming the Moon. Cambridge University Press. ISBN 978-0-521-62248-6.
- Wlasuk, Peter T. (2000). Observing the Moon. Springer. ISBN 978-1-85233-193-1.
