= Konoplev (crater) =

Crater on the Moon

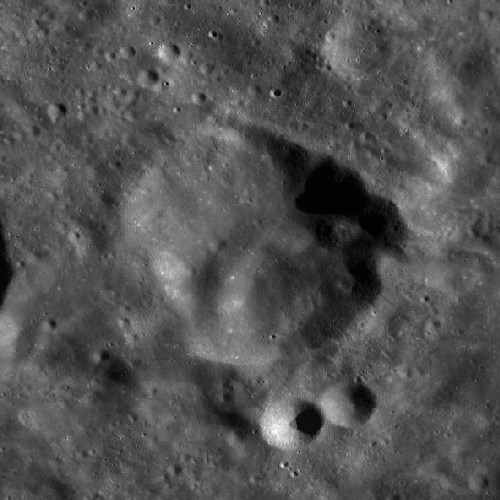
- LRO WAC image
- Coordinates: 28.5°S 125.5°W
- Diameter: 25 km
- Depth: Unknown
- Colongitude: 126° at sunrise
- Eponym: Boris Konoplev

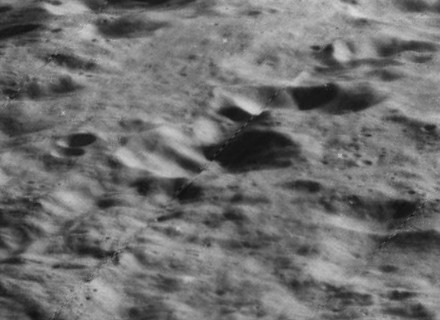
Oblique Lunar Orbiter 5 image, facing west

Konoplev is a small lunar impact crater that is located on the Moon's far side. It lies less than a crater diameter to the west of the satellite crater Ellerman Q. Ellerman itself is located farther to the northeast. To the north-northeast of Konoplev is the larger crater Gerasimovich.

This crater lies near the outer fringes of the huge skirt of ejecta that surrounds the Mare Orientale impact basin to the east. Streaks of this material lie in the surrounding terrain and across the northern half of the crater. Konoplev is a bowl-shaped structure with a circular outer rim and simple walls that slope down to the interior.
