= Haber (crater) =

Crater on the Moon

- Coordinates: 83.4°N 95.3°W
- Diameter: 55.5 km
- Eponym: Fritz Haber

Haber is a lunar impact crater on the lunar far side near the northern pole. The crater was adopted and named after German chemist Fritz Haber by the IAU in 2009.
