= Hainzel (crater) =

Crater on the Moon

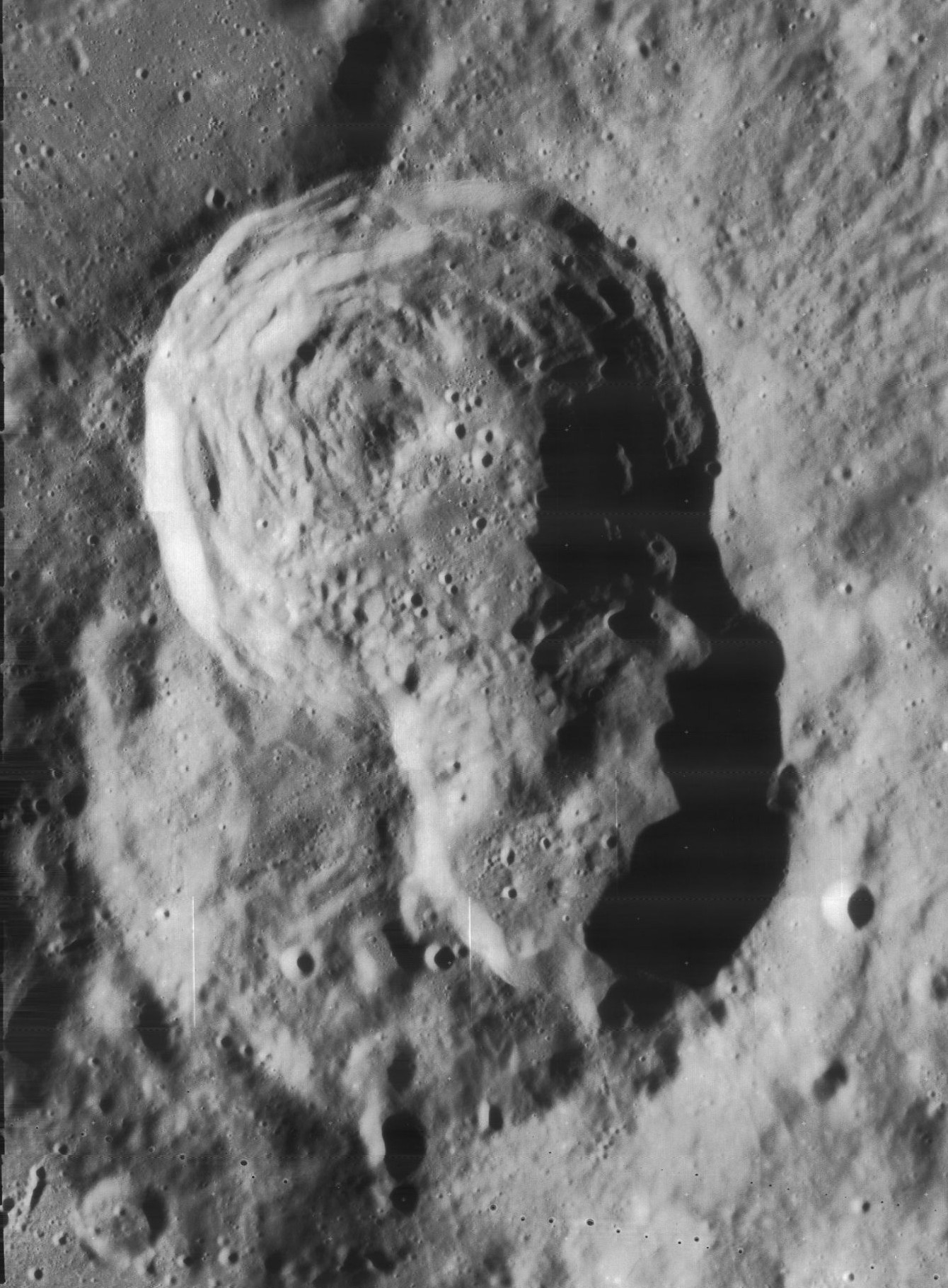
- Lunar Orbiter 4 image, with Hainzel at bottom, Hainzel C below right of center, and Hainzel A above center
- Coordinates: 41.3°S 33.5°W
- Diameter: 70 km
- Depth: 3.0 km
- Colongitude: 34° at sunrise
- Eponym: Paul Hainzel

Hainzel is the southern member of a trio of overlapping lunar impact craters. T. W. Webb said this crater "is of great depth and steepness". The composite rim is located at the west edge of Lacus Timoris in the southwest sector of the Moon. The heavily worn crater Mee is attached to the southwest wall; its rim forms a ridge running from the south of the Hainzel formation.

Hainzel forms the south portion of the grouping, and is overlain by Hainzel C to the northeast, and then by Hainzel A in the north. Hainzel A is the most intact and also the youngest of the cluster. The wall between Hainzel and Hainzel C is the most intact of the interior rims, forming a promontory from the southeast wall. Both Hainzel A and C have central peaks.

== Satellite craters ==
By convention these features are identified on lunar maps by placing the letter on the side of the crater midpoint that is closest to Hainzel.

Hainzel	Latitude	Longitude	Diameter
A	40.3° S	33.9° W	53 km
B	38.0° S	33.4° W	15 km
C	41.1° S	32.8° W	38 km
G	37.5° S	33.0° W	5 km
H	37.0° S	33.1° W	11 km
J	37.8° S	37.8° W	13 km
K	37.5° S	32.3° W	14 km
L	38.1° S	34.9° W	16 km
N	42.6° S	40.2° W	24 km
O	38.6° S	38.6° W	14 km
R	38.7° S	36.4° W	19 km
S	41.1° S	37.7° W	8 km
T	40.2° S	37.2° W	8 km
V	41.3° S	38.7° W	20 km
W	40.6° S	38.7° W	31 km
X	36.7° S	36.8° W	5 km
Y	40.8° S	39.9° W	22 km
Z	37.7° S	35.4° W	5 km

Hainzel H is a concentric (double-walled) crater.
