= Grachev (crater) =

Lunar impact crater

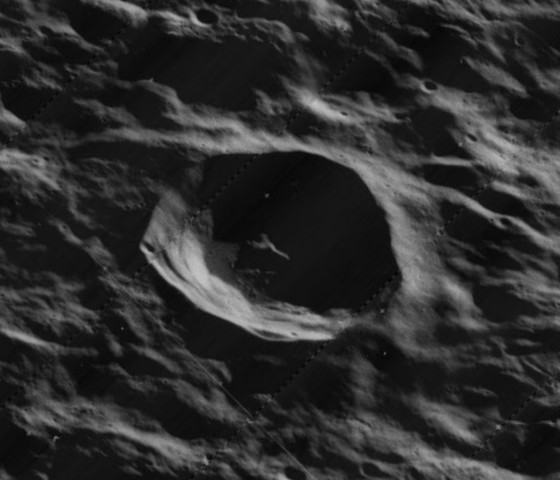
- Oblique Lunar Orbiter 5 image, facing west
- Coordinates: 3.7°S 108.2°W
- Diameter: 35 km
- Depth: Unknown
- Colongitude: 109° at sunrise
- Eponym: Andrej D. Grachev

Grachev is a lunar impact crater on the far side of the Moon. It lies to the northwest of the Mare Orientale impact basin, in the outer skirt of ejecta surrounding the Montes Cordillera mountain ring. Passing along the southwestern edge of Grachev is the Catena Michelson, a valley-like formation composed of a linear chain of small craters. This feature is radial to the Mare Orientale basin. To the north is the crater Leuschner.

This crater has only a slightly eroded outer rim, with a small outward protrusion along the northern side. The interior floor is relatively featureless, with a small rise near the midpoint.
