= Hertzsprung (crater) =

Crater on the Moon

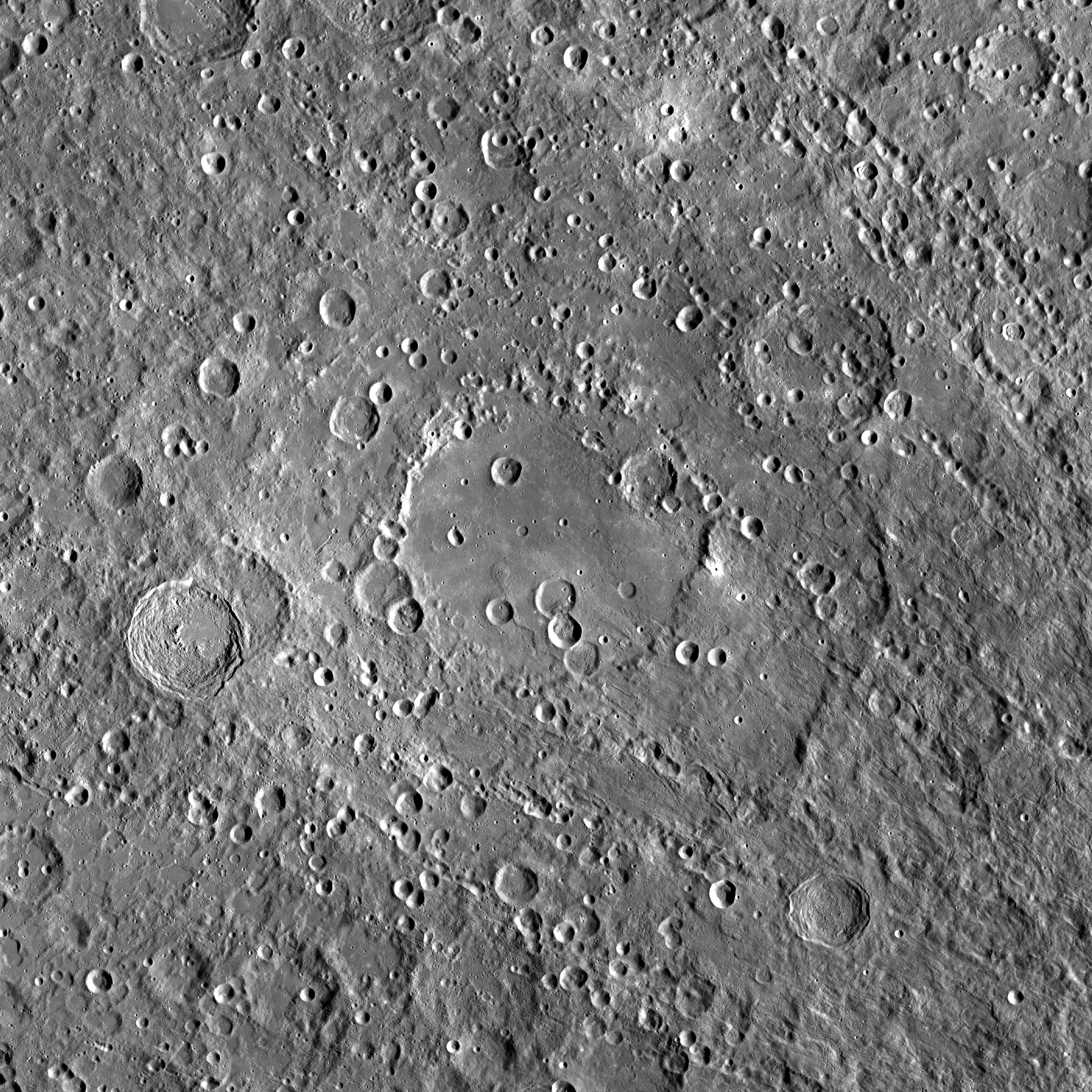
- LRO WAC mosaic
- Coordinates: 1.37°N 128.66°W
- Diameter: 570 km (350 mi)
- Depth: 5.31 km (3.30 mi)
- Colongitude: 140° at sunrise
- Formation: Nectarian
- Eponym: Ejnar Hertzsprung

Hertzsprung is an enormous lunar impact crater, or impact basin, that is located on the far side of the Moon, beyond the western limb. In dimension, this formation is larger than several of the lunar mare areas on the near side. It lies in the northwestern fringe of the blast radius of the Mare Orientale impact basin. Nearby craters of note include Michelson across the northeast rim, Vavilov across the western rim, and Lucretius to the southeast.

This crater dates to the Nectarian period of the lunar geologic timescale. The outer rim of Hertzsprung has been damaged and modified by several notable impacts (mentioned above) and a number of smaller craters. A chain of small craters, designated Catena Lucretius, begins at the southeastern outer rim and proceeds toward the west-northwest until it connects with the perimeter of the inner basin. This inner area is less rough than the outer ring of the floor, and is surrounded by a circular range of ridges. The inner perimeter is also pierced by several craters, including Hertzsprung D along the eastern portion and Hertzsprung S on the western side. Nor is the interior of the inner basin free from impacts, including K, H, X, and L, listed in the table below.

At the center of the basin is a mass concentration (mascon), or gravitational high. The mascon was first identified by Doppler tracking of the Lunar Prospector spacecraft.

The equator of the Moon passes through this formation, being located to the south of the midpoint and cutting through the central basin.

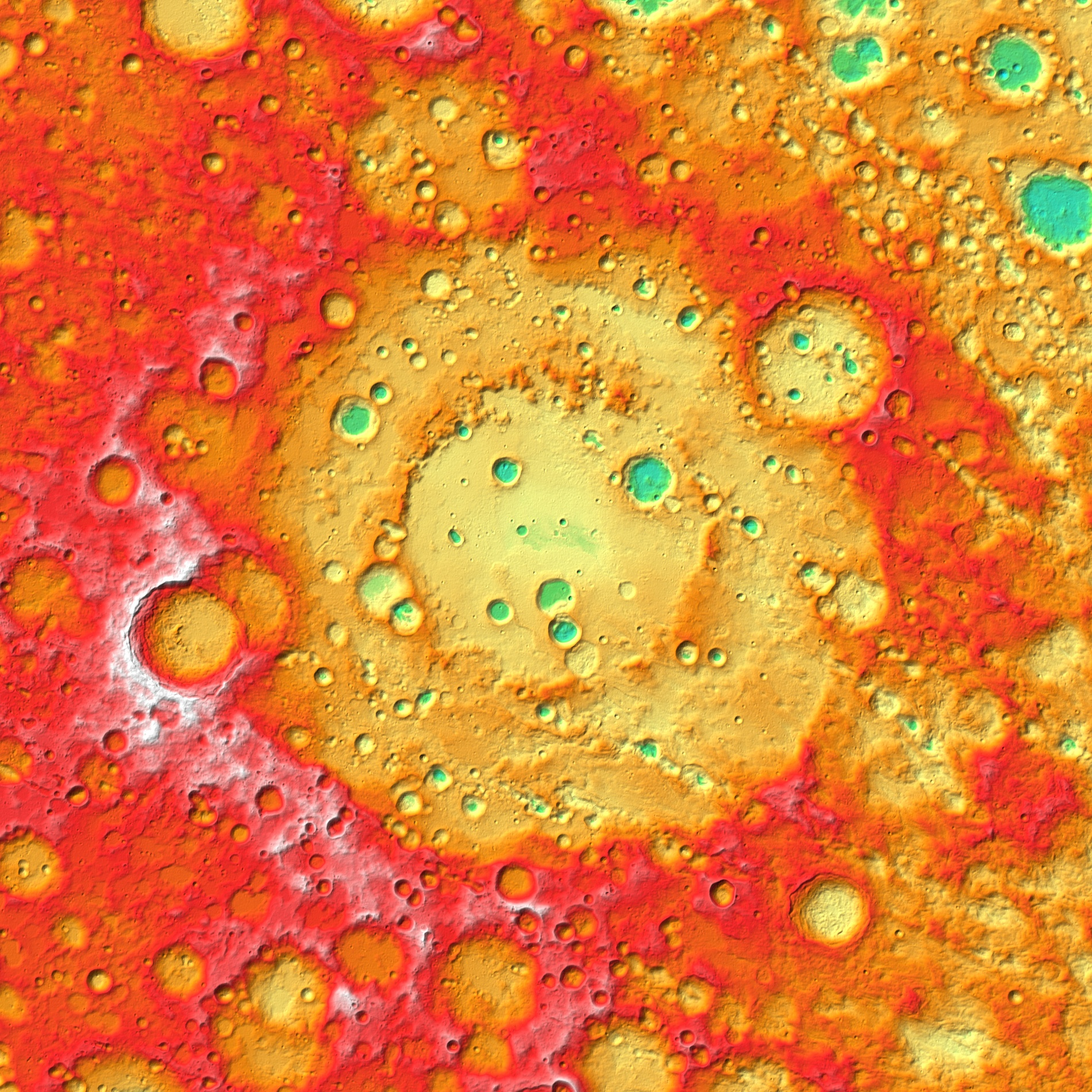
Topographic map

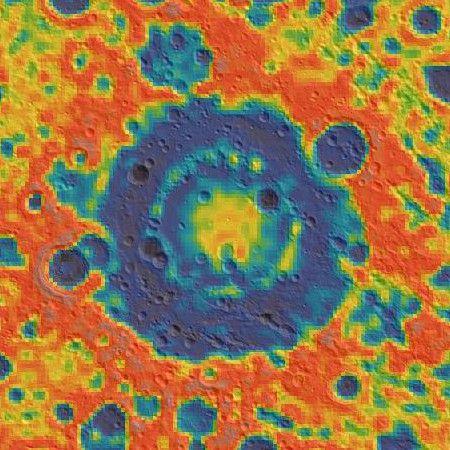
Gravity map based on GRAIL

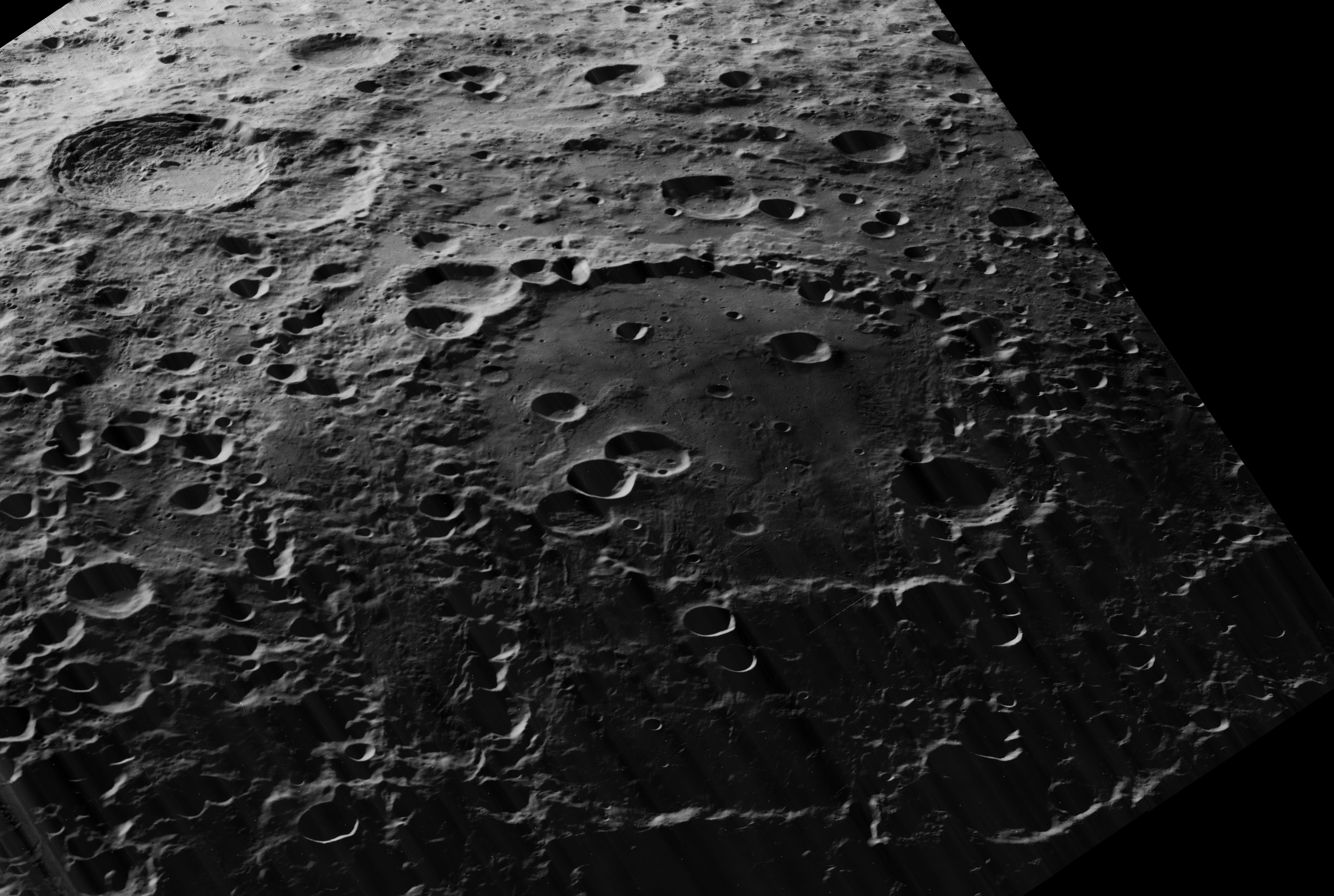
Oblique Lunar Orbiter 5 image

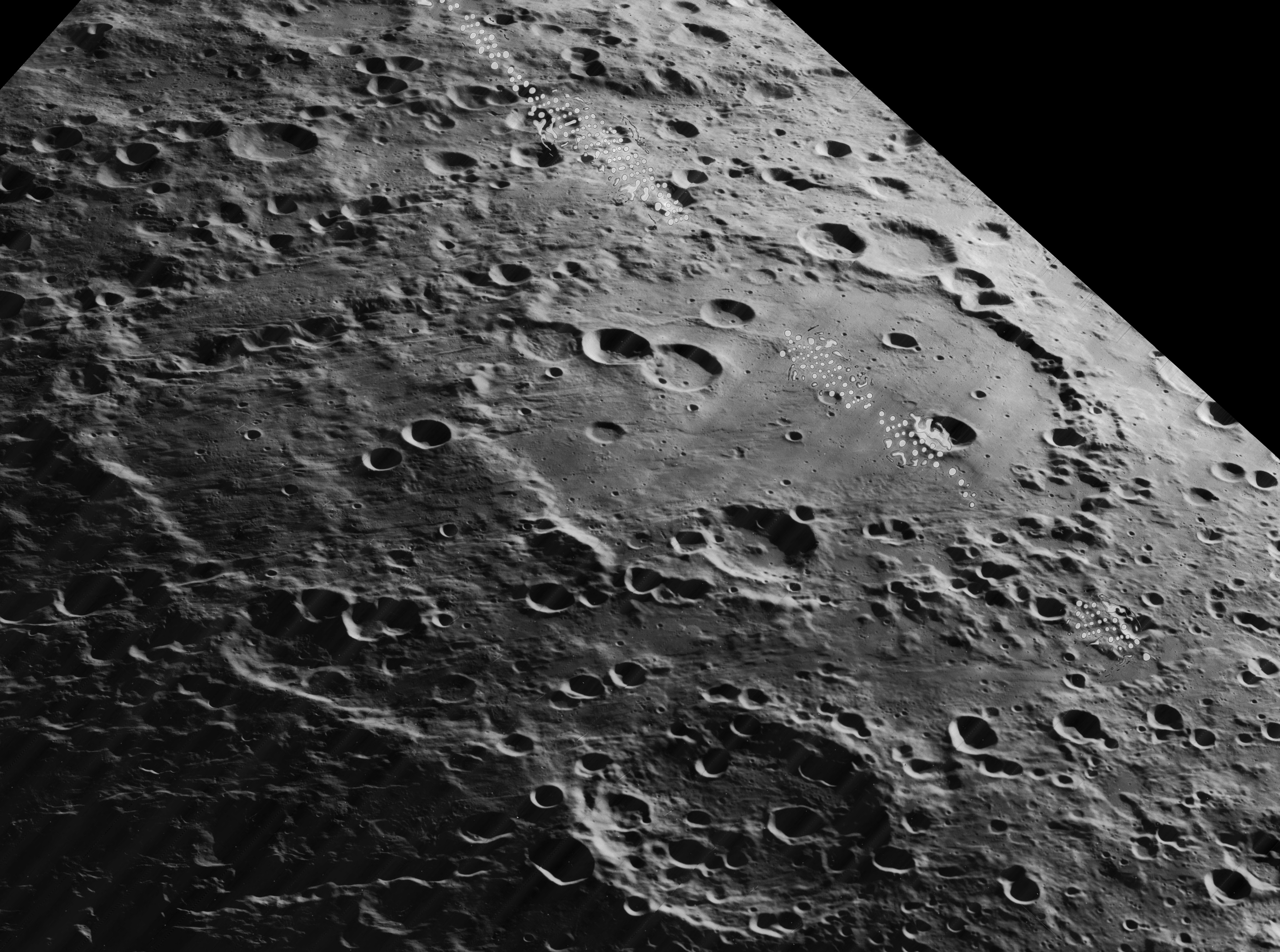
Another view from Lunar Orbiter 5

== Satellite craters ==
By convention these features are identified on lunar maps by placing the letter on the side of the crater midpoint that is closest to Hertzsprung.

| Hertzsprung | Coordinates | Diameter, km |
|---|---|---|
| D | 3.43°N 126.20°W | 48 |
| H | 1.26°S 125.15°W | 20 |
| K | 0.67°S 128.48°W | 27 |
| L | 0.22°N 128.70°W | 35 |
| M | 7.55°S 129.79°W | 36 |
| P | 0.14°S 130.24°W | 22 |
| R | 0.27°S 132.80°W | 30 |
| S | 0.45°N 133.40°W | 49 |
| V | 5.07°N 134.17°W | 40 |
| X | 3.68°N 130.08°W | 24 |
| Y | 8.77°N 131.99°W | 25 |

== 2022 Long March 3C third stage impact ==
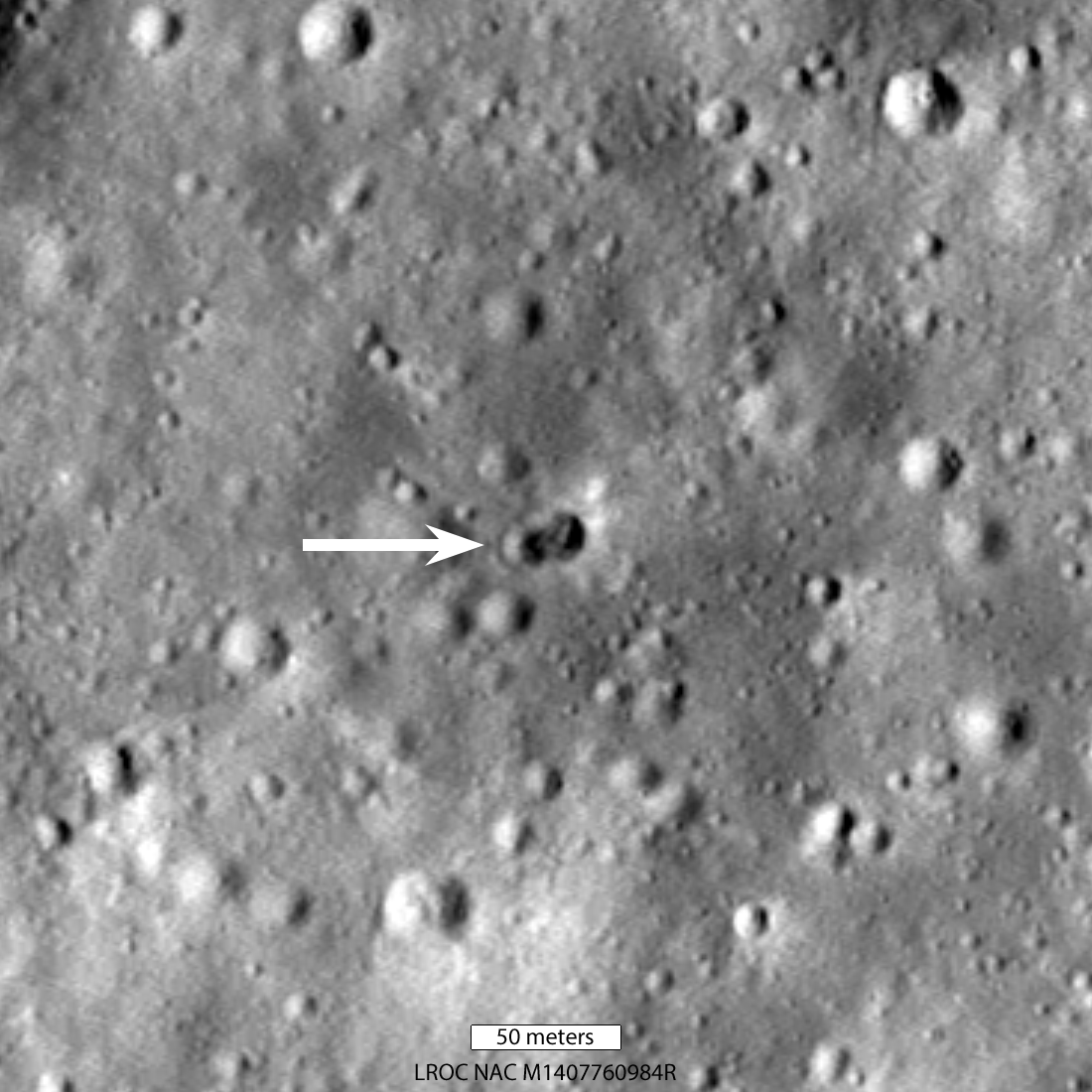
The unexpected double crater

In February 2022, after a mis-identification, it was announced that a Long March 3C third stage from the 2014 Chang'e 5 T1 mission, should have crashed in or near the crater on 4 March 2022, 12:25:58 UTC, at latitude +5.18, east longitude 233.55, plus or minus a few seconds and a few kilometers. Confirmation of the impact could be acquired through satellites like the LRO. The event showed how hard it is to track small objects in deep space. Manfred Memorial Moon Mission, a private Moon probe developed by LuxSpace was attached to the third stage and also crashed with it.

In June 2022 NASA released a picture of the crater produced by the purported rocket body. Unusually it is a double lobed crater. Previous craters created by rocket bodies on the Moon have been large single craters. It was found near the Hertzsprung D crater at coordinates (5.226 degrees north, 234.486 degrees east, 1,863 meters elevation).

The view of impact basin Hertzsprung and its surroundings was captured by human eyes during the lunar mission of Artemis II in April 2026.
