= McAuliffe (crater) =

Crater on the Moon

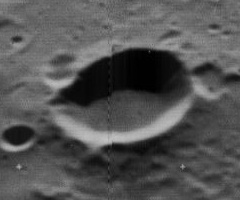
- Oblique Lunar Orbiter 5 image
- Coordinates: 33.0°S 148.9°W
- Diameter: 19 km
- Depth: Unknown
- Colongitude: 149° at sunrise
- Eponym: Christa McAuliffe

McAuliffe is a small lunar impact crater that is located on the Moon's far side. It lies within the inner ring of the double-ringed walled plain called Apollo, about one crater diameter to the northeast of the crater Resnik. To the southeast of it lies the crater pair of Jarvis and McNair.

McAuliffe is a bowl-shaped feature with a roughly circular rim. The rim edge has some wear, but is not overlain by other impacts of significance. The interior floor is roughly circular and featureless.

The name was approved by the IAU in 1988 in honor of Christa McAuliffe, who was killed in the Space Shuttle Challenger disaster on January 28, 1986. It was formerly designated Borman Y, a satellite crater of Borman.
