= Barringer (lunar crater) =

Lunar impact crater

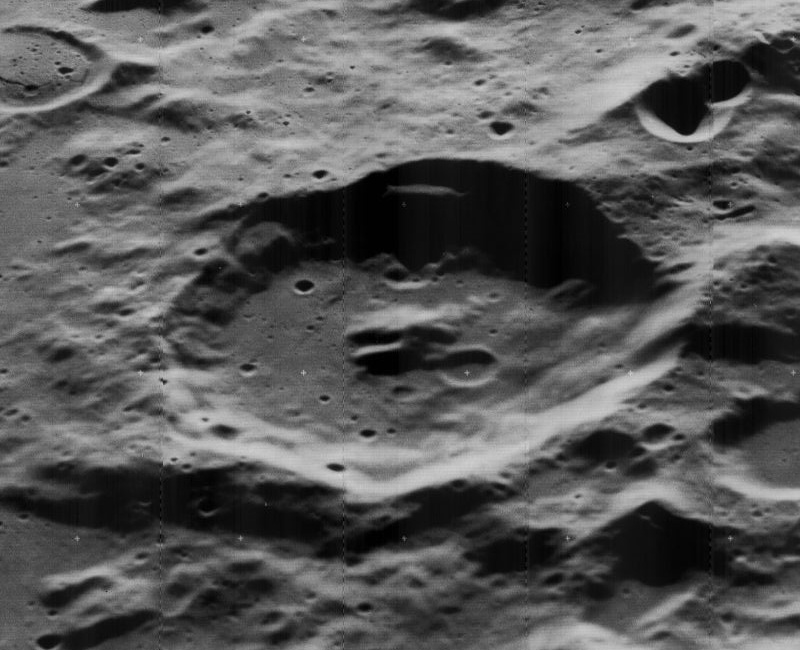
- Oblique Lunar Orbiter 5 image
- Coordinates: 28.0°S 149.7°W
- Diameter: 66.89 km (41.56 mi)
- Depth: 2.7 km
- Colongitude: 150° at sunrise
- Formation: Nectarian
- Eponym: Daniel Barringer

Barringer is a lunar impact crater that is located on the southern hemisphere on the far side of the Moon. It is attached to the north-northeastern rim of the walled basin named Apollo, and lies to the southeast of Plummer. South of Barringer, on the floor of the Apollo basin, is the crater Scobee.

This formation dates to the Nectarian epoch of the lunar geologic timescale. It is generally circular in form, with a slight outward bulge along the western rim. The outer rampart of ejecta spills over slightly into the Apollo basin floor, but the remainder of the rim lies in rugged irregular ground. At the midpoint is a central peak formation with a pair of tiny craters to either side: east and southwest. The remaining floor is relatively flat to the north and somewhat more irregular to the south.

This crater is named after American mining engineer and geologist Daniel Barringer (1860–1929). He demonstrated that the Meteor Crater in Arizona, USA is an impact crater. Its designation was officially adopted by the International Astronomical Union in 1970.

== Satellite craters ==
By convention these features are identified on lunar maps by placing the letter on the side of the crater midpoint that is closest to Barringer.

| Barringer | Latitude | Longitude | Diameter |
|---|---|---|---|
| C | 26.5° S | 148.8° W | 19 km |
| Z | 25.0° S | 150.3° W | 24 km |

The following craters have been renamed by the IAU.

- Barringer L — See Scobee (crater).
- Barringer M — See Smith (lunar crater).
