= Hendrix (crater) =

Crater on the Moon

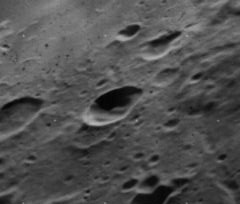
- Oblique Lunar Orbiter 5 image
- Coordinates: 46.6°S 159.2°W
- Diameter: 18 km
- Depth: Unknown
- Colongitude: 160° at sunrise
- Eponym: Don O. Hendrix

Hendrix is a small lunar impact crater that is located on the Moon's far side, deep in the southern hemisphere. Hendrix lies about a crater diameter to the south-southwest of the crater White, just beyond the outer rim of an enormous walled plain called Apollo. This is a roughly circular, bowl-shaped crater. The rim is sharp-edged and not noticeably eroded. The interior is relatively featureless.

The crater is named after Don Hendrix.

== Satellite craters ==
By convention these features are identified on lunar maps by placing the letter on the side of the crater midpoint that is closest to Hendrix.

| Hendrix | Latitude | Longitude | Diameter |
|---|---|---|---|
| M | 48.4° S | 158.9° W | 21 km |
