= Onizuka (crater) =

Crater on the Moon

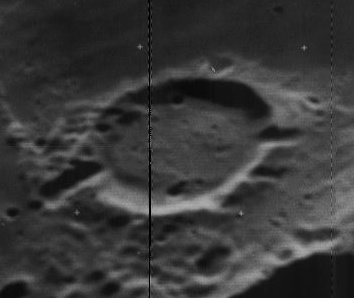
- Oblique Lunar Orbiter 5 image
- Coordinates: 36.2°S 148.9°W
- Diameter: 29 km
- Depth: Unknown
- Colongitude: 151° at sunrise
- Eponym: Ellison S. Onizuka

Onizuka is a small lunar impact crater that lies within the inner ring of the walled plain called Apollo, located on the far side of the Moon. The central portion of Apollo has been covered by dark basaltic lava, and Onizuka lies at the southern edge of this plain. To the southeast of Onizuka is the crater Borman, and to the west-southwest is Chaffee.

Onizuka is a circular, bowl-shaped crater with a sharp edge. The inner walls are simple slopes down to the interior floor, although piles of talus lie at the base of some sections of the wall. There is a small central peak at the midpoint of the interior floor. A fine groove in the surface begins at the northern rim of Onizuka and leads away across the floor of Apollo to the east.
