= Pre-Nectarian =

Geologic period, 4533 to 3920 million years ago

Chronology
Periods on the Lunar Geologic Timescale. Axis scale: Millions of years ago.

Usage information
- Celestial body: Earth's Moon
- Time scale(s) used: Lunar Geologic Timescale

Definition
- Chronological unit: Period

The pre-Nectarian period of the lunar geologic timescale runs from 4.533 billion years ago (the time of the initial formation of the Moon) to 3.920 billion years ago, when the Nectaris Basin was formed by a large impact. It is followed by the Nectarian period.

== Description ==
Pre-Nectarian rocks are rare in the lunar sample suite; they are mostly composed of lunar highlands material which have been heavily churned, brecciated, and thermally affected by subsequent impacts, particularly during the Heavy Bombardment Eon (HBE; a period of 0.6-1 Gy from the formation of the Moon until at least the formation of the Imbrium Basin ~3.9 Ga, or even later with the formation of Orientale Basin) that marks the approximate beginning of the Nectarian period. The primary pre-Nectarian lunar highland material is dominated by the rock type anorthosite, which suggests that the early stage of lunar crustal formation occurred via mineral crystallization of a global magma ocean.

This geologic period has been informally subdivided into the Cryptic Era (4.533 - 4.172 Ga ago) and Basin Groups 1-9 (4.172 - 3.92 Ga ago), but these divisions are not used on any geologic maps. Similarly the later period has also been called the Aitkenian period.

Millions of years before present

== Impact basins ==
Lunar impact basins as categorized by Wilhelms et al. (1987)

Basin name	Diameter	Age- group
Basin name	(km)	(nr.)
Procellarum	3,200	1
South Pole-Aitken	2,500	1
Tsiolkovskiy-Stark	700	2
Grissom-White	600	2
Insularum	600	2
Marginis	580	2
Flamsteed-Billy	570	2
Balmer-Kapteyn	550	2
Werner-Airy	500	2
Pingré-Hausen	300	2
Al-Khwarizmi / King	590	2
Fecunditatis	990	3
Australe	880	3
Tranquillitatis	800	3
Mutus-Vlacq	700	3
Nubium	690	3
Lomonosov-Fleming	620	3

Basin name	Diameter	Age- group
Basin name	(km)	(nr.)
Ingenii	650	4
Poincaré	340	4
Keeler-Heaviside	780	4
Coulomb-Sarton	530	5
Smythii	840	5
Lorentz	360	6
Amundsen-Ganswindt	355	7
Schiller-Zucchius	325	7
Planck	325	7
Birkhoff	330	7
Freundlich-Sharonov	600	8
Grimaldi	430	9
Apollo	505	9

For basins with no article, the two prominent
craters' names are separately linked to their
respective articles.
Names of proposed basins are italicized.
