= Dryden (crater) =

Lunar impact crater

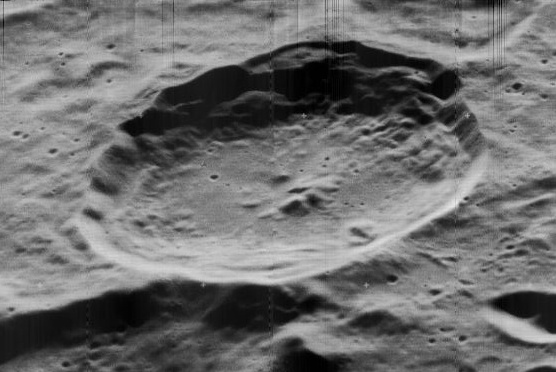
- Oblique Lunar Orbiter 5 image
- Coordinates: 33.0°S 155.2°W
- Diameter: 54.45 km (33.83 mi)
- Depth: Unknown
- Colongitude: 156° at sunrise
- Formation: Upper Imbrian
- Eponym: Hugh L. Dryden

Dryden is a lunar impact crater located in the southern hemisphere on the far side of the Moon. It lies within the huge walled plain called Apollo and is one of several features within that basin named after people associated with the Apollo program. Apollo itself has an inner ring, and Dryden is attached to the west-northwest part of that circular mountain formation. To the south of Dryden along the same range is the crater Chaffee.

On the lunar geologic timescale, this formation dates to the Upper Imbrian period. It is a well-preserved formation with a complex morphology. Most likely it formed before the mare material flooded the Apollo basin. The perimeter of Dryden forms a crude circle with an irregular shape due to several small outward bulges. The most notable of these is along the eastern side where the rim has slumped inwards. The rim is not significantly worn, and displays a sharp edge. Attached to the southeastern exterior is the ridge forming part of the inner ring of Apollo. The northeastward extension of this ring is less well defined, but appears to begin at the eastern rim.

Much of the inner wall of the crater consists of a gently sloping inner surface with a pile of debris along the bottom, forming a ring around the interior floor. Offset slightly northeast of the midpoint is a central peak formation. The spectra of this peak fits an olivine-bearing gabbroic norite mineralogy, which originated from a depth of 5.1 to 7.7 km. The remainder of the interior is marked only by a few tiny craterlets.

This formation is named after American physicist and engineer Hugh L. Dryden (1898-1965), who served as deputy administrator of NASA. Its designation was officially adopted by the International Astronomical Union in 1970.

== Satellite craters ==
By convention these features are identified on Lunar maps by placing the letter on the side of the crater midpoint that is closest to Dryden.

Dryden	Latitude	Longitude	Diameter
S	33.8° S	158.8° W	30 km
T	32.8° S	158.6° W	35 km
W	31.0° S	158.5° W	30 km
