= Resnik (crater) =

Crater on the Moon

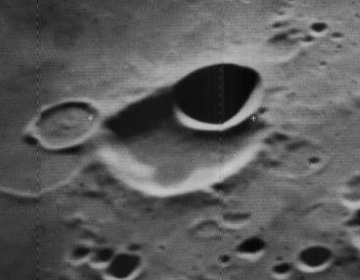
- Oblique Lunar Orbiter 5 image
- Coordinates: 33.8°S 150.1°W
- Diameter: 20 kilometres (12 mi)
- Depth: Unknown
- Colongitude: 150° at sunrise
- Eponym: Judith A. Resnik

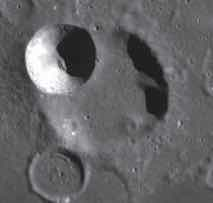
LRO image

Resnik is a small lunar impact crater that is located within the interior of a huge walled plain called Apollo, on the Moon's far side. Apollo is a double-ringed formation with a central floor that has been flooded with basaltic lava. Resnik is located at the northern edge of the dark area of the surface. It lies to the southwest of the smaller crater McAuliffe.

This is a roughly circular, bowl-shaped crater. Overlying the northwestern rim is a smaller, cup-shaped impact crater with a higher albedo than Resnik. A small, partly submerged crater is attached to the exterior along the southern rim, and a portion of a submerged crater rim lies just to the east of this feature along the same rim.

The crater name was approved by the IAU in 1988 in honor of Judith Resnik, killed in the Space Shuttle Challenger disaster on January 28, 1986. The crater was formerly designated Borman X, a satellite crater of Borman.
