= Grissom (crater) =

Crater on the Moon

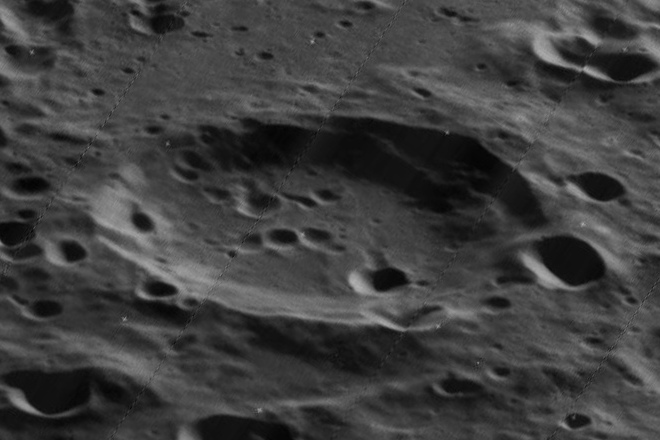
- Oblique Lunar Orbiter 5 image
- Coordinates: 46.92°S 147.98°W
- Diameter: 59.82 km (37.17 mi)
- Depth: Unknown
- Colongitude: 148° at sunrise
- Eponym: Gus Grissom

Grissom is a lunar impact crater that lies on the far side of the Moon. It is located just to the south of a huge walled plain named Apollo, and to the northeast of the crater Cori. The rim of Grissom is eroded in places, particularly along the northeast where a pair of small craters lie along the sides. There is a clustering of small craterlets located to the south of the crater midpoint. A small crater lies along the northeast edge of the floor.

The crater was named in 1970 by the IAU after astronaut Gus Grissom, killed in the Apollo 1 fire. The nearby craters White and Chaffee were named after the other two astronauts killed in the disaster, Ed White and Roger Chaffee.

== Satellite craters ==
By convention these features are identified on lunar maps by placing the letter on the side of the crater midpoint that is closest to Grissom.

Grissom	Latitude	Longitude	Diameter
K	49.5° S	145.7° W	26 km
M	49.1° S	147.7° W	38 km
