= Lovell (crater) =

Crater on the Moon

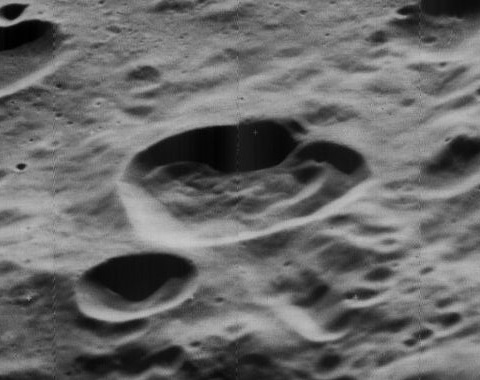
- Oblique Lunar Orbiter 5 image
- Coordinates: 36.74°S 142.47°W
- Diameter: 34 km
- Depth: Unknown
- Colongitude: 143° at sunrise
- Eponym: Jim Lovell

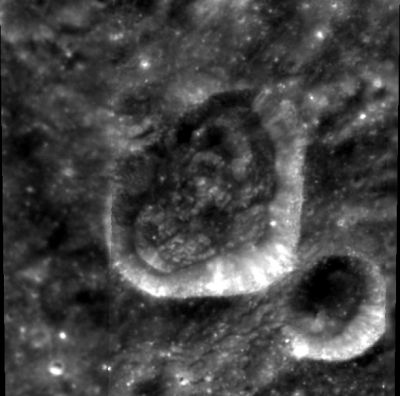
Clementine image of Lovell

Lovell is a small lunar impact crater that lies across the eastern edge of the walled plain Apollo, on the far side of the Moon. It has a somewhat irregular shape, with outward bulges to the north and west. The rim is sharp-edged, with some slight wear along the northwestern bend. The featureless inner walls slope directly down to the uneven interior floor.

Lovell crater is named after the American astronaut Jim Lovell. In 1968, Lovell and his Apollo 8 crewmates became the first humans to orbit the Moon. Two nearby craters are named after the other crew members, Frank Borman (Borman crater) and William Anders (Anders crater).

== Satellite craters ==
By convention these features are identified on lunar maps by placing the letter on the side of the crater midpoint that is closest to Lovell.

Lovell	Latitude	Longitude	Diameter	GPN ID
F	36.7° S	138.2° W	24 km	10945
R	37.7° S	144.0° W	24 km	10946
