= Scobee (crater) =

Crater on the Moon

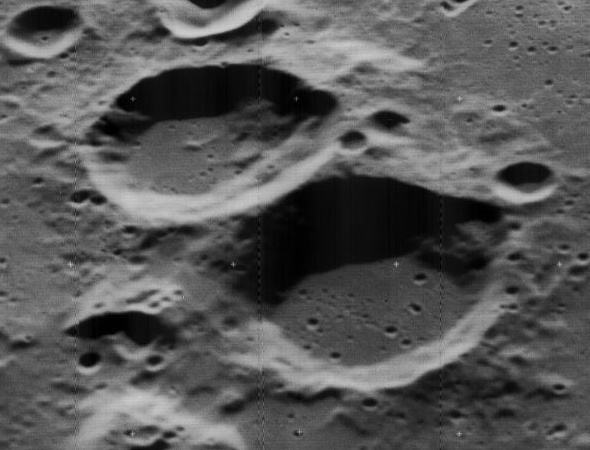
- Oblique Lunar Orbiter 5 image of Scobee (lower right) and Smith (upper left)
- Coordinates: 31.1°S 148.9°W
- Diameter: 40 km
- Depth: Unknown
- Colongitude: 150° at sunrise
- Eponym: F. R. "Dick" Scobee

Scobee is a lunar impact crater that lies within the northeastern part of the huge walled plain called Apollo, just outside the inner mountain ring of that feature. Scobee is located due south of the crater Barringer, itself along the edge of the outer rim. Attached to the southwestern outer rim of Scobee is the smaller Smith.

This is a worn and eroded crater formation. The rim has an outward bulge along the north-northwestern side. The interior floor is relatively featureless, except for some pitting from tiny craterlets.

The crater was formerly designated Barringer L, a satellite crater of Barringer.
