= Wilsing (crater) =

Crater on the Moon

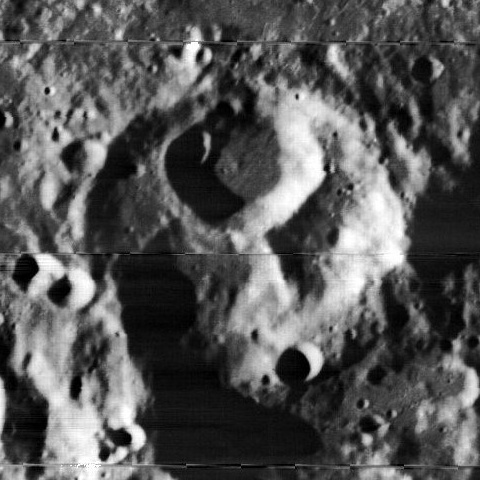
- Lunar Orbiter 1 image
- Coordinates: 21.5°S 155.2°W
- Diameter: 73 km
- Depth: Unknown
- Colongitude: 155° at sunrise
- Eponym: Johannes Wilsing

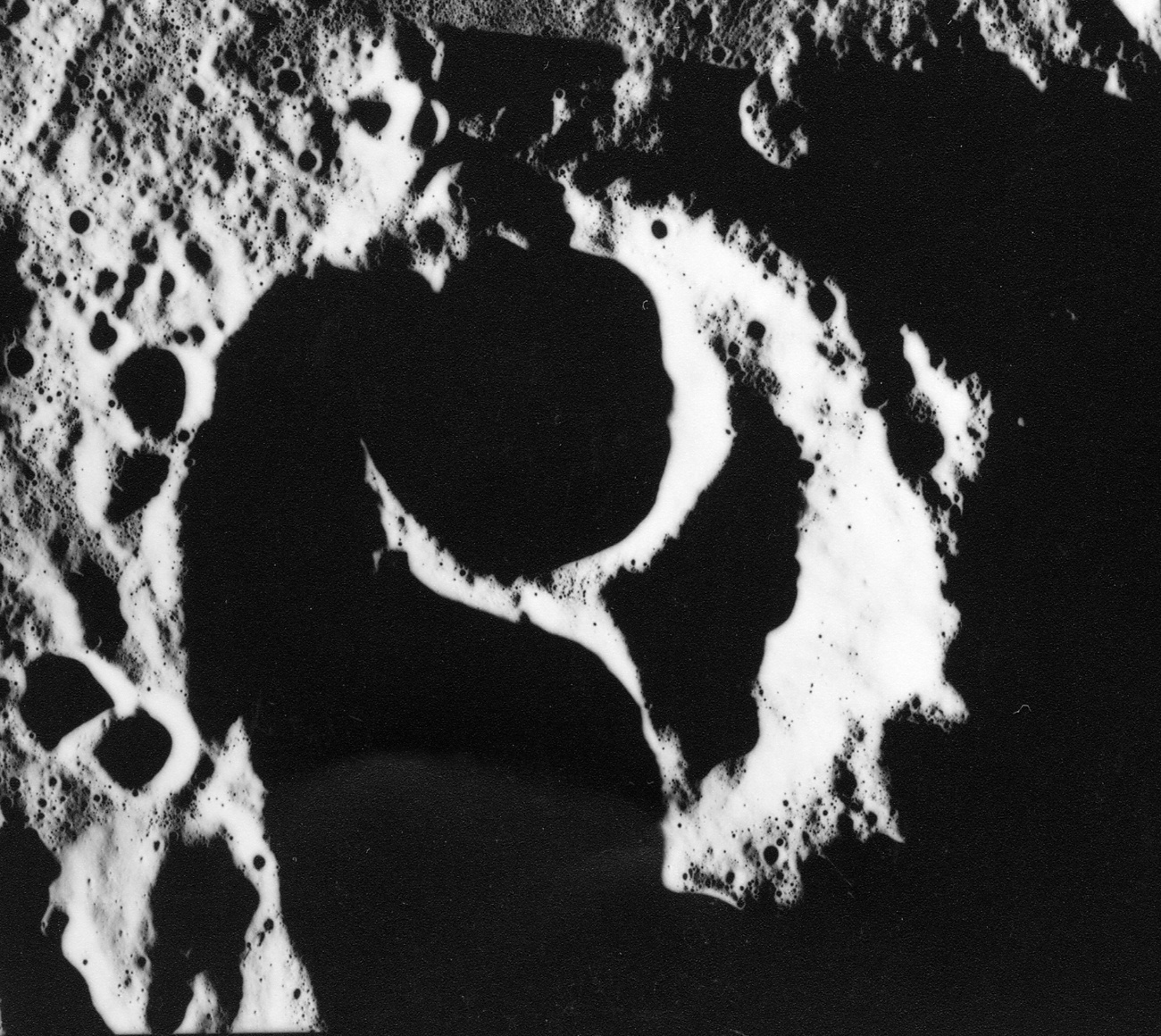
Apollo 17 image of Wilsing at the lunar terminator

Wilsing is a lunar impact crater on the far side of the Moon. It lies due north of the crater Plummer, and farther to the north of the huge walled plain called Apollo. Wilsing is located just inside the rim of the immense South Pole-Aitken basin.

This is a heavily worn formation with the smaller satellite crater Wilsing Z lying prominently across the northern half of the interior floor. The rim of Wilsing bulges outward along the northeastern face, and there are a few small craterlets along the rim to the west and south. The interior floor is somewhat uneven, with the most level portion being in the south-southwest.

== Satellite craters ==
By convention these features are identified on lunar maps by placing the letter on the side of the crater midpoint that is closest to Wilsing.

Wilsing	Latitude	Longitude	Diameter
C	19.0° S	153.0° W	33 km
D	20.0° S	152.6° W	15 km
R	22.5° S	157.5° W	24 km
T	21.3° S	159.9° W	19 km
U	20.6° S	158.9° W	26 km
V	20.5° S	158.2° W	51 km
W	18.5° S	159.8° W	36 km
X	17.4° S	157.4° W	23 km
Z	20.9° S	155.2° W	30 km
