= Scobee =

Scobee may refer to:

- Dick Scobee (1939–1986), American astronaut
- Josh Scobee (born 1982), American football kicker
- 3350 Scobee, a main-belt asteroid
- Scobee (crater), a lunar impact crater
