= Anders (crater) =

Crater on the Moon

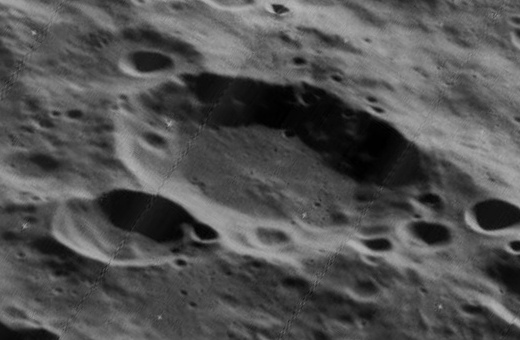
- Oblique Lunar Orbiter 5 image
- Coordinates: 41.3°S 142.9°W
- Diameter: 41.33 km (25.68 mi)
- Depth: Unknown
- Colongitude: 143° at sunrise
- Eponym: William Anders

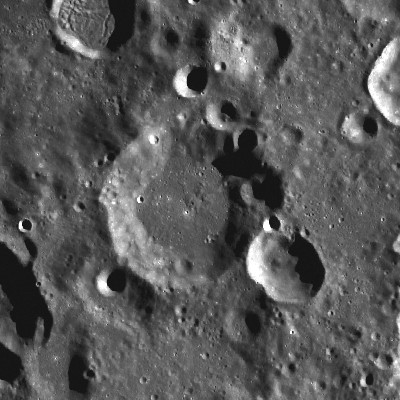
LRO image of Anders

Anders is a worn lunar impact crater that is located in the southern hemisphere on the far side of the Moon. It lies just to the southeast of the outer rim of the huge walled basin named Apollo. To the south-southeast is the crater Leavitt.

The oval-shaped Anders G intrudes slightly into the southeast rim of Anders. There is a tiny double-crater formation attached to the exterior of the northeast rim, and a short valley cuts into the northern wall. The interior floor is relatively flat, and is marked only by a tiny crater on the eastern wall.

Anders crater is named after the American astronaut William Anders (1933–2024). This designation was formally adopted by the International Astronomical Union in 1970. In 1968, Anders and his Apollo 8 crewmates became the first humans to orbit the Moon. Two nearby craters are named after the other crew members, Frank Borman (Borman crater) and Jim Lovell (Lovell crater). The crew actually chose several names for unnamed craters along their orbital track, including names of all three crew members, but these were disallowed by the IAU.

== Satellite craters ==
By convention these features are identified on lunar maps by placing the letter on the side of the crater midpoint that is closest to Anders.

Anders	Latitude	Longitude	Diameter
D	40.4° S	140.5° W	23 km
G	41.8° S	141.9° W	18 km
X	39.7° S	143.8° W	21 km
