= White (crater) =

Crater on the Moon

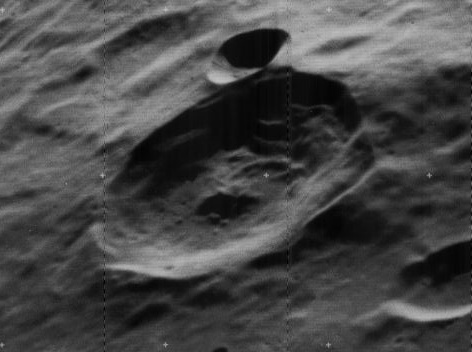
- Oblique Lunar Orbiter 5 image
- Coordinates: 44.80°S 159.04°W
- Diameter: 42.34 km (26.31 mi)
- Depth: Unknown
- Colongitude: 160° at sunrise
- Formation: Upper Imbrian
- Eponym: Ed White

White is a lunar impact crater. It lies on the far side of the Moon from the Earth, to the southwest of the huge walled plain called Apollo. About one crater diameter to the south-southwest is the small crater Hendrix. White is positioned in the central region of the South Pole-Aitken basin.

On the lunar geologic timescale, White dates to the Upper Imbrian period. This is a relatively fresh crater with a well-defined rim and interior that have not been significantly worn. There is a small, cup-shaped crater attached to the exterior along the western edge. The inner wall of White displays some slight terracing, and there is a low central ridge near the midpoint of the interior. The spectra of this orthopyroxene-rich peak fits an olivine-bearing gabbroic norite mineralogy, which originated from a depth of 3.9 to 5.8 km.

The crater was named in 1970 by the IAU after astronaut Ed White, killed in the Apollo 1 fire. The nearby craters Grissom and Chaffee were named after the other two astronauts killed in the disaster, Gus Grissom and Roger Chaffee.

== Satellite craters ==
By convention these features are identified on lunar maps by placing the letter on the side of the crater midpoint that is closest to White.

White	Latitude	Longitude	Diameter
W	42.1° S	162.7° W	24 km
