= Kleymenov (crater) =

Crater on the Moon

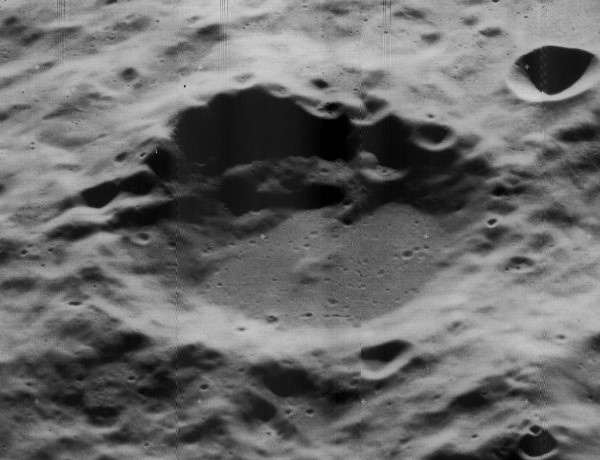
- Oblique Lunar Orbiter 5 image
- Coordinates: 32.4°S 140.2°W
- Diameter: 55 km
- Depth: Unknown
- Colongitude: 141° at sunrise
- Eponym: Ivan T. Kleymenov

Kleymenov is a crater on the far side of the Moon. It is located near the east-northeastern outer wall of a huge walled plain called Apollo, and to the west-northwest of the large crater Chebyshev. To the north is Mariotte.

This is an older, worn feature, particularly along the western edge where ejecta material covers the rim and part of the inner walls and floor. The rim has been eroded to the point where it is not sharply defined, and both the edge and inner wall are rounded and relatively featureless. There is a small crater along the eastern rim. The interior floor is relatively featureless, except for the ejecta on the western edge. The west rim of the crater rises to a peak whose summit is over 6 km above the crater floor.

The crater is named for Ivan Kleymyonov, a Soviet scientist and rocket pioneer.
