= Onizuka =

Onizuka may refer to:

== People with the surname ==
- Ellison Onizuka (1946–1986), U.S. astronaut who died in the 'Challenger' accident
- Katsuya Onizuka (born 1970), WBA Super Flyweight champion from Kitakyushu, Japan

== Places named after Ellison Onizuka ==
- Onizuka Air Force Station, a military station in Sunnyvale, California
- Onizuka Center for International Astronomy, a visitor information center at Mauna Kea, Hawaii
- Onizuka Space Center at Kona International Airport, Hawaii
- Onizuka (crater), a crater on the Moon

== Fictional ==
- Great Teacher Onizuka, a 1999 live-action, anime and manga series
  - Eikichi Onizuka, the titular character in the series

== Other uses ==
- Onizuka Station, Karatsu City, Saga Prefecture, Japan
