= Smith (lunar crater) =

Lunar crater

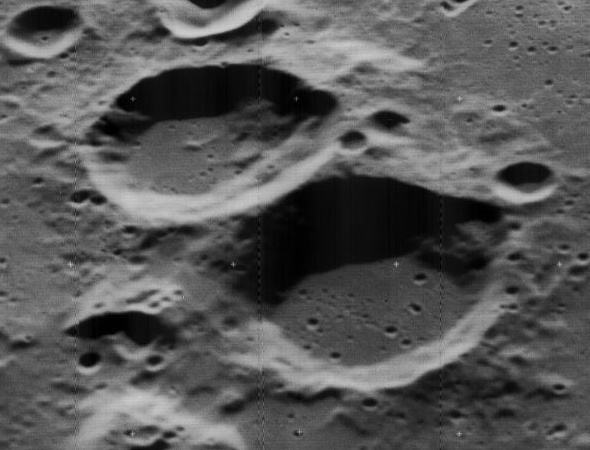
- Oblique Lunar Orbiter 5 image of Smith (upper left) and Scobee (lower right)
- Coordinates: 31.6°S 150.2°W
- Diameter: 34 km
- Depth: Unknown
- Colongitude: 150° at sunrise
- Eponym: Michael J. Smith

Smith is a lunar impact crater that is located within the huge walled plain called Apollo, on the far side of the Moon. This crater is attached to the west-southwestern outer rim of Scobee and it overlies the northern edge of the inner mountain ring within Apollo. To the north of Smith lies the crater Barringer.

This crater is roughly circular and bowl-shaped, with a mildly worn outer rim. Some piles of scree lie along the base of the inner wall in the northern part of the crater. The interior floor is relatively featureless, with a small hill at the midpoint of the crater.

The crater was formerly designated Barringer M, a satellite crater of Barringer.
