= Judith Resnik =

American engineer and astronaut (1949–1986)

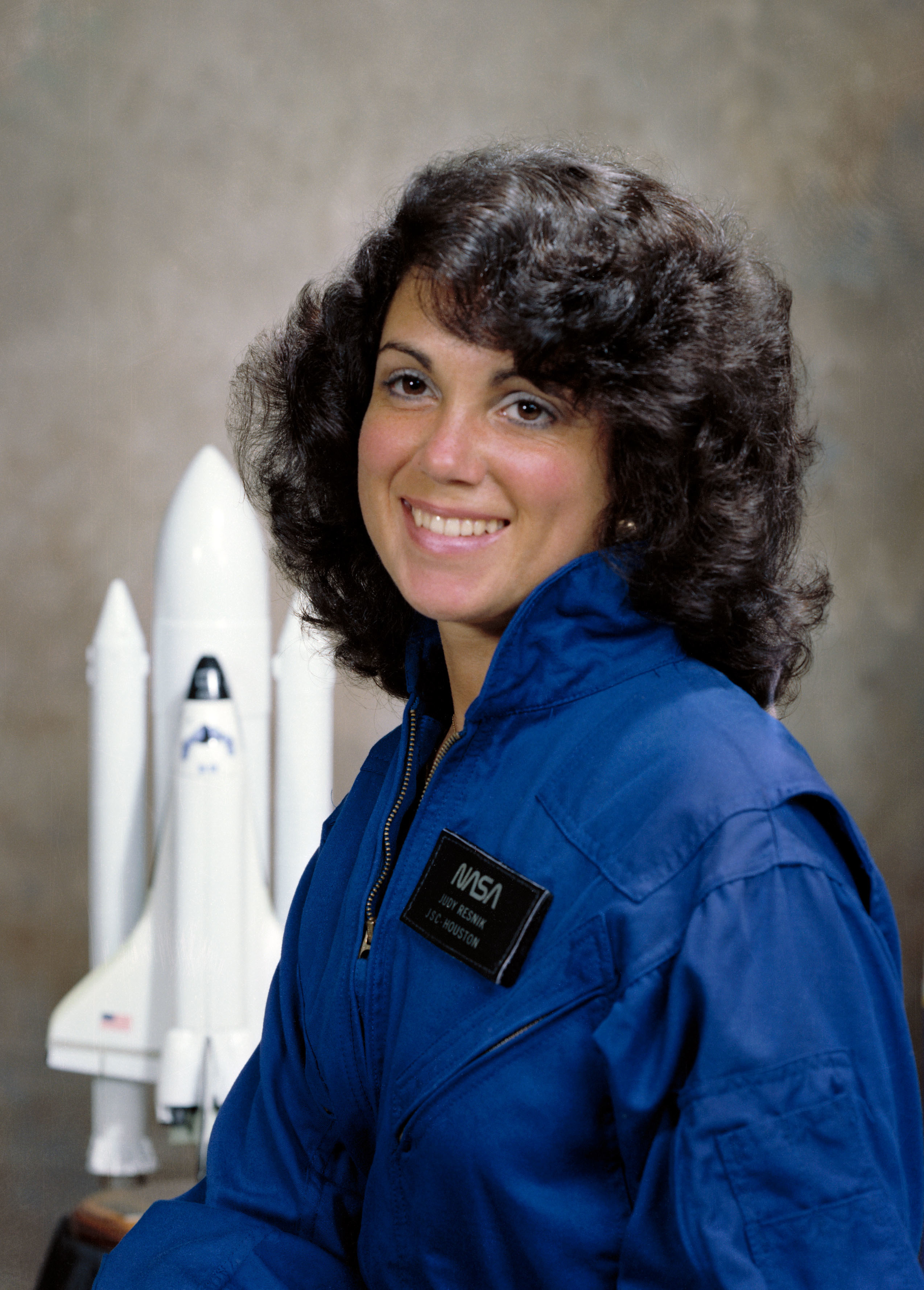
- Official portrait, 1978
- Born: Judith Arlene Resnik; April 5, 1949; Akron, Ohio, U.S.
- Died: January 28, 1986 (aged 36); North Atlantic Ocean
- Resting place: Arlington National Cemetery
- Education: Carnegie Mellon University (BS); University of Maryland, College Park (MS, PhD)
- Awards: Congressional Space Medal of Honor; NASA Space Flight Medal
- Space career

NASA astronaut
- Time in space: 6d 0h 56m
- Selection: NASA Group 8 (1978)
- Mission: STS-41-D; STS-51-L (Space Shuttle Challenger disaster)
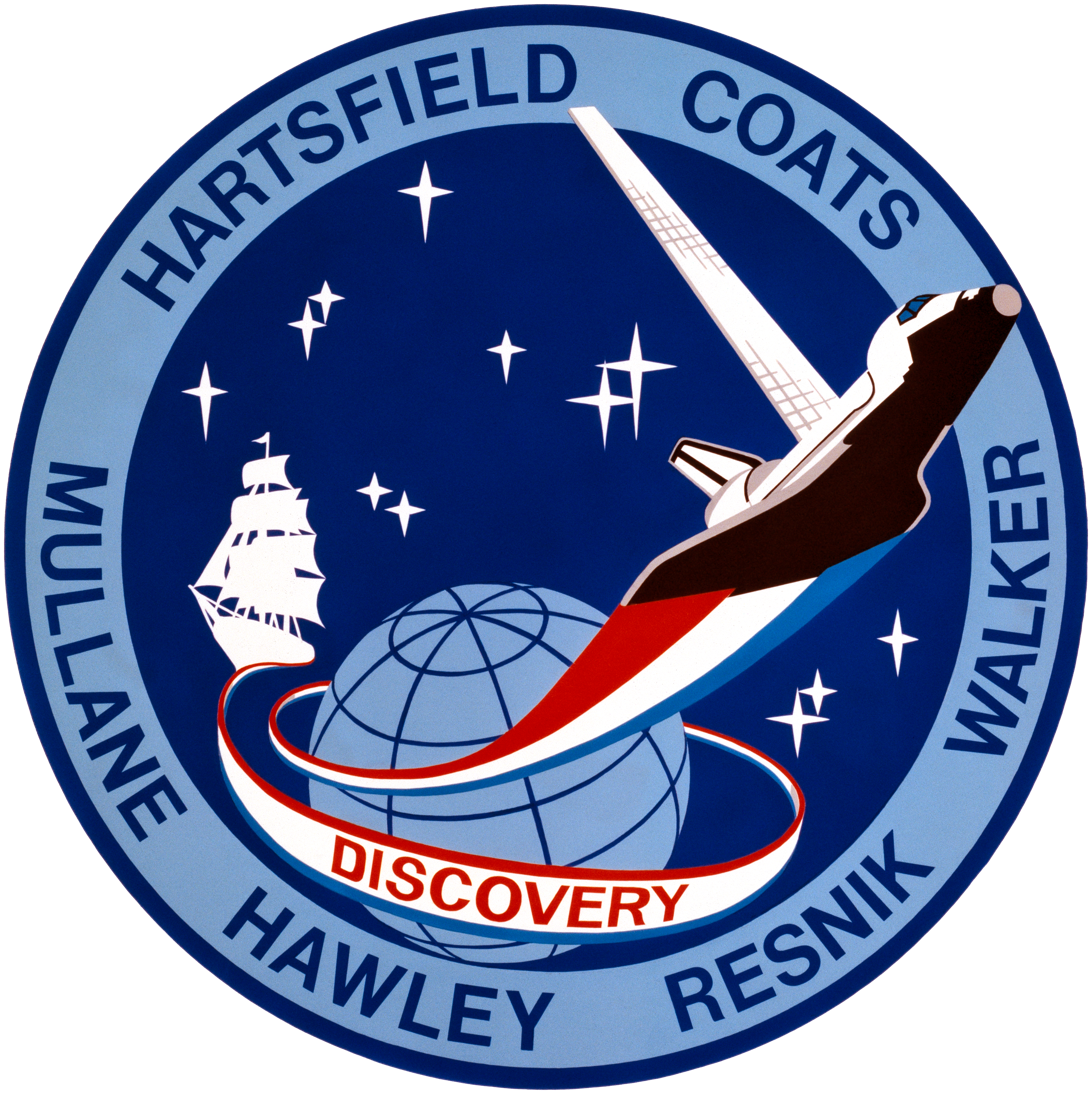
- Mission insignia
- Scientific career
- Thesis: Bleaching Kinetics of Visual Pigments (1977)
- Doctoral advisor: Felix Zajac

Judith Arlene Resnik (April 5, 1949 – January 28, 1986) was an American electrical engineer, software engineer, biomedical engineer, pilot and NASA astronaut who died in the Space Shuttle Challenger disaster. She was the fourth woman, the second American woman and the first Jewish woman of any nationality to fly in space, logging 145 hours in orbit.

Recognized while still a child for her intellectual brilliance, Resnik was accepted at Carnegie Institute of Technology after becoming only the 16th woman in the history of the United States to have attained a perfect score on the SAT exam. She graduated with a degree in electrical engineering from Carnegie Mellon before attaining a PhD in electrical engineering from the University of Maryland.

Resnik worked for RCA as an engineer on Navy missile and radar projects, as a senior systems engineer for Xerox Corporation, and published research on special-purpose integrated circuitry. She was also a pilot and made research contributions to biomedical engineering as a research fellow at the National Institutes of Health.

At age 28, Resnik was selected by NASA as a mission specialist. She was part of NASA Astronaut Group 8, the first group to include women. While training on the astronaut program, she developed software and operating procedures for NASA missions. Her first space flight was the STS-41-D mission in August and September 1984, the twelfth Space Shuttle flight, and the maiden voyage of Space Shuttle Discovery, where her duties included operating its robotic arm. Her second Shuttle mission was STS-51-L in January 1986 aboard Space Shuttle Challenger. She died when the orbiter broke up shortly after liftoff and crashed into the ocean.

== Early life ==
Judith Arlene Resnik was born in Akron, Ohio, on April 5, 1949, the daughter of Marvin Resnik, an optometrist, and his wife Sarah (née Polensky), a legal secretary. She had a brother, Charles, who was four years younger. Her father was the son of a rabbi, and he had been born in Preluke in Ukraine. His family had emigrated to Mandatory Palestine in the 1920s, and then to the United States after the 1929 Hebron massacre. He was fluent in eight languages and served in the U.S. Army during World War II in military intelligence, conducting prisoner of war interrogations and aerial reconnaissance in the Pacific Theater and the subsequent occupation of Japan. Resnik grew up in an observant Jewish home, studying at Hebrew school at Beth El Synagogue in Akron and celebrating her Bat Mitzvah in 1962, which at the time was not a common occurrence.

Resnik was noticed for her intellectual ability while still in kindergarten, and she entered elementary school a year early. She attended Fairlawn Elementary School, Simon Perkins Junior High School, and Harvey S. Firestone High School. She was an outstanding student, excelling in mathematics, languages and piano. She played classical piano, and at one point considered a career as a concert pianist. Before college, she attained a perfect score on her SAT exam, the only woman in the country to do so that year and only the 16th woman in US history. She graduated from Firestone in 1966 as valedictorian and runner-up homecoming queen.

Although her mother disapproved of her dating, Resnik had a series of boyfriends. She preferred to socialize with boys from the nearby Copley High School rather than from Firestone, where her intellectual reputation preceded her. She met Len Nahmi (himself an aspiring pilot) at a basketball game. He was half Irish and half Lebanese, and her mother disapproved of him. Nonetheless, she continued to see him secretly, and when she stayed with a cousin in Cleveland while taking a college course available to high school students, she also met with him there. Her parents acrimoniously divorced while she was a teenager, and custody was given to her mother, as was the custom in the United States. Her mother's dislike of Nahmi became more intense, and Nahmi eventually ended their relationship to spare Resnik more pain. When she was 17, she prepared and filed a successful court case so that her custody could be switched from her mother to her father, with whom she was particularly close. She tore up letters from her mother unopened. Her father remarried, and she acquired twin stepsisters, Linda and Sandy, who were nine years older than she was, and with whom she became close.

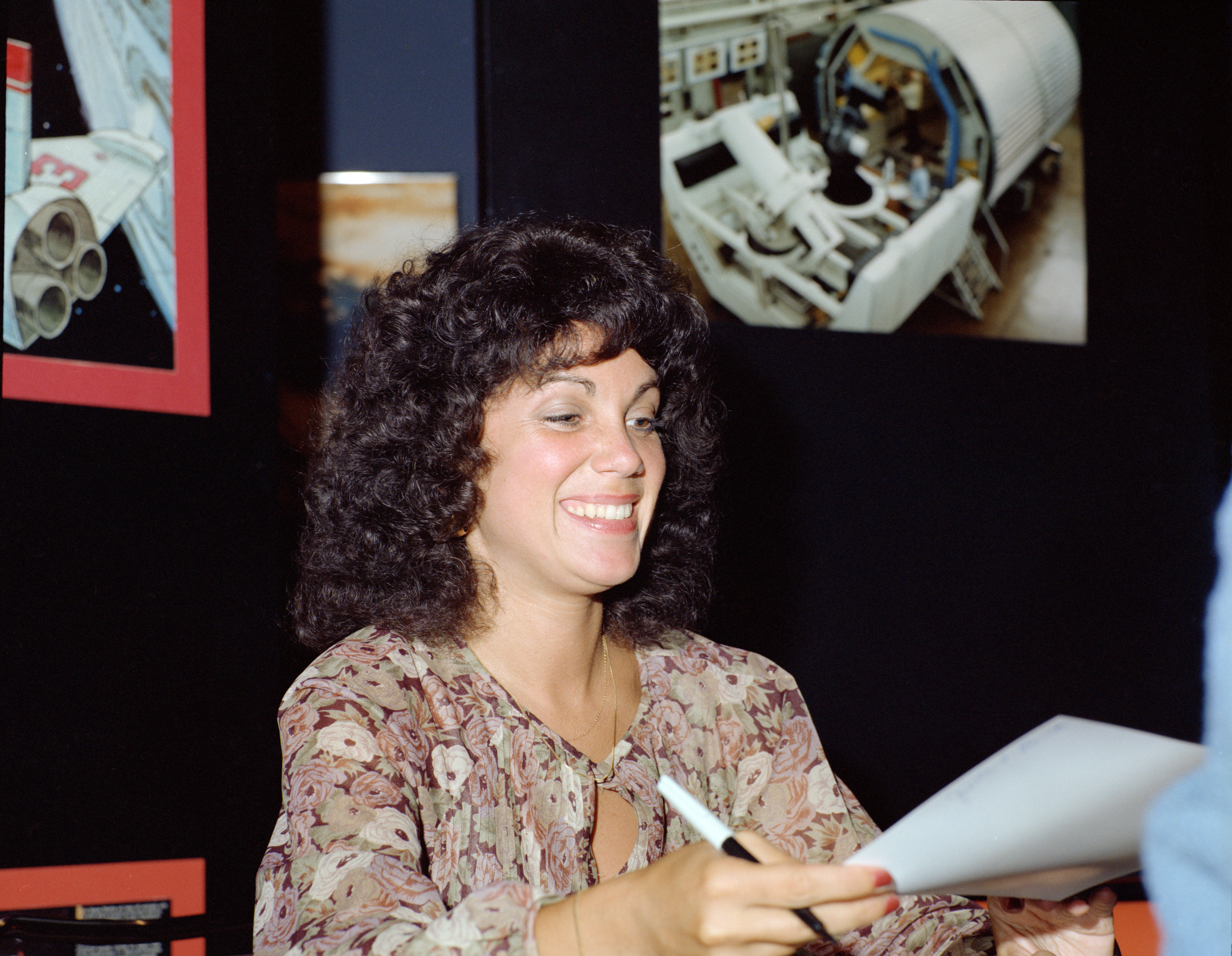
Resnik in July 1979

At age 17, Resnik entered Carnegie Institute of Technology, where she joined the Alpha Epsilon Phi sorority. She began college intending to become a math major, but in her second year, after attending electrical engineering lectures with her boyfriend Michael Oldak, she developed a passion for the subject. She was one of three female students in electrical engineering. She was a gourmet cook and a navigator in sports car rallies, in which she took part many times with Oldak in his Triumph TR6. She earned a Bachelor of Science degree in electrical engineering from Carnegie Mellon University (as it had become) in 1970. She became a member of Tau Beta Pi, Mortar Board, and Eta Kappa Nu honor societies.

Resnik married Oldak on July 14, 1970. Her mother attended the wedding; two sets of invitations were sent out, one describing her as her father's daughter, and the other as her mother's. Upon graduation from Carnegie Mellon, Resnik and Oldak moved to Moorestown, New Jersey, where they both worked for RCA. She was a design engineer on missile and radar projects and won the Graduate Study Program Award. She performed circuit design for the missile and surface radar division. While at RCA, she worked for the Navy building custom integrated circuitry for the phased-array radar control systems and developed electronics and software for NASA's sounding rocket and telemetry systems programs. An academic paper she wrote on special purpose integrated circuitry caught the attention of NASA during this time. She registered for master's degree evening courses at the University of Pennsylvania. In 1971, Oldak was accepted into Georgetown University Law Center, and they moved to Washington, D.C. Resnik continued to work for RCA, transferring to its office in Springfield, Virginia, and she continued pursuing her master's degree at the University of Maryland. She then entered a doctoral program. Resnik and Oldak divorced in 1975—he wanted children and she did not—but they remained in contact and on good terms.

While working on her doctorate, Resnik switched jobs in 1974, and went to work as a research fellow in biomedical engineering at the Laboratory of Neurophysiology at the National Institutes of Health. As a biomedical engineer, Resnik researched the physiology of visual systems. In 1977 she earned her PhD in electrical engineering with honors at the University of Maryland, writing her dissertation on "Bleaching kinetics of visual pigments". Her research involved the effects of electrical currents on the retina. An academic paper co-written by her concerning the biomedical engineering of optometry ("A novel rapid scanning microspectrophotometer and its use in measuring rhodopsin photoproduct pathways and kinetics in frog retinas") was published in the Journal of the Optical Society of America in 1978.

== NASA astronaut ==
=== Selection and training ===
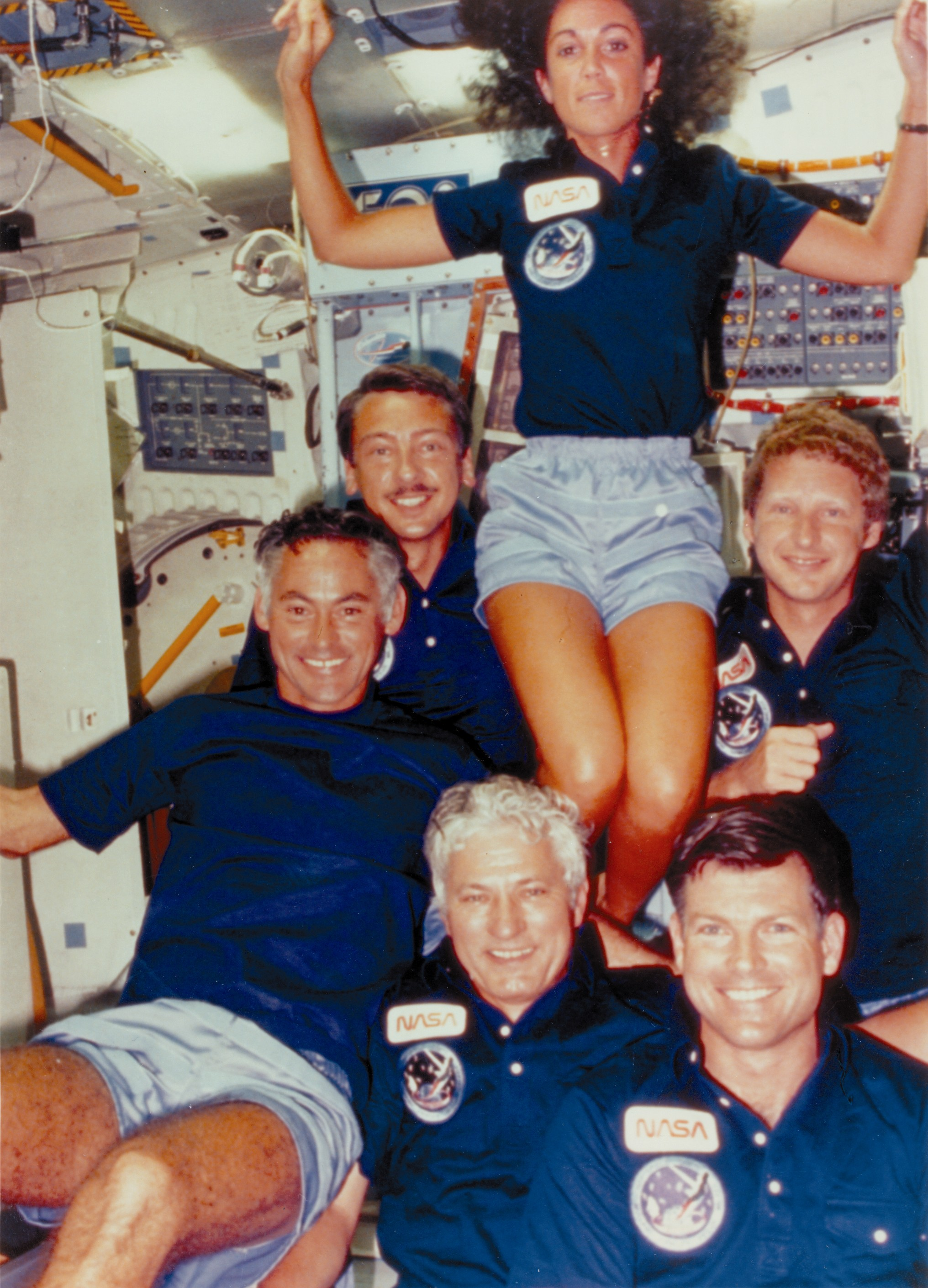
Resnik poses with the rest of the Space Shuttle Discovery crew during the STS-41-D mission.

After her divorce from Oldak, Resnik reconnected with Nahmi, who was now a commercial airline pilot. When he heard that the National Air and Space Administration (NASA) was recruiting women to become astronauts, he encouraged her to apply. They read Carrying the Fire, the 1974 book by Apollo 11 astronaut Michael Collins, and she met with him in his office at the National Air and Space Museum. She also met with another former astronaut, John Glenn, who was now a United States senator from her home state of Ohio. Nahmi convinced her to obtain a private pilot's license to bolster her credentials. Resnik qualified as a pilot in 1977, while completing her Ph.D., having achieved near-perfect scores in her flying exams (two 100s and a 98). When she received a promotion at RCA and again when she completed her doctorate, he suggested she send NASA a telegram informing them.

Resnik's mentor and advisor, Professor Angel G. Jordan, then Dean of Carnegie Mellon College of Engineering and later provost of Carnegie Mellon, also encouraged Resnik to apply for the program. After she completed her doctorate, Resnik became a senior systems engineer for Xerox Corporation in Los Angeles, working in product development. She rented an apartment in Redondo Beach, California, where she would jog along the beach to improve her stamina and reduce her weight.

In January 1978, at age 28, Resnik was selected as a mission specialist with NASA Astronaut Group 8, one of 29 men and six women selected out of 8,029 applicants in the first NASA astronaut selection that included women. This involved taking a pay cut, as her new salary was considerably less than what she was being paid at Xerox. Her fellow astronaut candidates nicknamed her "JR". She dated some of them. She trained intensely and with great determination, focusing particularly on her physical fitness. She piloted the Northrop T-38 Talon, an aircraft used by NASA astronauts for transportation and training. Astronaut Jerome Apt described her as "an excellent pilot". Asked about Resnik, fellow astronaut Rhea Seddon said: "I thought she was really really bright, obviously a very beautiful person, flirtatious, funny. She was just a live wire. We would do the happy hours, or we'd go on these NASA trips, and Judy was just a star attraction."

Resnik worked on research into the principle of orbital systems, flight software and the development of systems of manual control of spacecraft. She developed the software and operating procedures for the Space Shuttle's Remote Manipulator System (RMS). She also developed the deployment systems for the tethered satellite systems and worked on orbiter development, writing software for NASA to use on its missions. She disliked the part of her job that required making public appearances and drumming up support for the space program. She avoided television interviews when possible, and resented intrusive questions about her private life, such as questions about her divorce.

Other astronauts felt that either Resnik or Sally Ride would become the first woman in the group to fly in space, as they received the sorts of technical assignments that best prepared them for flight, such as capsule communicator (CapCom) duties. The shortlisted candidates for the mission specialist assignments for the STS-7 mission included all six women, but since the mission involved the use of the RMS, the choice of the first to fly on the Space Shuttle narrowed to Resnik, Ride and Anna Fisher, who had specialized on it. Resnik was considered best qualified, but was passed over in favor of Ride because it was felt that Resnik was less comfortable with public affairs, and the first American woman to fly in space would attract an unusual amount of public interest.

=== STS-41-D ===
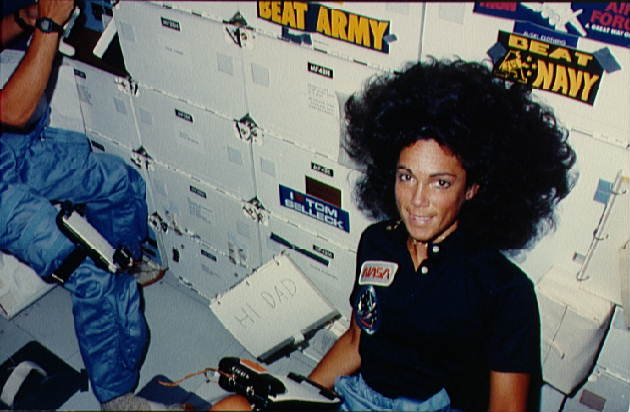
Resnik on the middeck of Space Shuttle Discovery during the STS-41-D mission, with an "I love Tom Selleck" sticker on her locker. A handwritten card reads: "Hi Dad".

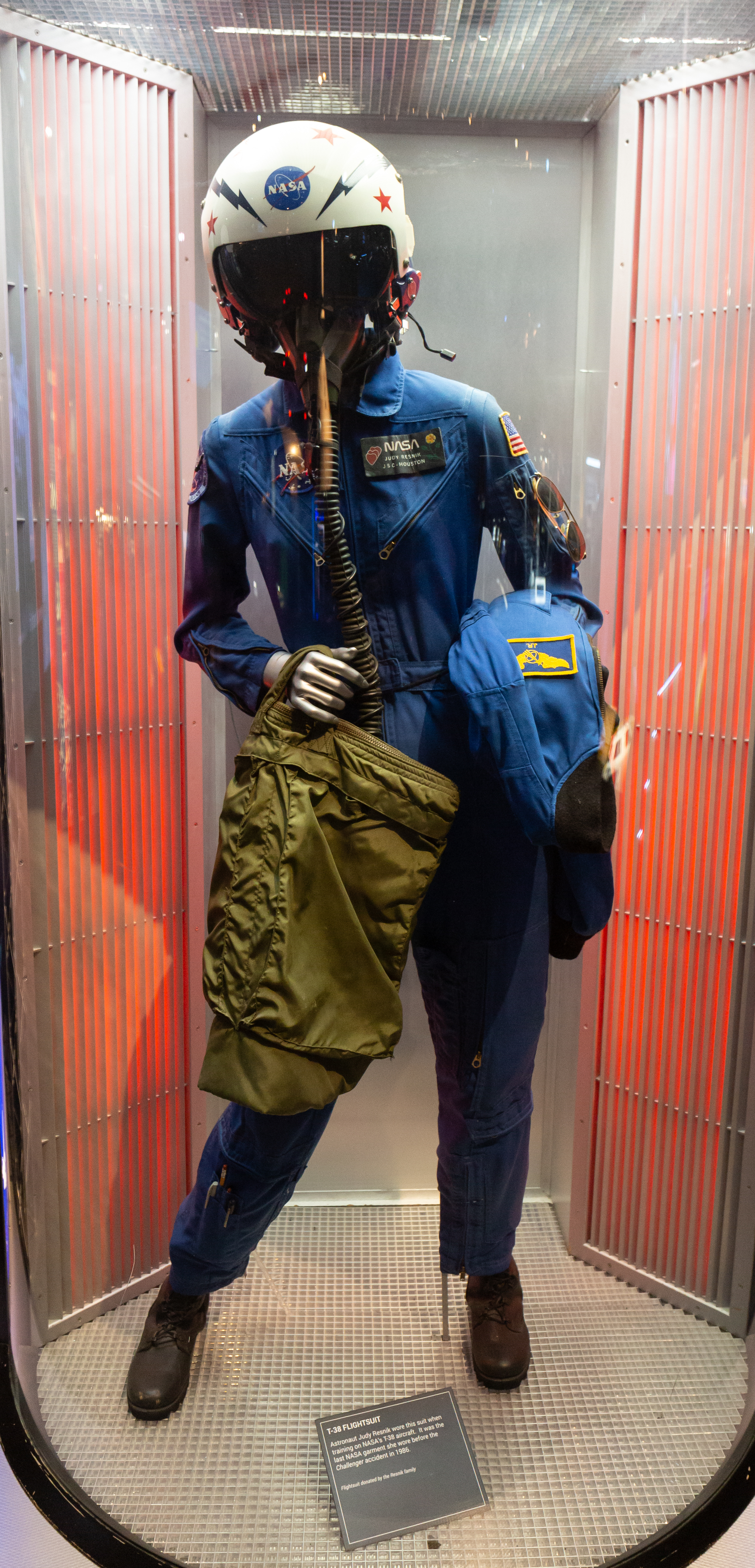
Resnik's flight suit on display at the Space Center Houston

In February 1983, Resnik was assigned to the crew of STS-41-D, the twelfth Space Shuttle flight, the maiden voyage of the Space Shuttle Discovery, along with Henry Hartsfield, Michael Coats, Steven Hawley and Mike Mullane. During a visit to a contractor's factory, Resnik whispered to Mullane: "there are no maidens on this flight". She was the center of attention on such visits, and one contractor engineer became a stalker, sending her unwelcome letters, poems and gifts. Eventually, after he appeared in the office, he had to be dealt with by NASA security. (Note: In 2003, Franz Stephan Strambach, a deranged man obsessed with Resnik, threatened to crash his aircraft into the Seat of the European Central Bank in Frankfurt, Germany. He was talked down after a telephone call to Resnik's relatives in the United States, during which he discussed a tribute page he had created for her on the World Wide Web.) After Hawley and Mullane had a fawning encounter with actor Bo Derek, who was working on the film Tarzan, the Ape Man, Resnik started calling Mullane "Tarzan" and Hawley "Cheetah"; when the office secretaries heard about this, they began referring to the STS-41-D crew as the "zoo crew". Resnik was a fan of the actor Tom Selleck, and had a coffee cup that said: "Excuse No. 1: I'm Saving Myself for Tom Selleck." Her crewmates hid a poster of Tom Selleck behind the bathroom curtain on Discovery.

The STS-41-D mission's launch was delayed three times. The first attempt, on June 25, 1984, was aborted due to a failure of the backup computer. The following day, during the second attempt, the computer detected a fault in one of the Space Shuttle main engines, and shut them down four seconds before liftoff. This was the first time a NASA space mission had been aborted after starting the engines since Gemini 6 in 1965. Discovery had to be taken back to the Vehicle Assembly Building, where the faulty engine was replaced. A further launch attempt was made on August 29, but was again delayed for a day due to a software issue. Finally, on August 30, Discovery lifted off for the first time, and was in orbit eight minutes later. Resnik invited her family to watch the launch from the VIP viewing area. This included her father, brother, Oldak and Nahmi. Her mother was also in attendance, to avoid bad publicity.

Resnik became the second American woman in space. She was also the first American Jewish astronaut to go into space, and the first Jewish woman. Her duties included operating the Space Shuttle's robotic arm, which she helped create and on which she was an expert. On the first day of the mission, Resnik and Mullane deployed the first of three commercial communications satellites, the SBS-4 satellite for Satellite Business Systems. On the second day, the crew released a second satellite, Syncom IV-2, also known as Leasat 2, for the U.S. Navy. While Hartsfield was filming its release with the IMAX camera for the documentary The Dream is Alive, Resnik's hair became caught in the camera's belt feed mechanism. The camera jammed, and she had to be cut free with scissors. Strands of loose hair floated about the cabin. Hartsfield informed the mission control center that the camera had jammed, but did not say why. Coats was able to repair the camera, and Hartsfield continued filming, while Resnik kept her distance. The crew deployed a third satellite, Telstar 302 for Telesat of Canada, without mishap the following day.

That day Resnik also deployed the OAST-1 solar array wing, considered a potential future way of generating more electrical power during space missions. After performing several dynamic tests that day and the next, she reported that the experiment was well-behaved and matched ground simulations of the array. During the mission, she held up a hand-written sign saying "Hi Dad" to the cameras, and in a live televised broadcast told President Ronald Reagan "the Earth looks great". When Reagan asked her if the flight was all she hoped it would be, she replied, "It certainly is and I couldn't have picked a better crew to fly with." After the mission, Hartsfield described Resnik as the "astronaut's astronaut", and Mullane wrote: "I was also happy to be crewed with Judy ... She was smart, hardworking, and dependable, all the things you would want in a fellow crewmember."

Discovery landed at Edwards Air Force Base on September 5, after a flight lasting 6 days and 56 minutes.

=== Space Shuttle Challenger disaster ===
On January 29, 1985, NASA announced that Resnik had been assigned to the crew of STS-51-L. The main objective of this mission was to launch TDRS-B, the second in a series of NASA Tracking and Data Relay Satellites. It would also carry the Spartan (Shuttle Pointed Autonomous Research Tool for Astronomy), which would use two ultraviolet spectrometers to study the tail of Comet Halley. Resnik was primarily responsible for the operation of the RMS and, with fellow astronaut Ronald McNair, would deploy and later retrieve the Spartan. The flight would also carry Christa McAuliffe, a teacher-observer selected as part of NASA's Teacher in Space Project. Resnik was part of the team of astronauts who flew to Washington, D.C., to speak to the 113 finalists, and provide them an insider's view of a Space Shuttle mission. They were taken to the National Air and Space Museum, where they viewed The Dream is Alive with its scenes of Resnik deploying a satellite and eating and sleeping in space. She told them that it was a shame that they could not all fly in space, but privately she disagreed with NASA's decision to send non-astronauts on the Space Shuttle. Resnik's assignment was tied to McAuliffe's; NASA wanted McAuliffe to fly with a veteran female astronaut.

Initially scheduled for January 24, 1986, the launch was delayed until January 28 by rain, high winds, a troublesome bolt on the Space Shuttle Challenger's hatch and freezing temperatures. Resnik's father and stepmother, and her brother and his family watched the launch from the VIP area, as did her Firestone High math teacher. Selleck declined her invitation to attend. Resnik carried a locket for her niece, a signet ring for her nephew and a cigarette lighter for Nahmi.

Challenger lifted off from Kennedy Space Center Launch Complex 39B at 11:38 on January 28. A minute later it broke up, torn apart by aerodynamic forces after a catastrophic failure of an O-ring seal on the starboard solid rocket booster. The cabin remained intact until it hit the water at 207 mph, killing all on board. Resnik's last recorded words aboard Challenger regarded scanning for "LVLH" (local vertical/local horizontal), reminding the cockpit crew of a switch configuration change to the attitude direction indicator. (Note: Resnik was reading from the launch checklist in her role as flight engineer. The switch change was necessary to alter the attitude direction indicator from low-vertical to low-horizontal flight mode in case they had to make an emergency abort.)

Following the disaster, examination of the recovered vehicle cockpit revealed that the Personal Egress Air Packs were activated for pilot Mike Smith and two other crew members. The location of Smith's activation switch on the back of his seat means either Resnik or Ellison Onizuka likely activated it for him. Mike Mullane wrote:

Mike Smith's PEAP had been turned on by Judy or El, I wondered if I would have had the presence of mind to do the same thing had I been in Challenger's cockpit. Or would I have been locked in a catatonic paralysis of fear? There had been nothing in our training concerning the activation of a PEAP in the event of an in-flight emergency. The fact that Judy or El had done so for Mike Smith made them heroic in my mind. They had been able to block out the terrifying sights and sounds and motions of Challenger's destruction and had reached for that switch. It was the type of thing a true astronaut would do—maintain their cool in the direst of circumstances.

This is the only evidence that shows Onizuka and Resnik were alive after the cockpit separated from the vehicle. If the cabin had lost pressure, the air packs alone would not have sustained the crew during the two-minute descent. Resnik's remains were recovered from the crashed vehicle cockpit by Navy divers from the USS Preserver. The remains of the seven crew members were cremated, comingled and buried at the Space Shuttle Challenger Memorial in Arlington National Cemetery on May 20, 1986.

== Legacy ==
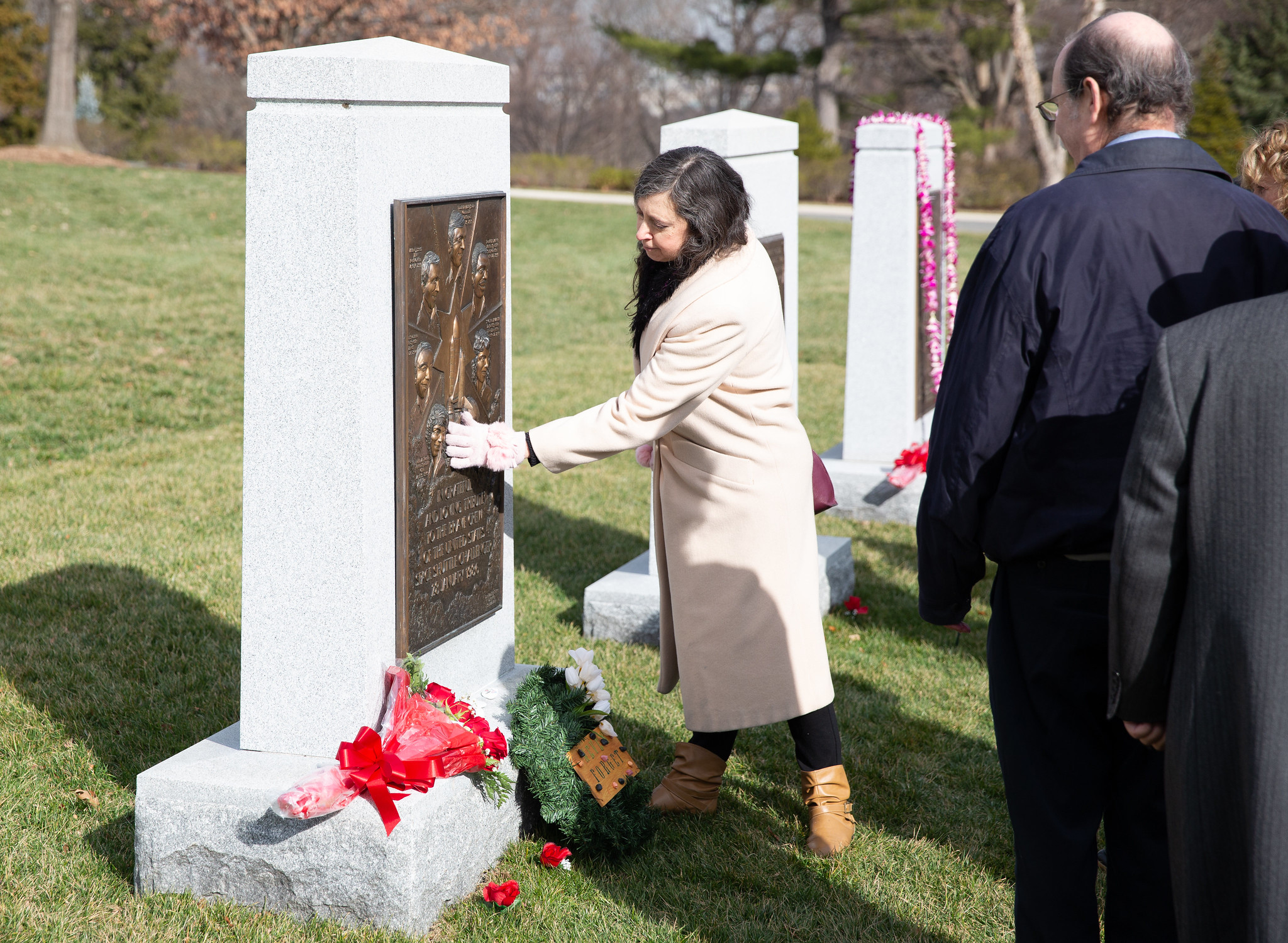
Amy Resnik, wife of Charles Resnik, touches the Space Shuttle Challenger Memorial after a wreath-laying ceremony at Arlington National Cemetery as part of NASA's Day of Remembrance.

Resnik was posthumously awarded the Congressional Space Medal of Honor. She was also awarded the NASA Space Flight Medal for her first flight. Landmarks and buildings named for her include a dormitory at her alma mater, Carnegie Mellon University; Judith A. Resnik Elementary School in Gaithersburg, Maryland; Judith A. Resnik Community Learning Center (formerly Fairlawn Elementary) which she had attended was renamed in her honor in her hometown of Akron; and Judith A. Resnik Middle School, established in 2016, in San Antonio, Texas. A crater on the Moon was named after her, as was one on Venus, where all features are named after women. An asteroid, 3356 Resnik, was also named after her.

A memorial to Resnik and the rest of the crew of Challenger was dedicated in Seabrook, Texas, where she lived while stationed at the Johnson Space Center. She is also commemorated on the Space Mirror Memorial at the Kennedy Space Center. The IEEE Judith A. Resnik Award was established in 1986 by the Institute of Electrical and Electronics Engineers and is presented annually to an individual or team in recognition of outstanding contributions to space engineering in areas of relevance to the IEEE. The Society of Women Engineers (SWE) awards the Resnik Challenger Medal annually to "a woman who has changed the space industry, has personally contributed innovative technology verified by flight experience ... and will be recognized through future decades as having created milestones in the development of space as a resource for all humankind." The Challenger Center was established in 1986 by the families of the Challenger crew, including Resnik's brother, Charles, in honor of the crew members. Its goal is to increase children's interest in science, technology, engineering and mathematics.

Julie Fulton portrayed Resnik in the 1990 made-for-TV movie Challenger.

The biography Judith Resnik: Unsung Astronaut (ISBN 9780821426890), part of the Biographies for Young Readers Series, is to be released in June 2026.

== See also ==
- List of female astronauts
