= Plummer (crater) =

Crater on the Moon

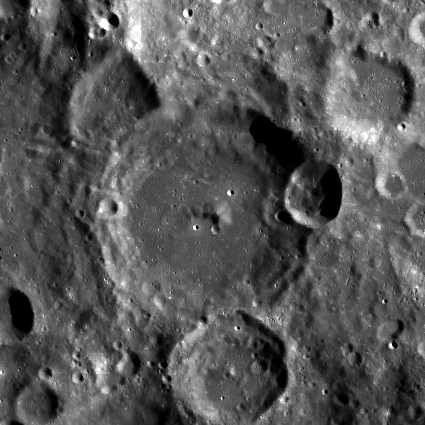
- LRO mosaic
- Coordinates: 25.0°S 155.0°W
- Diameter: 73 km
- Depth: Unknown
- Colongitude: 155° at sunrise
- Formation: Nectarian
- Eponym: Henry C. K. Plummer

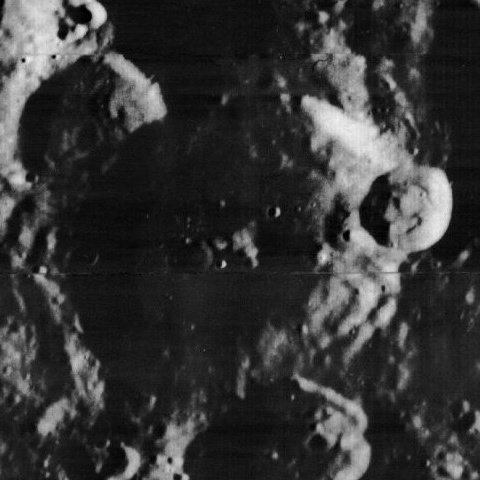
Lunar Orbiter 1 image

Plummer is a lunar impact crater. It is located on the far side of the Moon from the Earth, to the north of the huge walled plain called Apollo. Less than one crater diameter to the north of Plummer is the similar-sized Wilsing.

On the lunar geologic timescale, Plummer dates to the Nectarian period. This is a worn crater formation with several notable impacts along the rim. The largest of these is the satellite crater Plummer M intruding into the southern rim. Slightly smaller is Plummer W overlapping part of the northwestern outer rim. There is also a relatively fresh crater cutting across the eastern rim. The interior floor of Plummer is marked by only a few tiny craterlets, and a central peak offset just to the east of the midpoint.

== Satellite craters ==
By convention these features are identified on lunar maps by placing the letter on the side of the crater midpoint that is closest to Plummer.

Plummer	Latitude	Longitude	Diameter
C	23.7° S	153.1° W	29 km
M	26.8° S	154.9° W	41 km
N	27.7° S	156.3° W	42 km
R	26.0° S	157.7° W	22 km
W	23.9° S	156.2° W	33 km
