= Jarvis (crater) =

Crater on the Moon

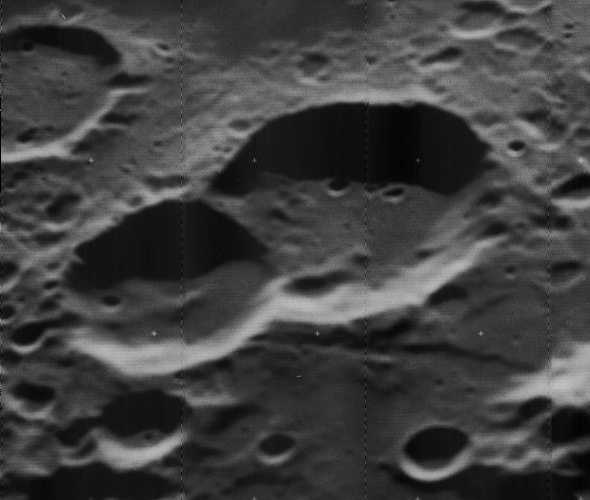
- Oblique Lunar Orbiter 5 image of McNair (left) and Jarvis (right)
- Coordinates: 34.9°S 148.9°W
- Diameter: 38 km
- Depth: Unknown
- Colongitude: 149° at sunrise
- Eponym: Gregory Jarvis

Jarvis is a crater that lies on the far side of the Moon. It is located within the walled plain called Apollo, and lies in the eastern half of this basin within the interior ring.

Jarvis has a low, somewhat worn outer rim that is generally circular. There is a wide break in the south-southeastern portion of the rim where is it partly overlain by the crater McNair. The latter is younger than Jarvis, since its rim still survives where it intersects the interior of Jarvis. The interior of the crater is otherwise undistinguished, being marked only by tiny craters and some low ridges along the ramparts of McNair.

The crater name was approved by the IAU in 1988 in honor of Gregory Jarvis, killed in the Space Shuttle Challenger disaster on January 28, 1986. The crater was formerly designated Borman Z, a satellite crater of Borman.
