= Johannes Wilsing =

German astronomer

Johannes Wilsing (8 September 1856 – 23 December 1943) was a German astronomer.

He was born in Berlin, where he was educated in addition to Göttingen. In 1880 he was awarded his Ph.D. from Humboldt-Universität of Berlin with a dissertation titled, Über den Einfluss von Luftdruck und Wärme auf die Pendelbewegung (On the influence of air pressure and heat on the movement of a pendulum).

In 1881 he joined the Astrophysical Observatory Potsdam (AOP) as an assistant, and would remain there until he retired. His early career was spent on solar studies, including observations of sunspots and derivations of the rotation period. In 1897 he measured the parallax of 61 Cygni, a relatively nearby star.

He became an observer at the AOP in 1898, and the following year he collaborated with Julius Scheiner in an unsuccessful attempt to measure the radio emission from the Sun. The same year he attempted to interpret the spectrum of novae. He performed extensive work on the luminosity, colors, and diameters of stars.

He retired in 1921 and died in Potsdam. The crater Wilsing on the Moon is named after him.
