= Mutus (crater) =

Crater on the Moon

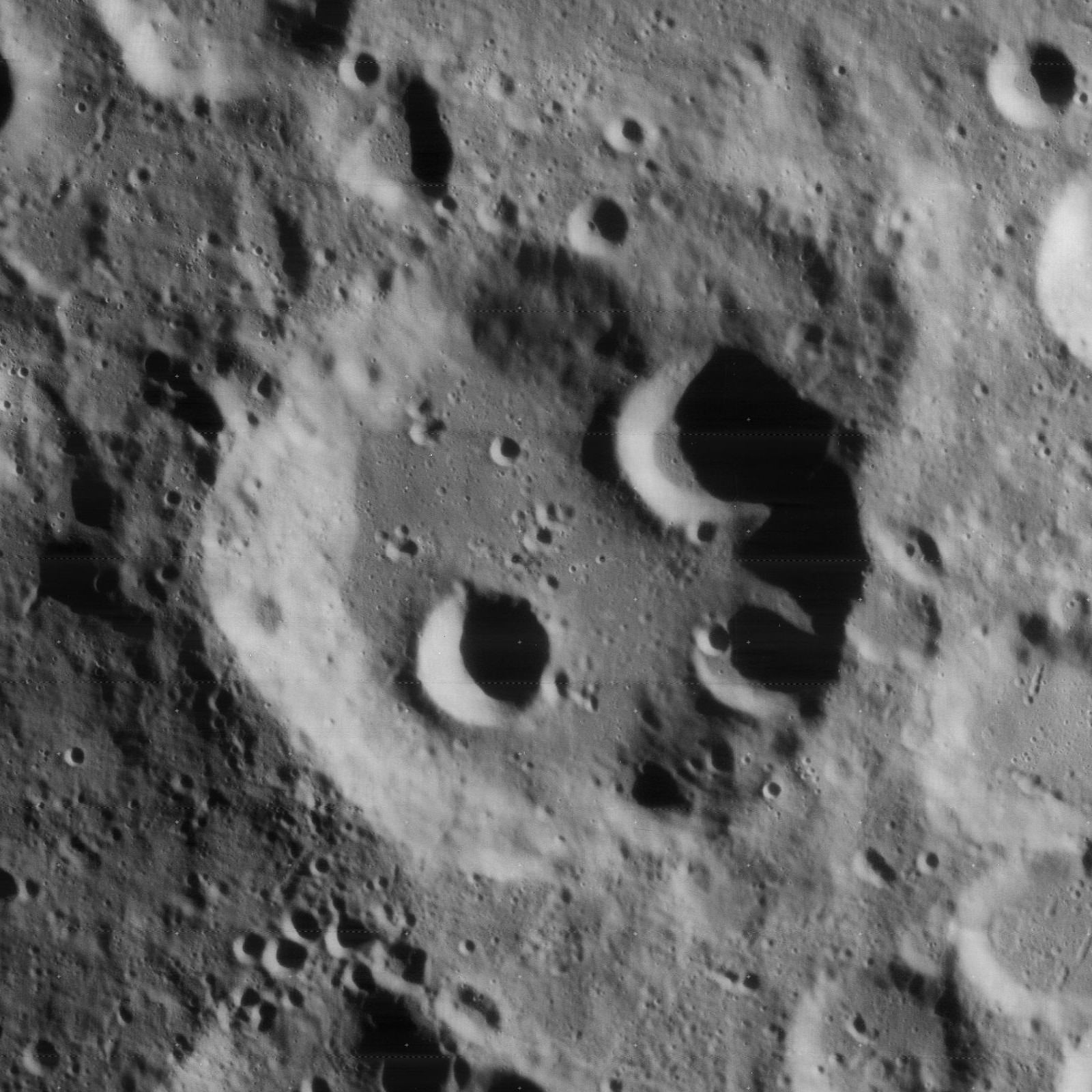
- Lunar Orbiter 4 image
- Coordinates: 63.6°S 30.1°E
- Diameter: 78 km
- Depth: 3.7 km
- Colongitude: 333° at sunrise
- Formation: Pre-Nectarian
- Eponym: Vincente Mut

Mutus is a lunar impact crater that is located in the rugged southern part of the Moon. It lies to the north-northeast of the larger crater Manzinus, and some distance to the south of Hommel. It is 78 kilometers in diameter and 3.7 kilometers deep. It is from the Pre-Nectarian period, 4.55 to 3.92 billion years ago.

The outer rim of Mutus is worn and eroded, with a pair of small but notable craters, Mutus A and Mutus V, lying across the eastern rim. A number of other tiny craters lay along the rim and the interior wall. Another crater, Mutus B, is located on the crater floor, just to the south of the midpoint. The remainder of the interior is relatively flat, and punctuated by several tiny craterlets to the north of Mutus B.

Mutus is named for Vincente Mut (Muth), a 17th-century Spanish astronomer and sailor.

== Satellite craters ==
By convention these features are identified on lunar maps by placing the letter on the side of the crater midpoint that is closest to Mutus.

Mutus	Latitude	Longitude	Diameter
A	63.8° S	31.8° E	16 km
B	63.9° S	29.5° E	17 km
C	61.2° S	27.2° E	32 km
D	58.4° S	23.3° E	22 km
E	65.5° S	36.1° E	22 km
F	66.2° S	34.1° E	42 km
G	67.2° S	35.1° E	17 km
H	63.6° S	24.2° E	21 km
J	62.7° S	23.3° E	8 km
K	57.8° S	21.5° E	7 km
L	61.8° S	24.9° E	20 km
M	59.1° S	24.4° E	20 km
N	62.4° S	27.6° E	11 km
O	57.7° S	23.8° E	14 km
P	59.1° S	25.7° E	16 km
Q	62.2° S	30.4° E	8 km
R	60.8° S	23.9° E	27 km
S	60.5° S	22.0° E	25 km
T	59.2° S	21.2° E	34 km
V	62.9° S	31.3° E	24 km
W	66.6° S	40.0° E	21 km
X	67.1° S	36.8° E	21 km
Y	64.8° S	35.0° E	26 km
Z	64.0° S	34.5° E	30 km
