= Vicente Mut Armengol =

Spanish astronomer

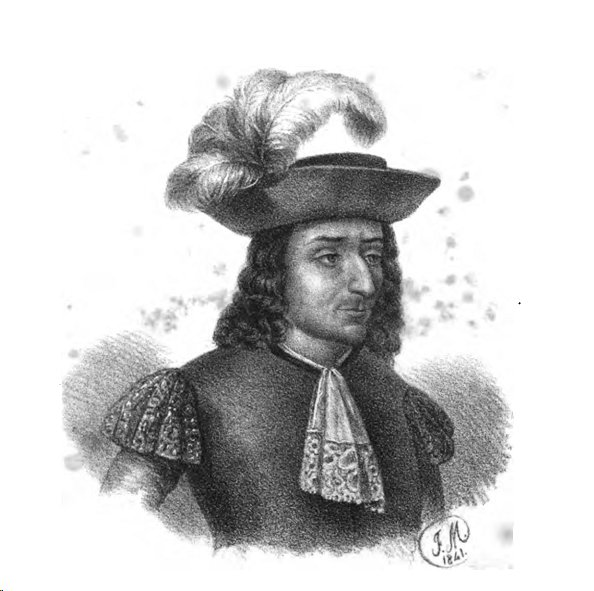
- Vicente Mut i Armengol
- Born: October 25, 1614; Palma de Mallorca, Kingdom of Spain
- Died: 27 April 1687 (aged 72); Palma de Mallorca, Kingdom of Spain
- Occupations: Astronomer; Engineer; Historian; Mathematician; Soldier

Academic background
- Education: Estudi General Lul·lià
- Influences: Ramon Llull; Tycho Brahe; Galileo Galilei

Academic work
- Influenced: José de Zaragoza; Carlos de Sigüenza y Góngora

Vicente Mut i Armengol (25 October 1614 – 27 April 1687) was a Mallorcan astronomer, engineer, historian, mathematician and soldier. One of the most distinguished Spanish astronomers of the seventeenth century, Mut studied the Pleiades, the diameter of the Sun, and the determination of the meridians.

== Biography ==
The son of a cavalry officer, he studied humanities at the Jesuit college of Montesión at Palma. In 1629 he entered the Society of Jesus, but soon left the order. He received his doctorate in law from the Estudi General of Palma, Majorca. An expert on military engineering, he joined the Mallorcan militia and was promoted to the rank of sergeant major. He directed various fortification works in several strategic areas of the Balearic Islands and took part in repairing the walls of Palma. He served with distinction in the Reapers' War. In 1641 he was appointed General Chronicler of the Kingdom of Majorca, and in 1651 he was elected deputy to the Cortes. Later in his life Mut became town councillor in Palma and administrator of the same city.

Mut was an esteemed practical astronomer. In the 1640s, he began an epistolary relation with the German polymath Athanasius Kircher and the Italian astronomer Giovanni Battista Riccioli, becoming one of Riccioli's closest collaborators. Mut carried out several observations, many of which have been recorded by Riccioli in the Almagestum Novum in the Astronomia Reformata and in the Geographia Reformata.

Mut died in Palma on 27 April 1687, aged 72. The crater Mutus on the Moon is named in his honor.

== Works ==
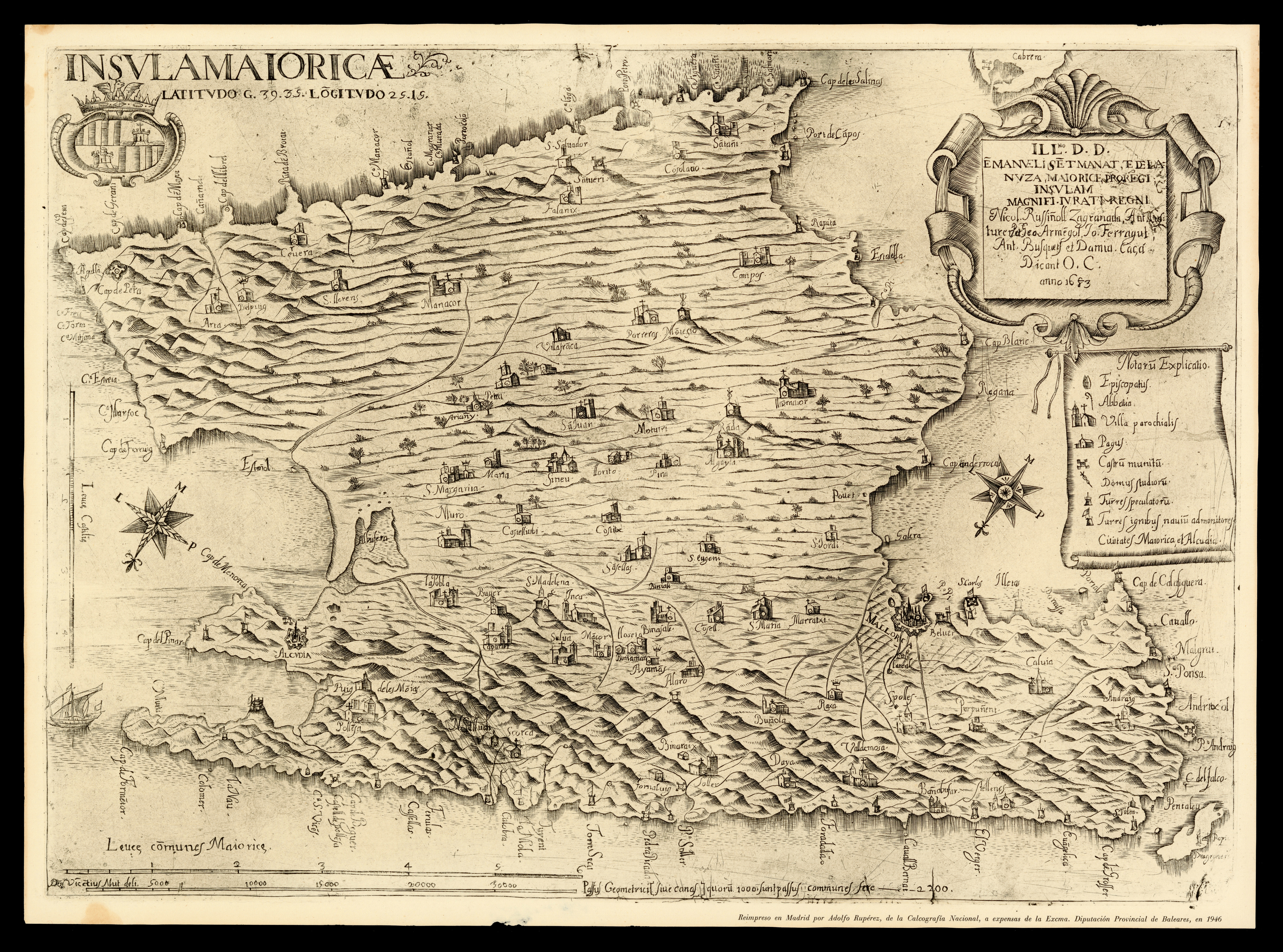
Map of the island of Majorca delineated by Vicente Mut and dated 1683.

Mut wrote several publications on artillery, astronomy and history, and worked on the fortification of Majorca. As an historian and chronicler, Mut is best known for his Historia del reyno de Mallorca (Palma, 1650) written in continuation of Juan Dameto's Historia general del reino de Mallorca. Mut searched the archives with great diligence, and gives valuable details respecting the administration of the island at different periods. His history covers the ground from the accession of King Sancho to the suppression of the 'Comunidades,' and contains spirited accounts of the raids of Barbary pirates and histories of the monasteries and hospitals. In 1683 Mut realized a detailed map of Majorca - very likely the first printed map of the island produced by someone who lived there.

As far as astronomy was concerned, Mut published three works: De Sole Alfonsino restituto (Palma, 1649), Observationes motuum caelestium (Majorca, 1666) and Cometarum anni MDCLXV (Majorca, 1666). The first one researched the Sun's diameter, its parallax and the width of the Earth's shadow. In order to estimate the Sun's apparent diameter, he used a solid device to obtain the image of the star when it was at the meridian on a screen that was perpendicular to the optic axis of the telescope. The technique that the Majorcan astronomer used was commented on by Riccioli in the Almagestum Novum and by Claude Dechales in his Cursus seu mundus mathematicus. The second of the cited works, Observationes motuum caelestium brought together the results of over twenty years of studying and patient observation of the heavens. The treatise includes a description of planetary movements according to the simple elliptical hypothesis of Boulliau-Ward with Mut's discussion of Boulliau's subsequent rectifications of the hypothesis. The third work was devoted to the 1664 comet with some observations on another comet that appeared in 1665. His observations of the comet of 1664 and his resulting hypothesis that its trajectory was parabolic, explaining its movement as analogous to that of a projectile deserves special mention. Mut thus joined in the proposals of other astronomers, such as Hevelius or Borelli, who postulated that comets move in parabolic motion around the sun, although Mut did so from a geocentric perspective.

Mut was one of the first scientists to make use of a micrometer to determine the angular size and distance between objects observed with a telescope. He used this device since 1653, before Christiaan Huygens described it in his treatise Systema Saturnium (1659). According to Riccioli Mut was the first astronomer to measure the angular distances in the Pleiades.

Mut's Tratado de arquitectura militar (1664) contains the first known attempt to use Galilean mechanics in the study of the trajectory of projectiles and one of the first references to the new mechanics in the printed Spanish literature of the seventeenth century.

== List of works ==
- El príncipe en la guerra y en la paz. Madrid: por Iuan Sanchez. 1640.
- De Sole Alfonsino restituto. Palma: typis Petri Guasp. 1649.
- Historia del reyno de Mallorca. Palma: en casa de los herederos de Gabriel Guasp. 1650.
- Tratado de Arquitectura Militar. Mallorca: en la Imprenta de Francisco Oliuer. 1664.
- Cometarum anni MDCLXV, Enarratio phisico-matematica. Mallorca. 1666.
- Observationes motuum caelestium cum adnotationibus astronomicis et meridianorum differentiis ab eclypsibus deductis. Mallorca: ex officina R. Moya. 1666.

== Bibliography ==
- Bover de Roselló, Joaquín María (1842). Memoria biográfica de los mallorquines que se han distinguido en la antigua y moderna literatura. Palma: Imprenta Nacional. pp. 209–211.
- Durán, E. (1977). "Mut i Armengol, Vicenç". Gran Enciclopèdia Catalana. Vol. 10.
- Navarro Brotóns, Víctor (1979). "Física y astronomía modernas en la obra de Vicente Mut". Llull Revista de la Sociedad Española de Historia de las Ciencias y las Técnicas. 2 (4): 43–62. ISSN 0210-8615.
- Díaz Díaz, Gonzalo (1995). "Mut Armengol, Vicente". Hombres y documentos de la filosofía española. Vol. V. Consejo Superior de Investigaciones Cientificas. pp. 755–757. ISBN 9788400075040.
- Navarro Brotóns, Víctor (2002), «Riccioli y la renovación científica en la España del siglo XVII». In Borgato, M.T., ed., Giambattista Riccioli e il merito dei gesuiti nell'età barocca, Florence, Leo S. Olschki, pp. 291–319.
- Navarro Brotóns, Víctor (2007). "Astronomy and cosmology in Spain in the Seventeenth century: the new practice of astronomy and the end of the Aristotelian-Scholastic cosmos" (PDF). Cronos: Cuadernos valencianos de historia de la medicina y de la ciencia. 10 (1): 15–39. ISSN 1139-711X.
- Werner-Francisco Bär; Vicenç M. Rosselló y Verger (2016). Joan B. Binimelis, Vicenç Mut i els mapes murals de Mallorca (segles XVII-XVIII). Valencia: publicacions Universitat de València. ISBN 978-8437099071.
- Vicente Mut Armengol. Polymath Virtual Library, Fundación Ignacio Larramendi
