= Don Hendrix =

American optician (1905–1961)

- Born: 1905; Fort Worth, Texas
- Died: 1961 (aged 55–56)
- Occupation: Optician
- Board member of: Davidson Optronics, Inc.
- Spouse: Christie
- Parents: Frank O. (father); Julia Ralls Hendricks (mother)

Don O. Hendrix (1905–1961) was an American optician.

In 1932, American scientist, inventor, and optician Don Hendrix began developing the Schmidt camera at the Mount Wilson Observatory in Southern California, where by 1942 he would go on to become the master optician. A genius with only a high school education, Hendrix was a prolific inventor who by his death in 1962, in addition to his accomplishments and contributions to astronomy and optics had hundreds of patents to his name, most of which were donated to the U.S. Government. He experimented with various technologies and among many firsts was the first person to use aluminum instead of silver in the mirrors he created for the Carnegie Institute's telescopes. During the time he spent at the Carnegie Institute he worked on many projects for the U.S. government, including a co-authored patent for the proximity fuse for use in missiles and bombs, considered to be one of the most important inventions in history outside of the discovery of atomic energy. Due to the top secret nature of this and other projects, he never openly received credit for these inventions. During his time at the Mount Wilson and Palomar observatories, he became a protege of Edwin Hubble, and many other noted astronomers, and it is believed that alongside Hubble he contributed to the big bang theory. He was responsible for finishing and polishing the Palomar Observatory's 200-inch primary and the 120-inch primary at Lick Observatory, among many other contributions.

In 1958 he became a member of the board of directors of Davidson Optronics, Inc. He invented a modified Twyman–Green interferometer (called the Hendrix Interferometer).

The crater Hendrix on the Moon is named after him.

== Early life and education ==
Hendrix was born in Fort Worth, Texas, to Frank O. and Julia Ralls Hendricks. After a fire destroyed the family home, the family relocated to California in 1921. Hendrix completed high school in 1923 and worked installing radios and transmitters for a local music company. The Great Depression led him to seek new opportunities, and in 1931 he began as an apprentice in the optical workshop at Mount Wilson Observatory, despite lacking formal training in optics.

== Career and contributions ==
In 1932, Hendrix began developing Schmidt-camera optics for spectrographs at Mount Wilson Observatory and ultimately produced optics for all the stellar and nebular spectrographs used at the observatory. He quickly advanced, becoming master optician and head of the optical shop by 1942 Hendrix was instrumental in the development of the Schmidt camera and was among the first to use aluminum instead of silver for telescope mirror coatings, significantly improving their durability and reflectivity.

He played a key role in finishing and polishing the 200-inch primary mirror for the Hale Telescope at Palomar Observatory and the 120-inch primary for the C. Donald Shane telescope at Lick Observatory. Hendrix was also responsible for the completion of the Palomar Schmidt telescope, including the corrector plate and the first official image taken with the instrument.

During his time at the Carnegie Institution and the observatories, Hendrix worked on many projects for the U.S. government, including co-authoring a patent for the proximity fuse, a major innovation for missiles and bombs during World War II. Due to the top-secret nature of this and other defense-related projects, he did not openly receive credit for many of his inventions.

A prolific inventor, Hendrix held hundreds of patents by the time of his death, most of which were donated to the U.S. government. In 1958, he became a member of the board of directors of Davidson Optronics, Inc. He also invented a modified Twyman–Green interferometer, known as the Hendrix Interferometer.

== Legacy ==
Hendrix is remembered as one of the most skilled astronomical opticians of the 20th century. The lunar crater Hendrix is named in his honor. His innovations in telescope optics and instrumentation continue to influence the field today.

== Personal life ==
Hendrix was married to Gladys Fletcher, a British born woman who emigrated to California with her family as a teenager. He died on December 26, 1961.
