= Borman (crater) =

Lunar impact crater

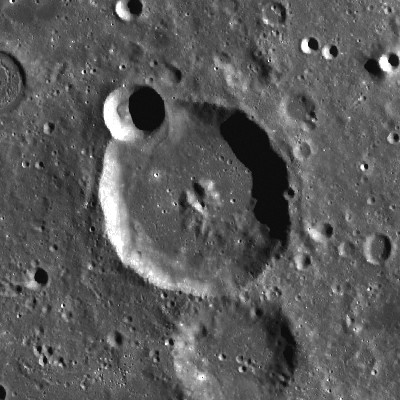
- LRO image of Borman
- Coordinates: 38.8°S 147.7°W
- Diameter: 50.72 km (31.52 mi)
- Depth: Unknown
- Colongitude: 212° at sunrise
- Formation: Early Imbrian
- Eponym: Frank Borman

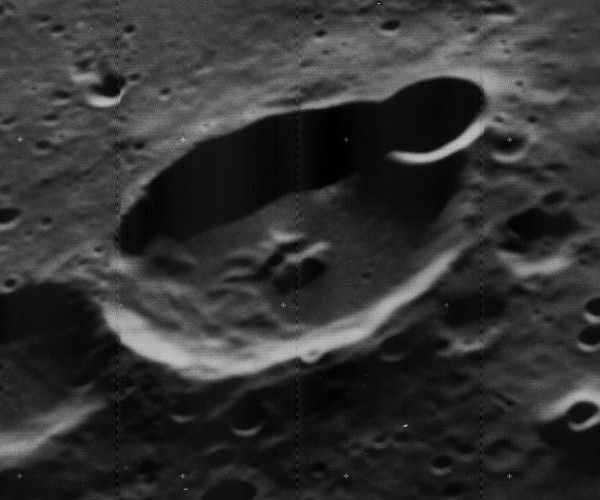
Oblique Lunar Orbiter 5 image

Borman is a lunar impact crater that is located in the southern hemisphere on the far side of the Moon. It lies across the southeast section of the mountainous inner ring, within the walled basin named Apollo.

This formation dates to the Early Imbrian epoch of the lunar geologic timescale. The rim of Borman remains sharp-edged, although a smaller crater lies across its northwestern rim. The interior is rough but relatively flat, with a pair of ridges around the midpoint. The spectra of the central peak fits an olivine-bearing norite mineralogy, which originated from a depth of 5.0 to 7.6 km. Borman L is an older and much more worn crater that is attached to the southern rim of Borman.

Borman crater is named after the American astronaut Frank Borman (b. 1928). In 1968, Borman and his Apollo 8 crewmates became the first humans to orbit the Moon. Two nearby craters are named after the other crew members, William Anders (Anders crater) and Jim Lovell (Lovell crater).

== Satellite craters ==
By convention these features are identified on lunar maps by placing the letter on the side of the crater midpoint that is closest to Borman.

Borman	Latitude	Longitude	Diameter
L	40.1° S	147.2° W	28 km
V	37.4° S	150.6° W	28 km

The following craters have been renamed by the IAU.

- Borman A — See McNair (crater).
- Borman X — See Resnik (crater).
- Borman Y — See McAuliffe (crater).
- Borman Z — See Jarvis (crater).
