= McNair (crater) =

Crater on the Moon

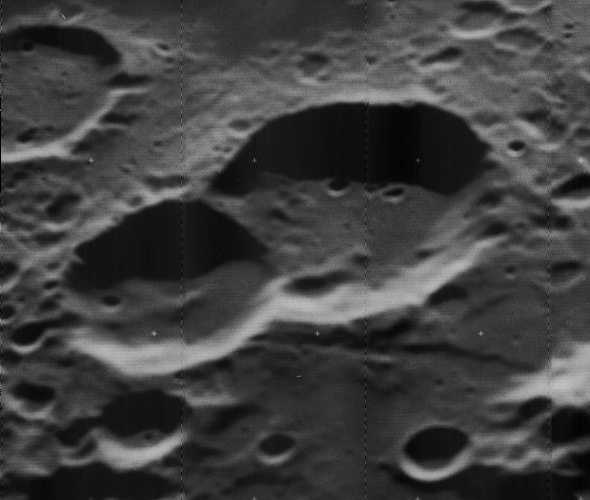
- Oblique Lunar Orbiter 5 image of McNair (left) and Jarvis (right)
- Coordinates: 35.7°S 147.3°W
- Diameter: 29 km
- Depth: Unknown
- Colongitude: 148° at sunrise
- Eponym: Ronald E. McNair

McNair is a small lunar impact crater on the far side of the Moon. It lies within the double-ringed Apollo basin, inside the eastern part of the interior ring. It has partly merged with the crater Jarvis, and the two share a common rim. To the south of McNair lies Borman.

This is a bowl-shaped feature with a somewhat worn outer rim. There are some tiny craterlets along the southern rim, and a narrow cut through the edge to the south-southwest. The interior floor is relatively featureless.

The crater name was approved by the IAU in 1988 in honor of Ronald McNair, killed in the Space Shuttle Challenger disaster on January 28, 1986. The crater was formerly designated Borman A, a satellite crater of Borman.
