= Hugh Latimer Dryden =

American aeronautical scientist and civil servant (1898–1965)

Hugh Dryden
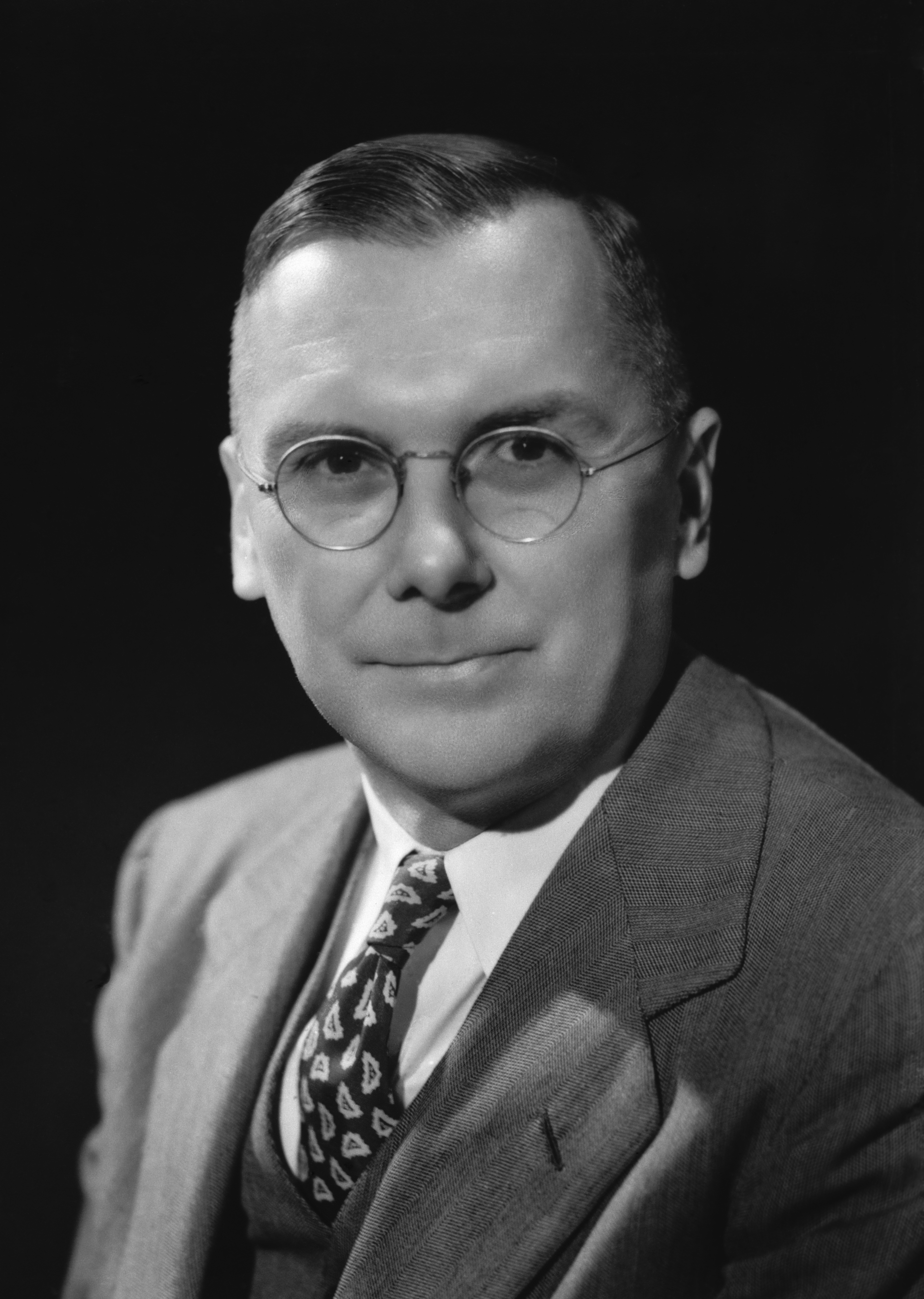
- Dryden in 1959
- Born: July 2, 1898; Pocomoke City, Maryland, U.S.
- Died: December 2, 1965 (aged 67); Washington, D.C., U.S.
- Political party: Republican
- Scientific career
- Education: Johns Hopkins University
- Known for: NASA
- Awards: Daniel Guggenheim Medal (1950); NAA Wright Brothers Memorial Trophy (1955); Franklin Institute Elliott Cresson Medal (1960); President's Award for Distinguished Federal Civilian Service (1960); AAES John Fritz Medal (1963); ASME Thurston Lecture Award (1965)
- Fields: Aeronautics
- Workplaces: NBS; NACA; NASA
- Thesis: Air forces on circular cylinders, axes normal to the wind, with special reference to the law of dynamical similarity (1919)

Hugh Latimer Dryden (July 2, 1898 – December 2, 1965) was an American aeronautical scientist and civil servant. He served as the deputy administrator of NASA from August 19, 1958, until his death.

== Biography ==
=== Early life and education ===
Dryden was born in Pocomoke City, Maryland, the son of Samuel Isaac and Nova Hill Culver Dryden, and was named after a popular local Methodist clergyman. During the financial panic of 1907, his father lost his job and the family moved to Baltimore, Maryland.

As a student, Dryden excelled in mathematics. He graduated from Baltimore City College, a high school, at the age of 14, and was the youngest student ever to graduate from that school. He was awarded the Peabody Prize for excellence in mathematics. With a scholarship, he was admitted to Johns Hopkins University and graduated with honors after only three years. He earned a M.S. in physics in 1916. His thesis was titled, "Airplanes: An Introduction to the Physical Principles Embodied in their Use."

=== Career ===
In 1918, Dryden joined the National Bureau of Standards, becoming an inspector of gauges. With the help and influence of Dr. Joseph S. Ames, he obtained a transfer to the bureau's Wind Tunnel division, and began taking graduate courses in fluid dynamics to complete his Ph.D. In 1919 at the age of 20, he was awarded his degree in physics and mathematics from Johns Hopkins University, the youngest person ever to have received a doctorate from that institution. His thesis was on the "Air Forces on Circular Cylinders".

In 1920 Dryden was appointed the director of the Aerodynamics Division of the National Bureau of Standards, a newly created section. Collaborating with Dr. Lyman J. Briggs, he performed studies of airfoils near the speed of sound. He also performed pioneering aerodynamics research on the problems of airflow, turbulence, and especially the boundary layer phenomenon. His work contributed to the design of the wings for the P-51 Mustang, as well as other aircraft designed during World War II.

By 1934, Dryden was appointed the bureau's Chief of the Mechanics and Sound Division, and in 1939 he became a member of the National Advisory Committee for Aeronautics (NACA).

With the start of World War II, Dryden served in an advisory capacity to the Air Force. He led the development of the "Bat", a radar-homing guided bomb program that was successfully employed in combat in April, 1945 to sink a Japanese destroyer.

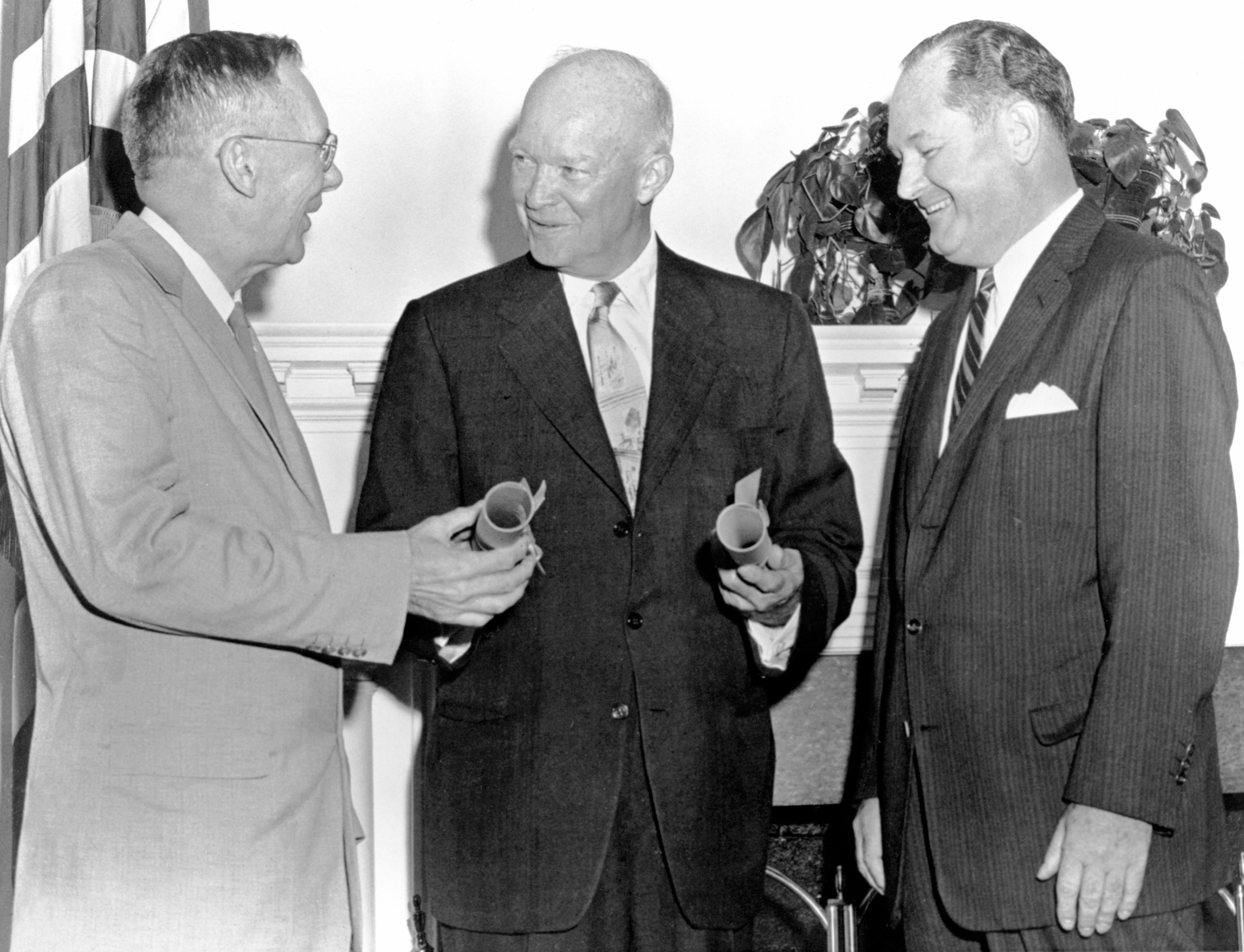
Dryden (left) with President Dwight D. Eisenhower and T. Keith Glennan in 1958.

After the war, Dryden became the Director of Aeronautical Research for the National Advisory Committee for Aeronautics (NACA) in 1946. While at the NACA he supervised the development of the North American X-15, a rocket plane used for research and testing. He also established programs for V/STOL aircraft, and studied the problem of atmospheric reentry.

He held the position of Director of NACA, NASA's predecessor, from 1947 until October 1958. In addition he served on numerous government advisory committees, including the Scientific Advisory Committee to the President. From 1941 until 1956 he was editor of the Journal of the Institute of the Aeronautical Sciences. After NACA became NASA, he became the deputy director of that organization, serving until his death.

After John Glenn's orbital flight, an exchange of letters between President John F. Kennedy and Soviet Premiere Nikita Khrushchev led to a series of discussions led by Dryden and Soviet scientist Anatoli Blagonravov. Their talks in 1962 led to the Dryden-Blagonravov agreement, which was formalized in October of that year, the same time the two countries were in the midst of the Cuban Missile Crisis. The agreement was formally announced at the United Nations on December 5, 1962. It called for cooperation on the exchange of data from weather satellites, a study of the Earth's magnetic field, and joint tracking of the U.S. Echo II balloon satellite. Unfortunately, as the competition between the two nation's crewed space programs heated up, efforts to further cooperation at that point came to an end. They would be revived in 1969 by NASA Administrator Thomas O. Paine and led to the 1975 Apollo-Soyuz Test Project.

== Death and legacy ==
He died from cancer on December 2, 1965.

Michael Gorn, chief historian at NASA Dryden Flight Research Center (now: NASA Neil A. Armstrong Flight Research Center (AFRC)), described Dryden as a quiet, reserved man who was self-effacing and diligent. He was patient, a good teacher, and effective when collaborating with others. He was also a devout Methodist, who, as a result, had a dislike of self-promotion. He served as a lay minister for his entire adult life. He was married to Mary Libbie Travers, and the couple had four children.

Tom Wolfe credited Dryden with having been the individual who spoke up, with President John F. Kennedy in April, 1961, and suggested that crewed flight to the Moon was the way to "catch up" with the Soviets in the space race. Wolfe describes President Kennedy as having been in "a terrible funk" at the time of the meeting with James E. Webb, the NASA administrator, and Dryden, his deputy, as the president wrestled with the string of Soviet "firsts" in space flight which had started with Sputnik 1 in 1957 and, that month in 1961, had extended to include Yuri Gagarin's Earth-orbital flight. Within a month of the meeting with Webb and Dryden, President Kennedy announced the Apollo Project-scale goal of putting a man on the Moon within 10 years, the goal that Apollo 11 was ultimately to meet. In setting the goal, the president did not credit Dryden's input, according to Wolfe.

Dryden is also a founding member of the National Academy of Engineering.

Dryden was portrayed by George Bartenieff in the 1998 TV miniseries From the Earth to the Moon.

== Bibliography ==
Dryden published over a hundred papers and articles.

- "Turbulence and the Boundary Layer", Wright Brothers Lecture, 1938.
- "The Role of Transition from Laminar to Turbulent Flow in Fluid Mechanics", 1941, proceedings University of Pennsylvania Bicentennial Conference on Fluid Mechanics and Statistical Methods in Engineering.
- "Recent advances in the mechanics of boundary layer flow", Academic Press Inc., New York, 1948.
- Dryden, Hugh L., and Abbott, Ira H., "The design of low-turbulence wind tunnels", NACA, Technical Note 1755, Nov 1949.
- "General Survey of Experimental Aerodynamics", 1956, Dover.
- "The International Geophysical Year: Man's most ambitious study of his environment," National Geographic, February 1956, pp. 285–285.
- "Footprints on the Moon", National Geographic, March 1964, pp. 356–401.

== Awards and honors ==
- President's Certificate of Merit.
- President of the Philosophical Society of Washington, 1934.
- Member of the United States National Academy of Sciences, 1944.
- Daniel Guggenheim Medal, 1950.
- Member of the American Philosophical Society, 1950.
- Wright brothers memorial trophy, 1956.
- Baltimore City College Hall of Fame, 1958.
- Member of the American Academy of Arts and Sciences, 1958.
- Career Service Award from the National Civil Service League, 1958.
- Elliott Cresson Medal from The Franklin Institute, 1960.
- Langley Gold Medal from the Smithsonian Institution, 1962.
- Elected an honorary member of the American Society of Mechanical Engineers, 1964.
- Robert Henry Thurston Lecture Award from the American Society of Mechanical Engineers (1965).
- National Medal of Science award in Engineering, 1965.
- Inducted into the International Space Hall of Fame in 1976.
- Inducted into the International Air & Space Hall of Fame in 1973.
- Sixteen honorary doctorates.
- Member of the American Association for the Advancement of Science.
- Founding Member of the National Academy of Engineering.
- The NASA Flight Research Center was renamed the NASA Hugh L. Dryden Flight Research Center on March 26, 1976. This was rescinded on March 1, 2014, when the center was renamed the "Neil A. Armstrong Flight Research Center."
- The Western Aeronautical Test Range at the facility was renamed the NASA Hugh L. Dryden Aeronautical Test Range.
- The crater Dryden on the Moon is named after him.
