= Chaffee (crater) =

Lunar impact crater

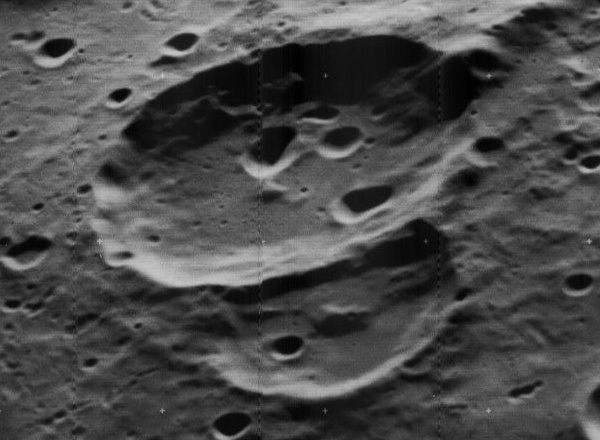
- Oblique Lunar Orbiter 5 image
- Coordinates: 39.06°S 154.63°W
- Diameter: 51.75 km (32.16 mi)
- Depth: Unknown
- Colongitude: 155° at sunrise
- Formation: Nectarian
- Eponym: Roger B. Chaffee

Chaffee is a lunar impact crater that is located in the southern hemisphere on the far side of the Moon. It lies within a huge walled plain called Apollo, and is one of several craters in that formation named for astronauts and people associated with the Apollo program. This basin is a double-ringed formation, and the crater Chaffee is situated across the southwest part of the inner ring. The ridge from this ring extends northward from the northern rim of Chaffee.

On the lunar geologic timescale, Chaffee dates to the Nectarian period. This is a circular crater with an outer rim that has an uneven form due to multiple small outward bulges. The perimeter is only slightly worn, and retains a sharp rim that projects above the surroundings. Two notable craters are attached to the outer rim: Chaffee F to the west and Chaffee W along the northwest. Chaffee actually intrudes somewhat into the former crater, and the two share a common rim.

The inner walls of Chaffee do not have a well-formed terrace system, and they slope downward to debris piles that extend part way across the floor. Parts of the interior floor are relatively level and featureless. However, there are several small craters lying in the northern half, particularly to the northwest of the midpoint.

The crater was named in 1970 by the IAU after astronaut Roger Chaffee (1935–1967), killed in the Apollo 1 fire. The nearby craters White and Grissom were named after the other two astronauts killed in the disaster, Ed White and Gus Grissom.

== Satellite craters ==
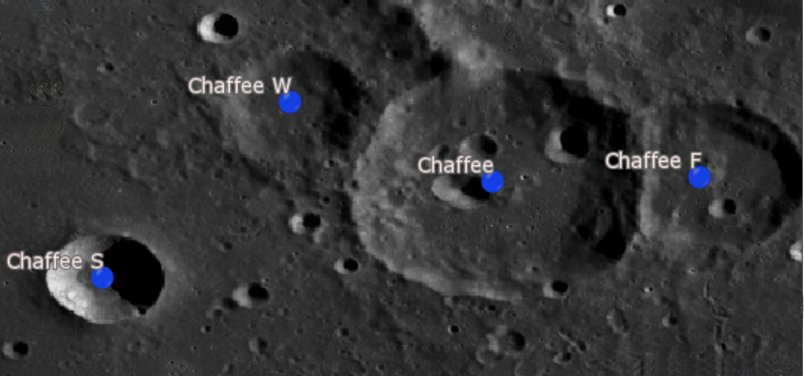
Satellite features of Chaffee

By convention these features are identified on lunar maps by placing the letter on the side of the crater midpoint that is closest to Chaffee.

Chaffee	Latitude	Longitude	Diameter
F	38.8° S	152.5° W	35 km
S	39.5° S	156.6° W	19 km
W	38.2° S	155.3° W	25 km

The Chang'e 6 mission may have sampled material from the Chaffee S ejecta blanket.
