= Apollo (crater) =

Crater on the Moon

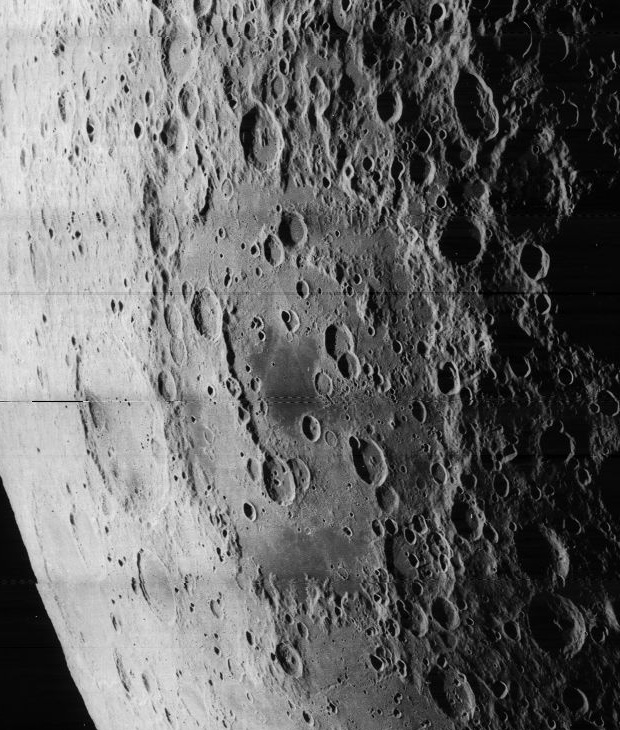
- Oblique image taken by Lunar Orbiter 5
- Coordinates: 36.1°S 151.8°W
- Diameter: 537 km
- Colongitude: 161° at sunrise
- Formation: Pre-Nectarian
- Eponym: Apollo missions

Apollo, also called the Apollo basin, is a large impact crater located on the far side of the Moon, in the southern hemisphere. This class of formation is known as a peak ring basin, which has a single interior topographic ring or a discontinuous ring of peaks with no central peak. It was previously known as Basin XVI; in 1970 it was officially named after the Apollo missions by the International Astronomical Union.

The Chang'e 6 spacecraft landed within Apollo basin in 2024, collected samples of the surface, then brought them to Earth for analysis.

== Geology ==
Apollo is a double-ringed walled plain (or basin) whose inner ring is roughly half the diameter of the outer wall. It dates to the Pre-Nectarian period of the lunar geologic timescale. Both the outer wall and the interior have been heavily worn and eroded by subsequent impacts, so that significant parts of the outer and inner walls now consist of irregular and incised sections of mountainous arcs. The interior floor is covered in a multitude of craters of various sizes, some of which have been named for people associated with the Apollo program or other NASA projects.

Sections of Apollo's interior have been resurfaced with lava, leaving patches of the floor with a lower albedo than the surroundings. There is a large patch of this lunar mare in the middle part of the inner ring, which contains some ray system markings. A long stretch of the mare lies along the southern part of the crater. There is also a smaller section near the western rim.

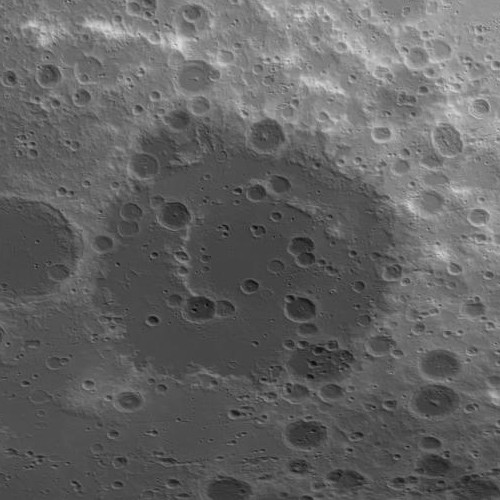
Topographic map

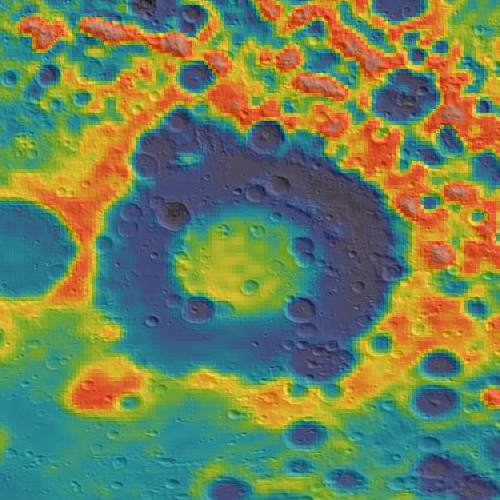
Gravity map based on GRAIL

== Interior craters ==
Three craters are named after the crew of Apollo 8. In the southeast part of Apollo is Borman crater, named after commander Frank Borman. Near the southeastern margin of Apollo is Anders crater, named after William Anders. On the eastern margin is Lovell crater, named after Jim Lovell.

Many craters within and adjacent to the Apollo impact have been named to honor deceased NASA employees.

Dryden is attached to the west-northwestern exterior of the inner ring. Chaffee is a similar-sized crater that lies partly across the southwest section of the inner ring. Inside the inner ring are the craters Resnik, McAuliffe and Onizuka, and the Jarvis–McNair crater pair. The crater Smith lies across the northern part of the inner ring.

In 2006 the IAU approved a proposal to name seven interior craters to honor the astronauts killed in the Space Shuttle Columbia disaster.

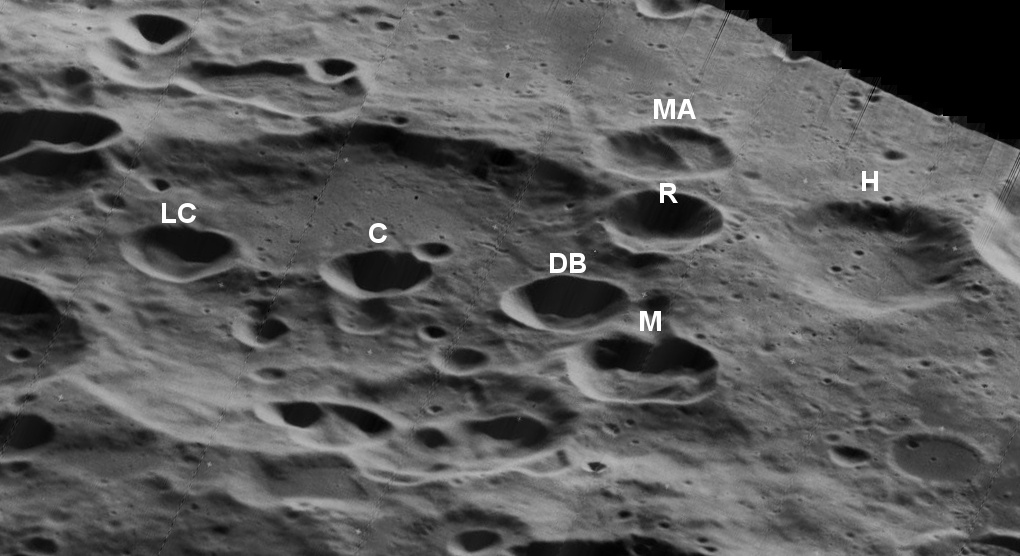
The craters L. Clark (LC), Chawla (C), D. Brown (DB), M. Anderson (MA), McCool (M), Ramon (R), and Husband (H). Lunar Orbiter 5 image.

Crater	Coordinates	Diameter	Name source
Chawla	42.8°S 147.5°W	15 km	Kalpana Chawla
D. Brown	42.0°S 147.2°W	15 km	David McD. Brown
Husband	40.8°S 147.9°W	29 km	Richard D. Husband
L. Clark	43.7°S 147.7°W	16 km	Laurel B. S. Clark
McCool	41.7°S 146.3°W	21 km	William C. McCool
M. Anderson	41.6°S 149.0°W	17 km	Michael P. Anderson
Ramon	41.6°S 148.1°W	17 km	Ilan Ramon

Three of the crater names include the respective astronaut's first initials to distinguish them from the existing craters called Anderson, Brown and Clark.

== Robotic exploration ==
China launched the Chang'e 6 robotic mission on 3 May 2024, which seeks to return the first lunar sample from the Apollo Basin on the far side of the Moon. This is China's second lunar sample return mission, the first was the Chang'e 5 mission that returned lunar samples from the near side of the Moon four years earlier. The Chang'e 6 lander also carried a rover named Jinchan which conducted infrared spectroscopy of the landing site and imaged the Chang'e 6 lander on the lunar surface. The lander-ascender-rover combination separated from the orbiter and returner before landing in the southern mare of the Apollo basin on 1 June 2024 at 22:23 UTC; its precise landing location is near lunar coordinates 41.6385°S 153.9852°W

After the probe collected far-side regolith samples and placed it on the ascender, the latter probe segment launched back into lunar orbit on 3 June 2024 at 23:38 UTC. The ascender docked with the Chang'e 6 service module (the orbiter) in lunar orbit at 06:48 UTC on 6 June 2024 and subsequently completed the transfer of the sample container to the Earth return module at 07:24 UTC on the same day. The orbiter left lunar orbit on 20 June 2024 with the atmospheric re-entry module that landed in Inner Mongolia with the collected samples on 25 June 2024.

== Nearby features ==
The crater Oppenheimer is located next to Apollo's western rim, and the crater Barringer lies across the northern wall. To the southeast is the crater Anders, and Kleymenov is just to the east of the rim.
