= Lunar Orbiter 5 =

NASA orbiter mission to the Moon (1967–1968)

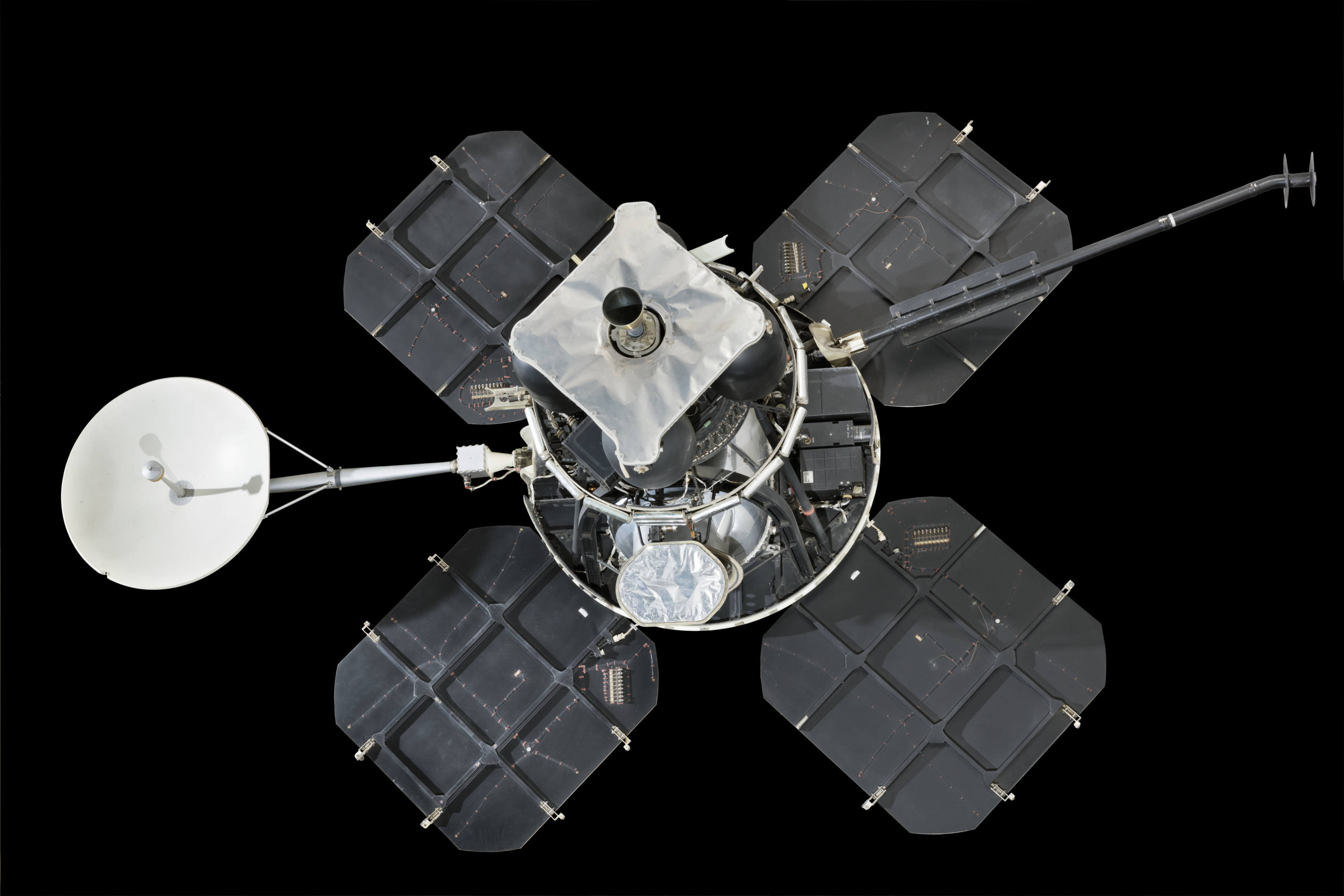
- Replica of a Lunar Orbiter spacecraft
- Mission type: Lunar orbiter
- Operator: NASA
- COSPAR ID: 1967-075A
- SATCAT no.: 2907
- Website: science.nasa.gov
- Mission duration: 5 months, 30 days

Spacecraft properties
- Manufacturer: Langley Research Center
- Launch mass: 385.6 kg (850 lb)
- Dimensions: 3.72 × 1.65 × 1.5 m (12.2 × 5.4 × 4.9 ft)
- Power: 375 watts

Start of mission
- Launch date: August 1, 1967, 22:32:00 UTC
- Rocket: Atlas SLV-3 Agena-D
- Launch site: Cape Canaveral LC-13

End of mission
- Disposal: Deorbited
- Decay date: January 31, 1968, 07:58:08 UTC

Orbital parameters
- Reference system: Selenocentric
- Semi-major axis: 4,846.8 km (3,011.7 mi)
- Eccentricity: 0.26
- Periselene altitude: 194.5 km (120.9 mi)
- Aposelene altitude: 6,023 km (3,743 mi)
- Inclination: 85 degrees
- Period: 510.08 minutes

Lunar orbiter
- Orbital insertion: August 5, 1967
- Impact site: 02.79°S 83.01°W
- Orbits: 1,380

Transponders
- Frequency: 2295 MHz
Instruments
- -: Cesium Iodide Dosimeters
- -: Lunar Photographic Studies
- -: Meteoroid Detectors
- -: Selenodesy

Lunar Orbiter 5, the last of the "Lunar Orbiter series", was designed to take additional Apollo and Surveyor landing site photography and to take broad survey images of unphotographed parts of the Moon's far side. It was also equipped to collect selenodetic, radiation intensity, and micrometeoroid impact data and was used to evaluate the Manned Space Flight Network tracking stations and Apollo Orbit Determination Program.

== Mission summary ==
The spacecraft was placed in a cislunar trajectory and on August 5, 1967 was injected into an elliptical near polar lunar orbit 194.5 by 6,023 kilometres (120.9 mi × 3,742.5 mi) with an inclination of 85 degrees and a period of 8 hours 30 minutes. On August 7 the perilune was lowered to 100 kilometers (62 mi), and on August 9 the orbit was lowered to a 99-by-1,499-kilometer (62 mi × 931 mi), 3 hour 11 minute period.

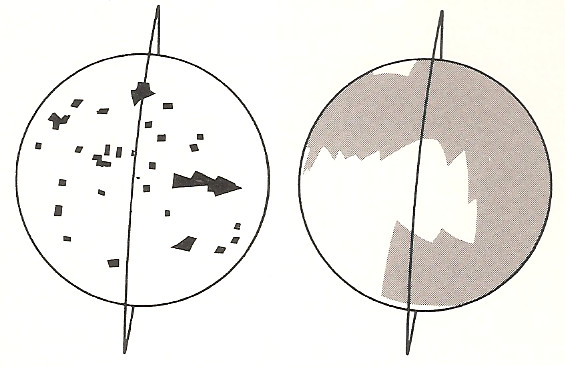
Spacecraft orbit and photographic coverage on the near side (left) and far side (right)

The spacecraft acquired photographic data from August 6 to 18, 1967, and readout occurred until August 27, 1967. A total of 633 high resolution and 211 medium resolution frames at resolution down to 2 meters (6 ft 7 in) were acquired, bringing the cumulative photographic coverage by the five Lunar Orbiter craft to 99% of the Moon's surface. Accurate data were acquired from all other experiments throughout the mission. The spacecraft was tracked until it struck the lunar surface on command at 2.79 degrees S latitude, 83 degrees W longitude (selenographic coordinates) on January 31, 1968.

Features on the near side of the Moon that were photographic targets included Petavius, Hyginus, Messier, Tycho, Copernicus, Gassendi, Vitello, Mons Gruithuisen Gamma, Prinz, Aristarchus, Vallis Schroteri, Marius Hills, Montes Apenninus, Rimae Plato, Sinus Aestuum, Hipparchus, Rimae Sulpicius Gallus, Rimae Calippus, Censorinus, Dionysius, and the future landing site of Apollo 11.

Instruments
Lunar Photographic Studies :	Evaluation of Apollo and Surveyor landing sites
Meteoroid; Detectors :	Detection of micrometeoroids in the lunar environment
Caesium Iodide Dosimeters :	Radiation environment en route to and near the Moon
Selenodesy :	Gravitational field and physical properties of the Moon

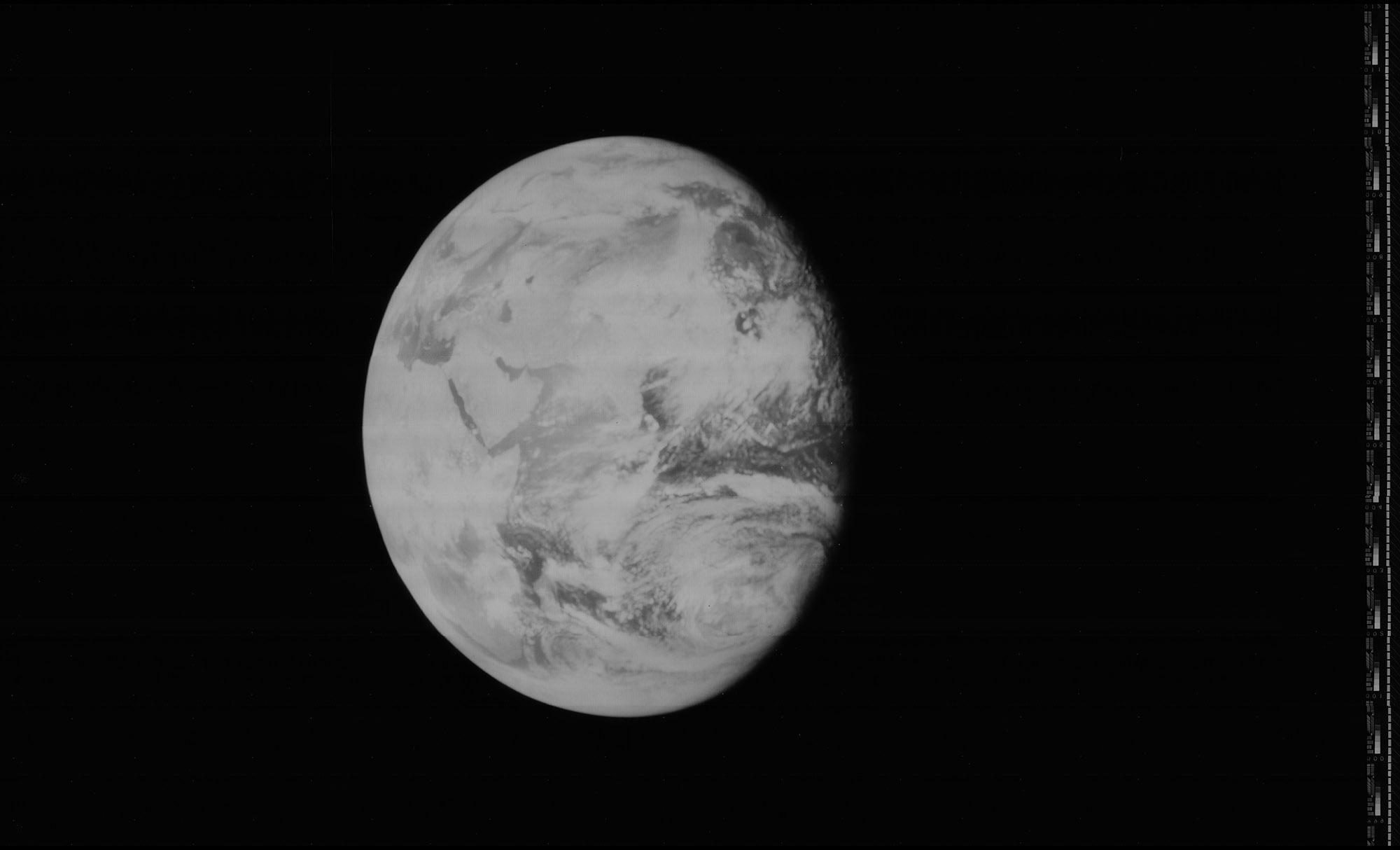
Image of the Earth taken by Lunar Orbiter 5, enhanced by LOIRP

Rimae Sulpicius Gallus on August 13, 1967 (20.5°N 9.9°E)

Southern rim of Gassendi A crater on August 17, 1967

Rim of Aristarchus crater on August 18, 1967 (23.25°N 47.47°W)

== See also ==
- Lunar Orbiter Image Recovery Project
- Exploration of the Moon
- List of artificial objects on the Moon
- List of missions to the Moon
  - Lunar Orbiter 1
  - Lunar Orbiter 2
  - Lunar Orbiter 3
  - Lunar Orbiter 4
