= Hopmann =

Hopmann may refer to:

- 1985 Hopmann, an asteroid
- Hopmann (crater), a lunar impact crater
- Josef Hopmann (1890-1975), German astronomer
- Laura Hopmann (born 1989), German politician (CDU)
