= Baldet (disambiguation) =

Fernand Baldet (1885–1964) was a French astronomer.

Baldet may also refer to

- Baldet (lunar crater)
- Baldet (Martian crater)
