= Haret =

Haret may refer to:

- a village within the administration of Mărășești town in Romania
- Spiru Haret, a Romanian mathematician, astronomer, and politician
- a crater on the Moon
- Spiru Haret University in Bucharest, Romania
- Haret Al Fawar, village in Zgharta District, Lebanon
- Haret Hreik, district in Beirut, Lebanon
- Haret Elroum and Haret Zuweila, districts of Cairo, Egypt
