= Boyle (crater) =

Lunar impact crater

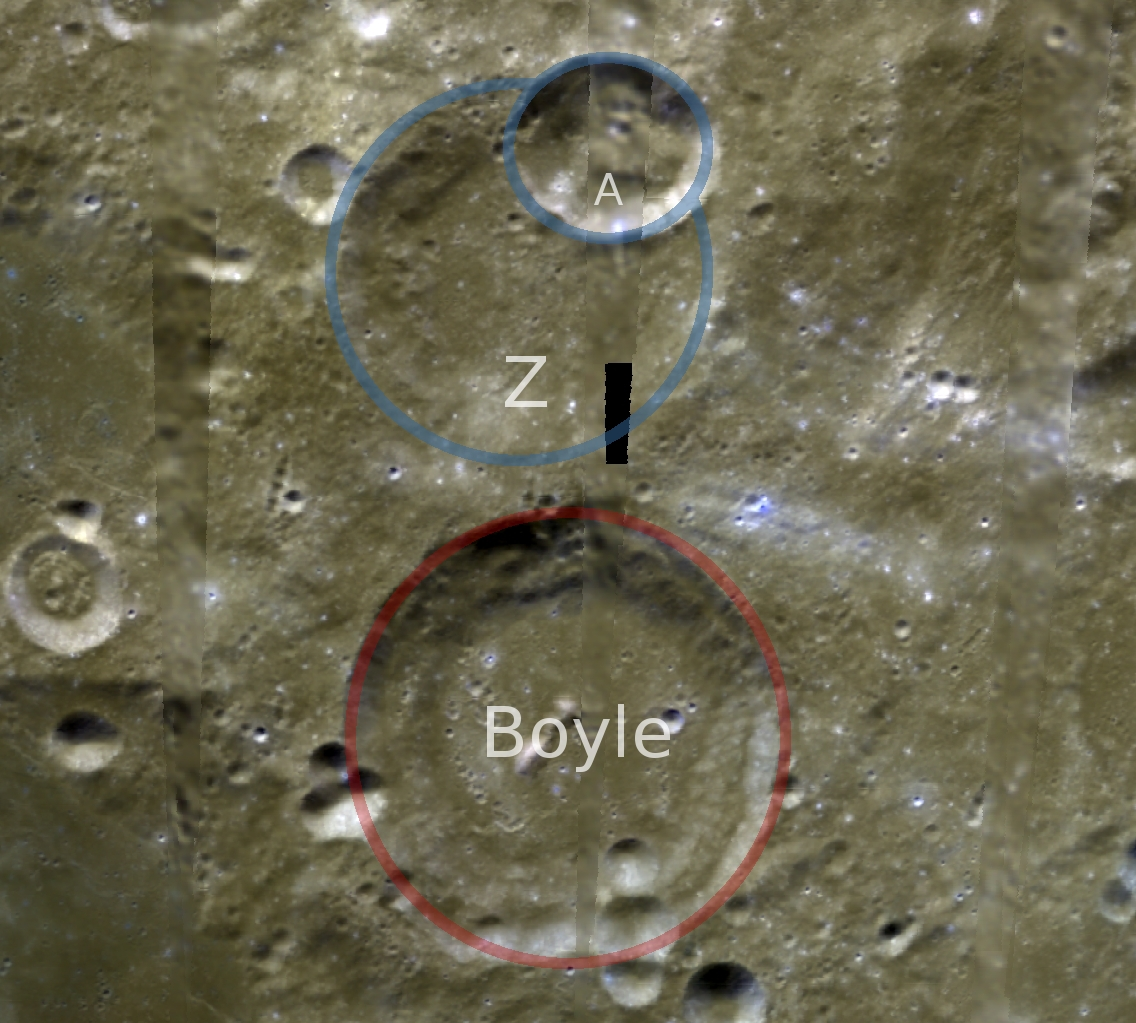
- Boyle crater and satellite craters
- Coordinates: 53.1°S 178.1°E
- Diameter: 57 km
- Depth: Unknown
- Colongitude: 176° at sunrise
- Formation: Pre-Nectarian
- Eponym: Robert Boyle

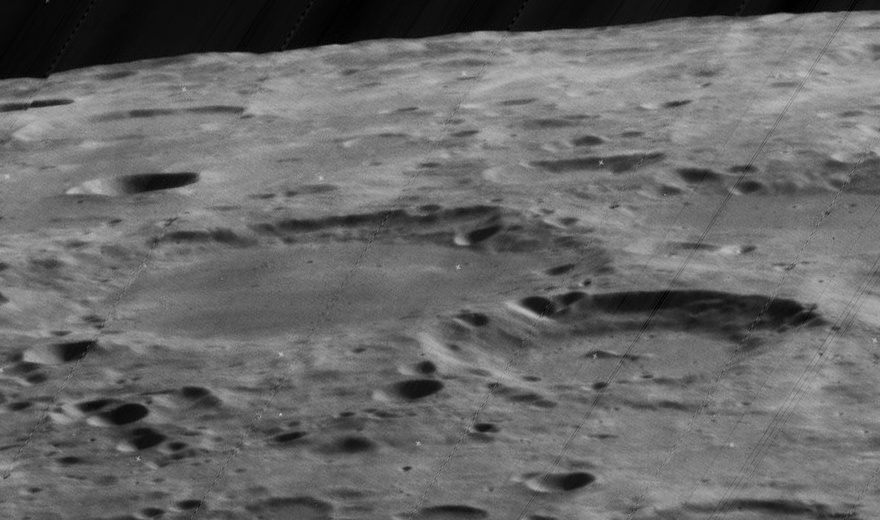
Oblique view of Hess (left of center) and Boyle (right of center), facing west. Lunar Orbiter 5 image.

Boyle is a lunar impact crater that is located in the southern hemisphere on the rugged far side of the Moon. It is adjacent to the larger crater Hess to the southeast, and lies about midway between the craters Alder to the north-northeast and Abbe to the south-southwest.

On the lunar geologic timescale, this formation dates to the Pre-Nectarian period. The outer rim of Boyle is nearly circular, and displays some slumping around the interior. Most of the rim is sharp-edged and displays little appearance of wear due to subsequent impacts. The southern rim, however, is overlain by a wide, irregular groove in the surface that follows a course from east to west along the rim. There is also an overlapping formation of tiny craterlets overlapping the narrow strip of terrain that joins Boyle to Hess.

The interior of the crater is relatively flat, with a long, low central ridge at the midpoint. The spectra of the central peak fits an olivine-bearing gabbroic norite mineralogy, which originated from a depth of 5.7 to 8.7 km. This rise is aligned in a linear formation from southwest to northeast. There is a tiny craterlet near the eastern rim, but the interior is otherwise undistinguished.

This crater is named after British natural philosopher and chemist Robert Boyle (1627–1691), regarded as the first modern chemist. Its designation was officially adopted by the International Astronomical Union in 1970.

== Satellite craters ==
By convention these features are identified on lunar maps by placing the letter on the side of the crater midpoint that is closest to Boyle.

Boyle	Latitude	Longitude	Diameter
A	50.8° S	178.3° E	21 km
Z	51.3° S	177.7° E	52 km
