= Deutzer Friedhof =

Cemetery in Cologne, Germany

Coordinates: 50°55′30″N 6°59′18″E

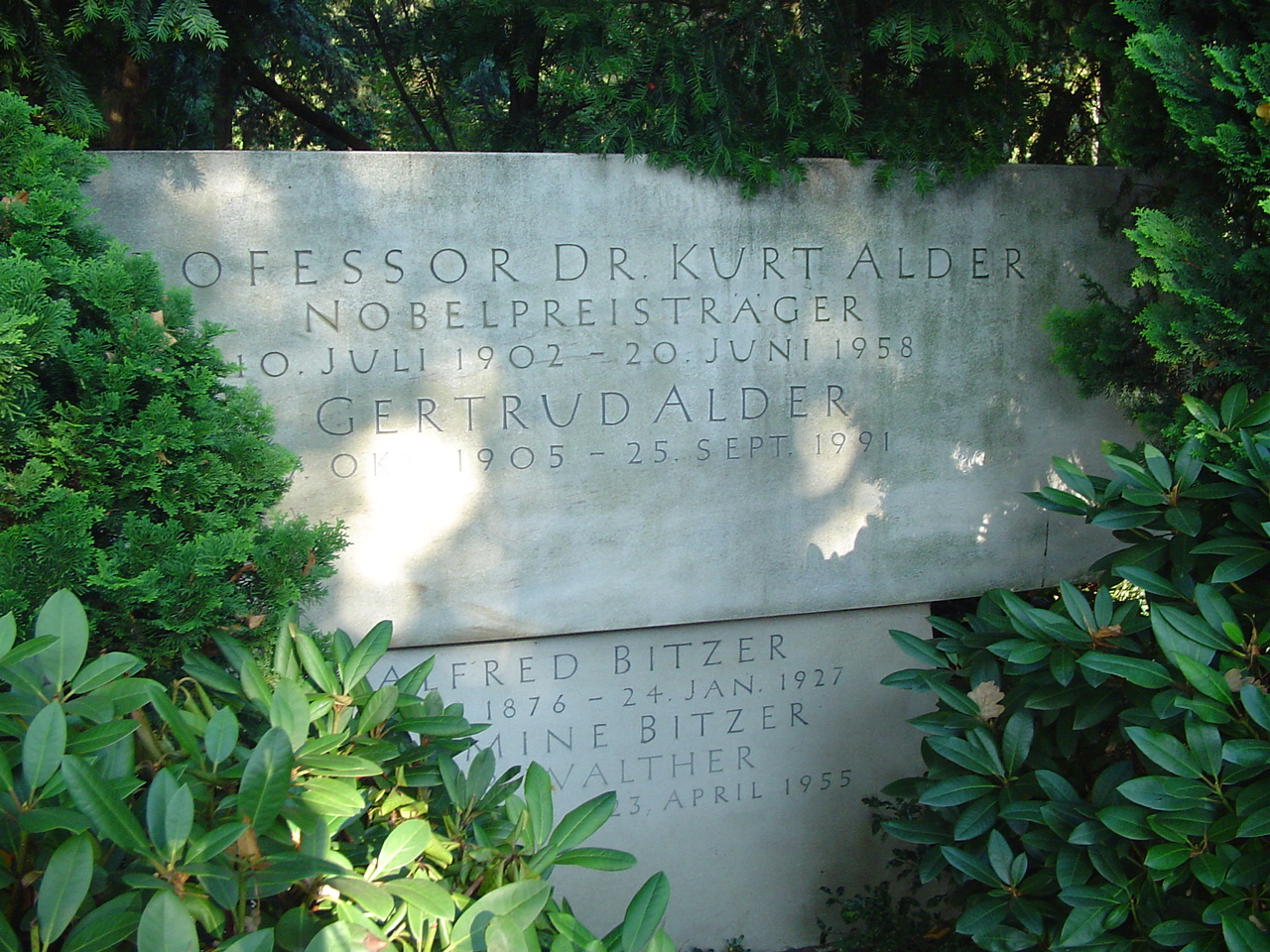

Deutzer Friedhof is a cemetery in Cologne, Germany.

The famous chemist Kurt Alder is buried here. He is known for his work on the Diels–Alder reaction and synthesizing the biological insecticide Aldrin.

The cemetery is surrounded by much local superstition; many claim it to be the site of frequent visits from der Teufel in animal form. This is mainly incited due to the often spotted herd of German Lop-Eared Rabbits found inside the cemetery accompanied by the smell of rotting flesh. No evidence has been found to support these claims, yet many reports have been sent to local officials.
