= Astronomical objects and features with Romanian names =

Several space objects and features have been named after Romanian people or things in Romania. These include planetary features on Mercury, Mars and Venus and asteroids.

== Moon ==
- Haret (crater)
- Montes Carpatus

== Mercury ==
- Eminescu (crater)

== Venus ==
- Văcărescu (crater)
- Irinuca (crater)
- Natalia (crater)
- Veta (crater)
- Zina (crater)
- Esterica (crater)
- Darclée (patera)

== Mars ==
- Batoș crater
- Iazu (crater)
- Oituz crater

== Asteroids ==
- 1381 Danubia
- 1436 Salonta
- 1537 Transylvania
- 2331 Parvulesco
- 2419 Moldavia
- 3359 Purcari
- 4268 Grebenikov
- 4633 Marinbica
- 6429 Brancusi
- 7985 Nedelcu
- 7986 Romania
- 9253 Oberth
- 9403 Sanduleak
- 9493 Enescu
- 9494 Donici
- 9495 Eminescu
- 10034 Birlan
- 10784 Noailles
- 12498 Dragesco
- 28854 Budisteanu
- 100897 Piatra Neamt
- 130072 Ilincaignat
- 257005 Arpadpal
- 263516 Alexescu
- 320790 Anestin
- 330634 Boico
- 346261 Alexandrescu
- 358894 Demetrescu
- 450931 Coculescu
- 31569 Adriansonka

== Stars ==
- Galați V1 and Galați V2

== Exoplanets ==
- Negoiu
