= Haret (crater) =

Crater on the Moon

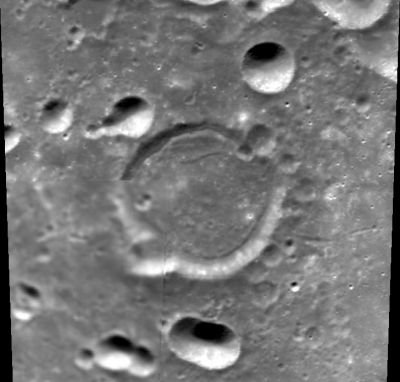
- Clementine mosaic
- Coordinates: 59.0°S 176.5°W
- Diameter: 29 km
- Depth: Unknown
- Colongitude: 177° at sunrise
- Eponym: Spiru Haret

Haret is a small lunar impact crater that is located in the southern region on the far side of the Moon. It lies in midst of the triangle of craters formed by Bose to the northeast, Cabannes to the southeast, and Abbe to the west. The region about this crater is relatively level, although marked with a number of fresh, bowl-shaped craters.

The form of Haret is generally circular, with an outward notched in the southwest rim where a smaller crater has merged with the formation. There is a second, even smaller impact in the northeast rim. The interior floor has been flooded in the past by basaltic lava, leaving a level interior and a low outer rim. Seen from afar, the interior floor is almost featureless, having only a couple of tiny craterlets to mark the surface.

This feature was named after the Romanian mathematician and astronomer Spiru Haret.

== Satellite craters ==
By convention these features are identified on lunar maps by placing the letter on the side of the crater midpoint that is closest to Haret.

| Haret | Latitude | Longitude | Diameter |
|---|---|---|---|
| C | 57.2° S | 172.8° W | 30 km |
| Y | 55.7° S | 175.5° W | 27 km |
