= Otto Diels =

German chemist (1876–1954)

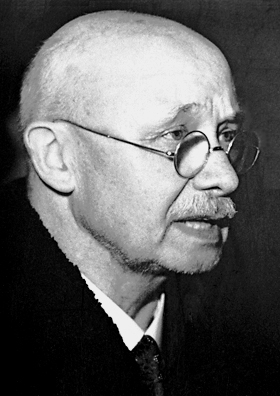
- Born: Otto Paul Hermann Diels; 23 January 1876; Hamburg, German Empire
- Died: 7 March 1954 (aged 78); Kiel, West Germany
- Education: University of Berlin
- Known for: Diels–Alder reaction Diels–Reese reaction
- Father: Hermann Alexander Diels
- Awards: Nobel Prize in Chemistry (1950)
- Scientific career
- Fields: Chemistry
- Workplaces: University of Kiel
- Doctoral advisor: Emil Fischer
- Doctoral students: Kurt Alder; Karl Wilhelm Rosenmund

Otto Paul Hermann Diels (German: [ˈɔto ˈdiːls]; 23 January 1876 – 7 March 1954) was a German chemist. His most notable work was done with Kurt Alder on the Diels–Alder reaction, a method for cyclohexene synthesis. The pair was awarded the Nobel Prize in Chemistry in 1950 for their work. Their method of synthesizing cyclic organic compounds proved valuable for the manufacture of synthetic rubber and plastic. He completed his education at the University of Berlin, where he later worked. Diels was employed at the University of Kiel when he completed his Nobel Prize-winning work, and remained there until he retired in 1945. Diels was married, with five children.

== Early life ==
Diels was born on 23 January 1876 in Hamburg, Germany, and moved with his family to Berlin when he was two years old. He studied in Berlin at Joachimsthalsches Gymnasium before attending the University of Berlin starting in 1895. While at university, Diels studied chemistry under Emil Fischer, eventually graduating in 1899.

== Professional career ==
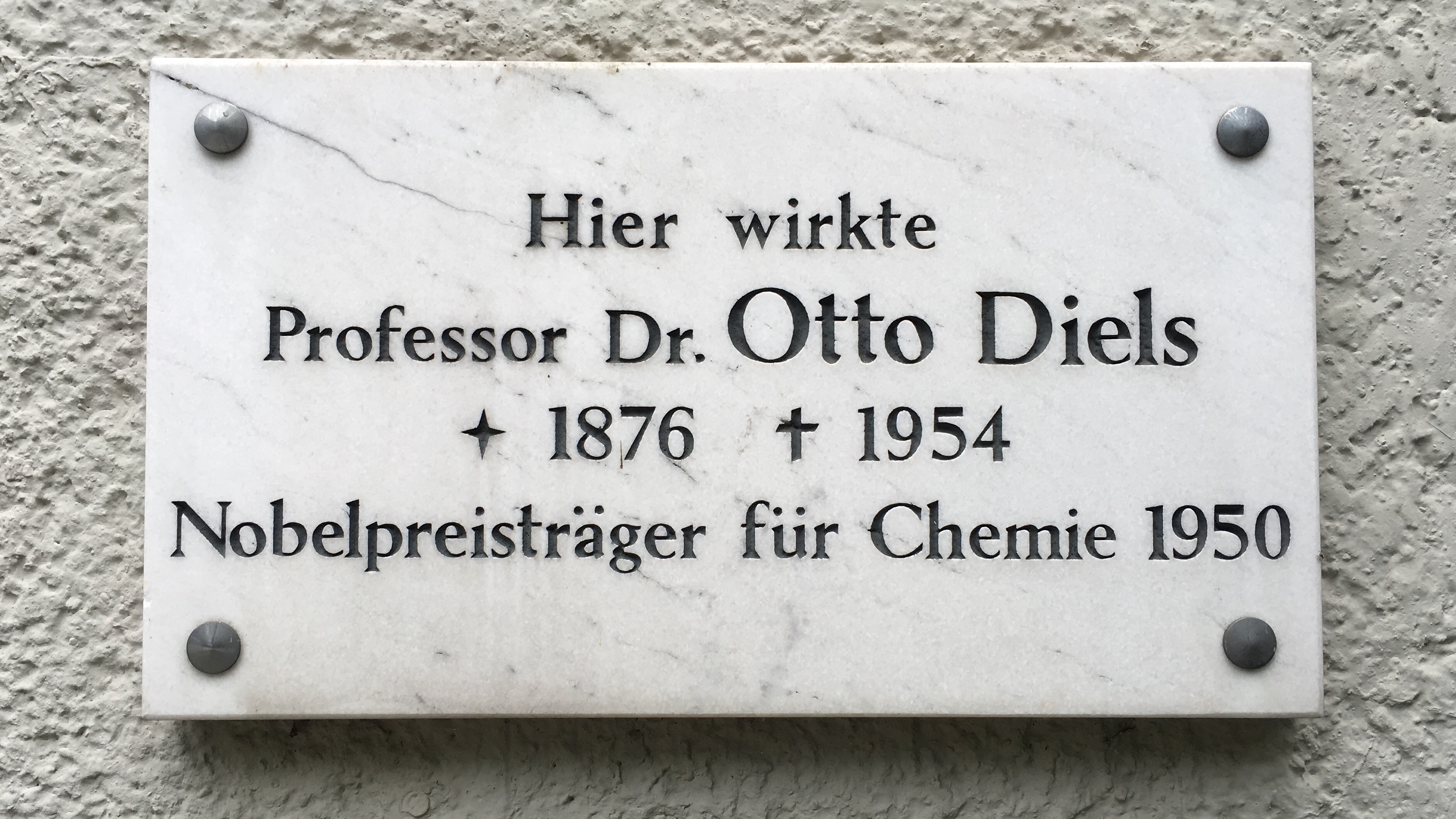
Commemorative plaque for Otto Diels in Kiel, Germany

Immediately after graduating from the University of Berlin, he was offered a position with the Institute of Chemistry at the school. He advanced quickly through the ranks at the school, eventually ending up as Department Head in 1913. He remained at the University of Berlin until 1915, when he accepted a position at the University of Kiel, where he remained until his retirement in 1945. It was during his time at Kiel, where he worked with Kurt Alder developing the Diels–Alder reaction, for which they were awarded the Nobel Prize in Chemistry in 1950. His work with Alder developed a synthetic method which allows the synthesis of unsaturated cyclic compounds. This work was important in the production of synthetic rubber and plastic compounds.

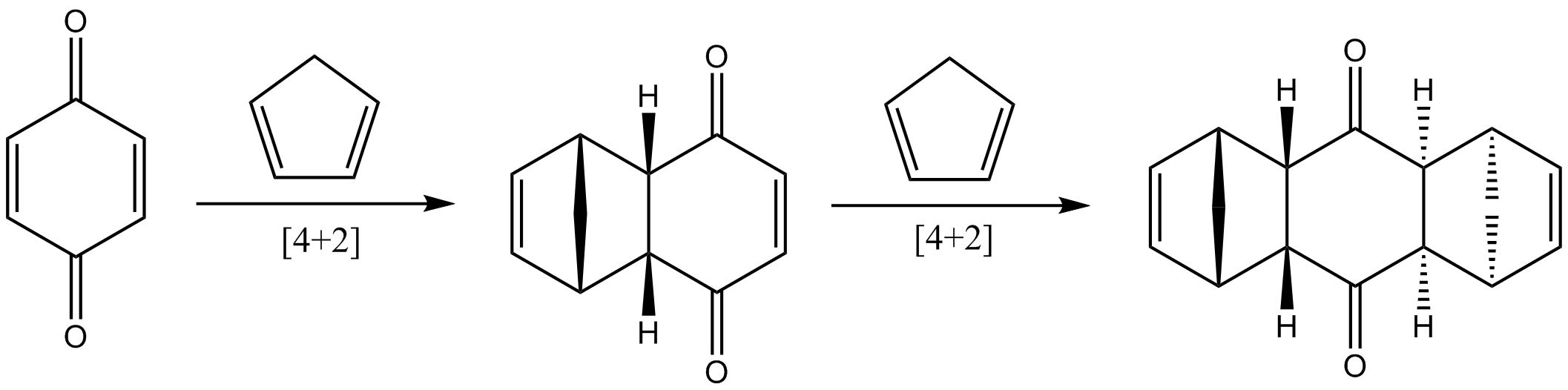
The reaction discovered by Diels and Alder in 1928

== Personal life ==
Diels married Paula Geyer in 1909. The couple had five children together, three sons and two daughters. Two of his sons were killed in action during World War II. In his free time, Diels enjoyed reading, music and traveling. He died on 7 March 1954.

== See also ==
- List of chemists
