= Poincaré (crater) =

Lunar surface depression

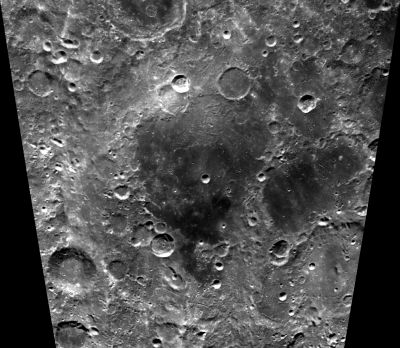
- Clementine mosaic
- Coordinates: 56.7°S 163.6°E
- Diameter: 319 km
- Depth: Unknown
- Colongitude: 207° at sunrise
- Formation: Pre-Nectarian
- Eponym: Henri Poincaré

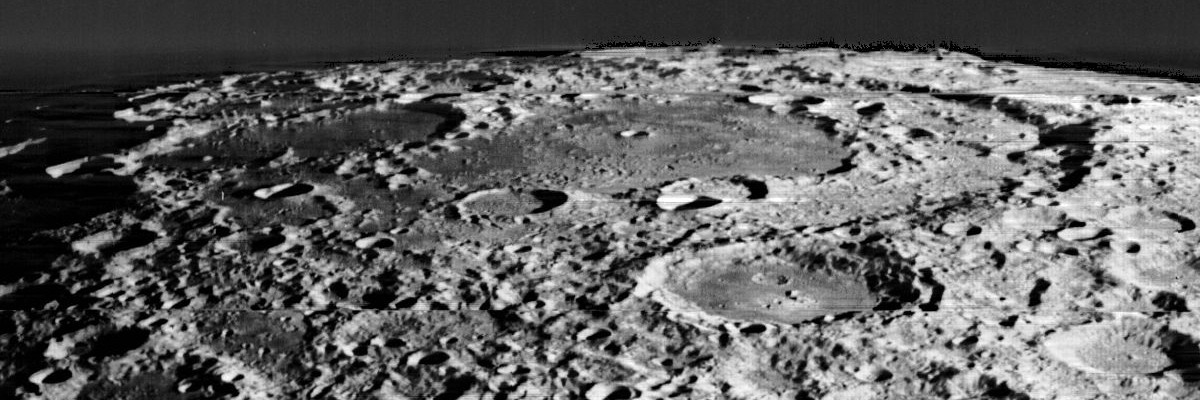
Oblique Lunar Orbiter 2 view, facing south

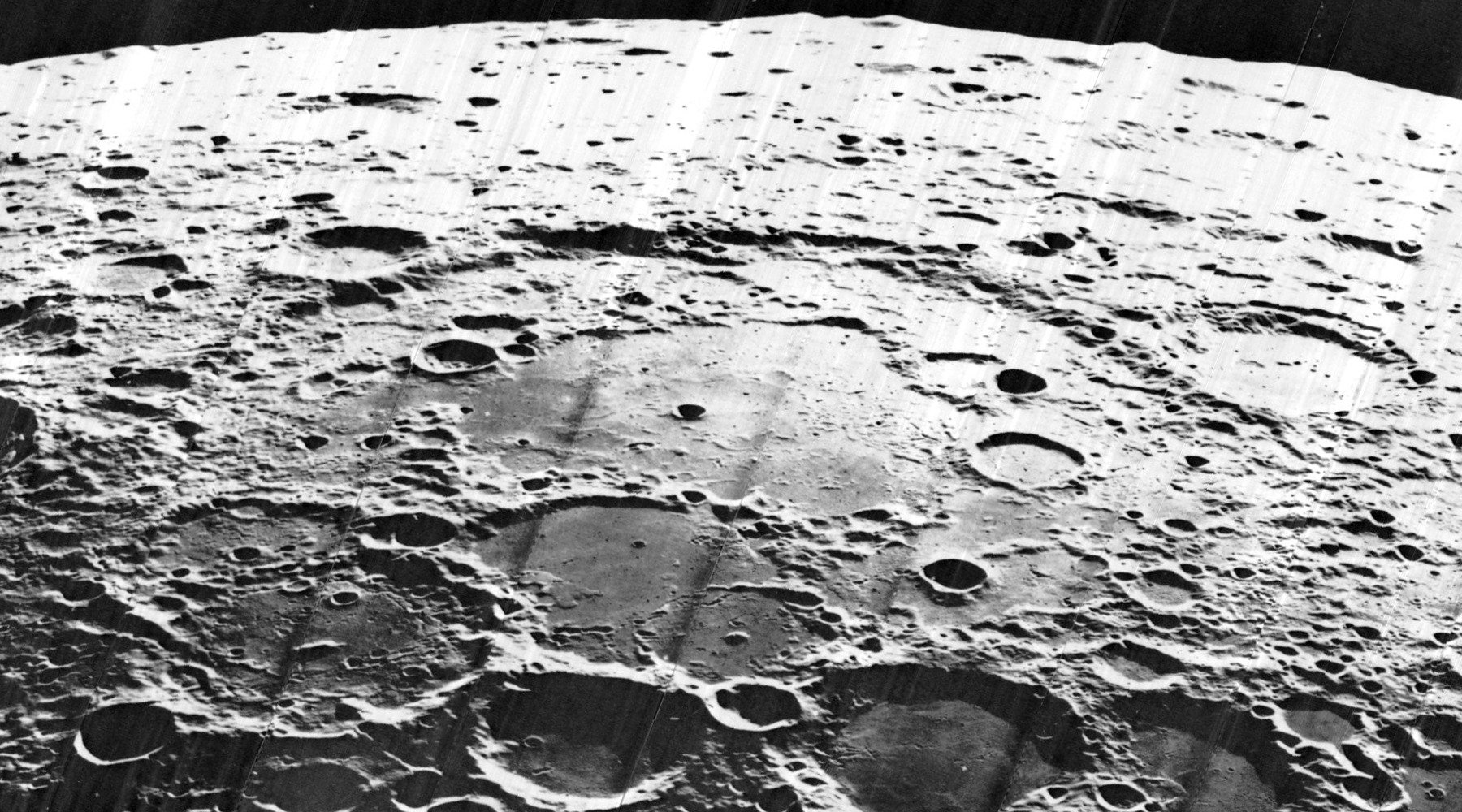
Oblique Lunar Orbiter 5 view, facing west

Poincaré is a large lunar impact basin that lies in the southern hemisphere on the far side of the Moon. This class of formation is known as a peak ring basin, which has a single interior topographic ring or a discontinuous ring of peaks with no central peak. Most of the formation has been heavily eroded by subsequent impacts, leaving a battered formation with only rugged remnants of the original outer rim to the west.

The eastern half has been completely worn away, and much of the interior has been resurfaced by lava flows. This surface has a lower albedo than the surrounding terrain, giving it a dark appearance. A rugged formation forms a low north–south range across the eastern section of the floor, possibly the remnant of an inner ring.

The perimeter of Poincaré has several notable craters. To the north is the crater Hopmann, while the craters Abbe and Hess lie to the east. Directly to the west is Planck, a walled plain of similar dimensions to Poincaré. Both formations are sufficiently large to have formed a small lunar mare on the near side face of the Moon.

The basin's name was adopted in 1970 by the IAU.

== Satellite craters ==
By convention these features are identified on lunar maps by placing the letter on the side of the crater midpoint that is closest to Poincaré.

Poincaré	Latitude	Longitude	Diameter
C	54.4° S	169.0° E	20 km
E	56.6° S	171.1° E	60 km
F	57.9° S	168.6° E	95 km
J	59.4° S	168.7° E	20 km
Q	59.3° S	160.9° E	26 km
R	60.2° S	155.0° E	52 km
X	53.8° S	161.9° E	19 km
Z	53.7° S	164.9° E	35 km
