= Cori (lunar crater) =

Crater on the Moon

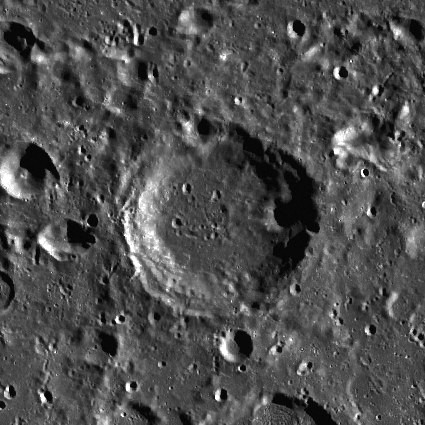
- LRO image
- Coordinates: 50.48°S 151.91°E
- Diameter: 67.22 km (41.77 mi)
- Depth: Unknown
- Colongitude: 154° at sunrise
- Formation: Nectarian
- Eponym: Gerty T. Cori

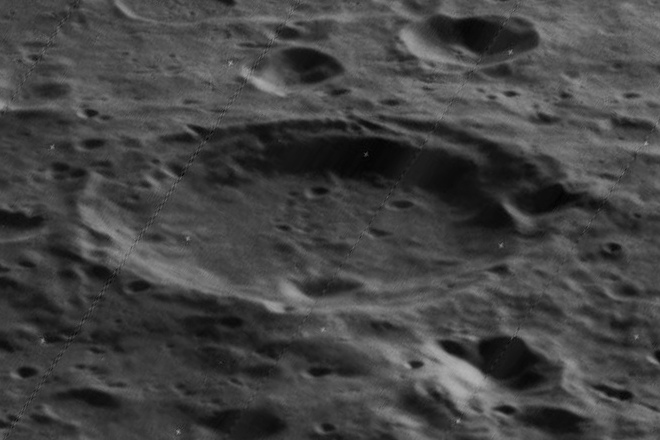
Oblique Lunar Orbiter 5 image.

Cori is a lunar impact crater that is located in the southern hemisphere on the far side of the Moon. It lies less than one crater diameter to the north of the crater Baldet. To the northeast is the crater Grissom. Cori is positioned in the central region of the South Pole-Aitken basin.

On the lunar geologic timescale, Cori dates to the Nectarian period. It a circular crater formation with a somewhat eroded outer rim. The inner wall has a shelf running around the western perimeter where the material has slumped somewhat from the edge. There is a small outward break in the northern wall, and a small crater lies against the eastern inner wall. The interior floor is marked by a few tiny craterlets, but no ridges or irregularities of note.

To the west of Cori are two unnamed craters with fractured floors.

This formation is named after Czech-American physiologist Gerty Cori (1896-1957). She was the first American woman to win the Nobel Prize, and the first woman to win the prize in the category Nobel Prize in Physiology or Medicine. Its designation was officially adopted by the International Astronomical Union in 1979.

== Satellite craters ==
By convention these features are identified on lunar maps by placing the letter on the side of the crater midpoint that is closest to Cori.

Cori	Latitude	Longitude	Diameter
G	50.9° S	147.0° W	20 km
