= Hess (crater) =

Crater on the Moon

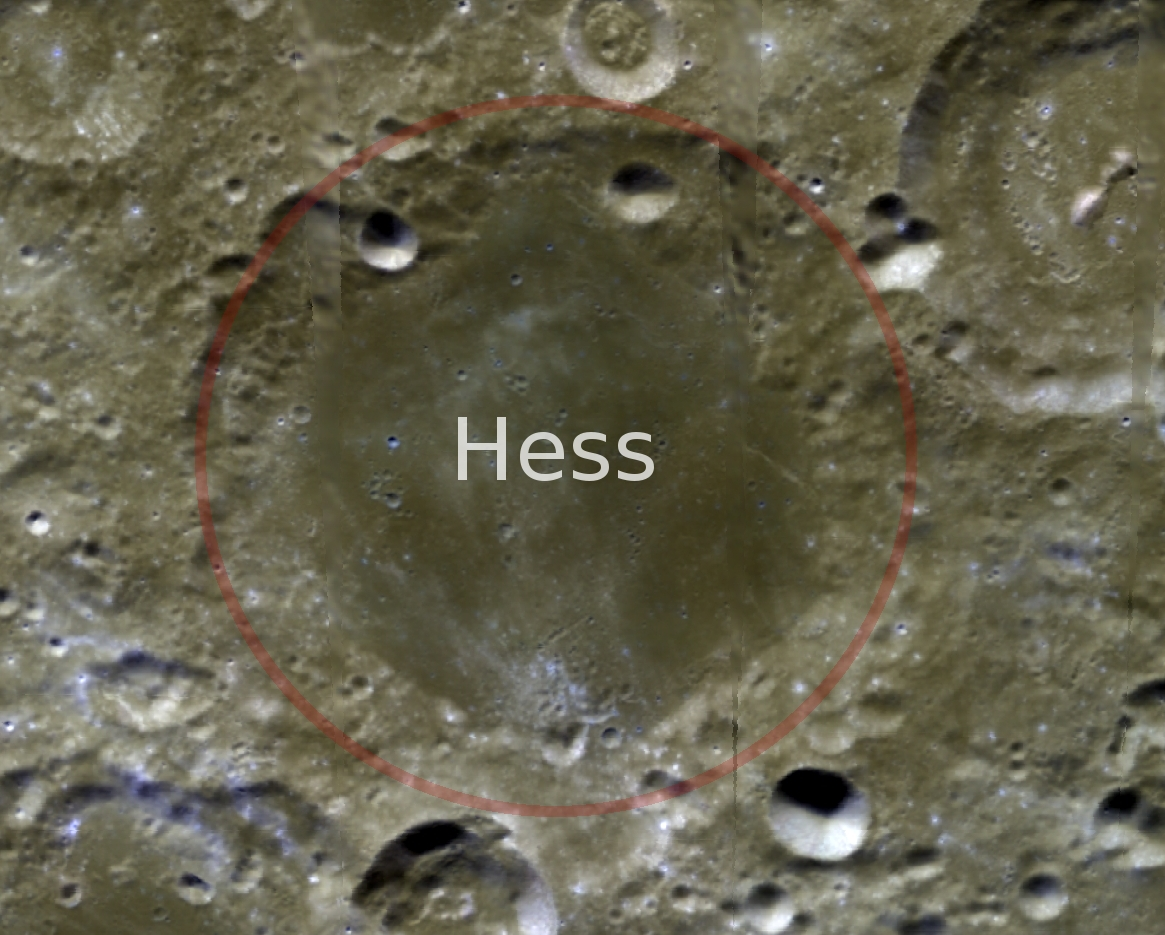
- Hess crater
- Coordinates: 54.3°S 174.6°E
- Diameter: 88 km
- Depth: Unknown
- Colongitude: 188° at sunrise
- Eponym: Victor F. Hess; Harry H. Hess

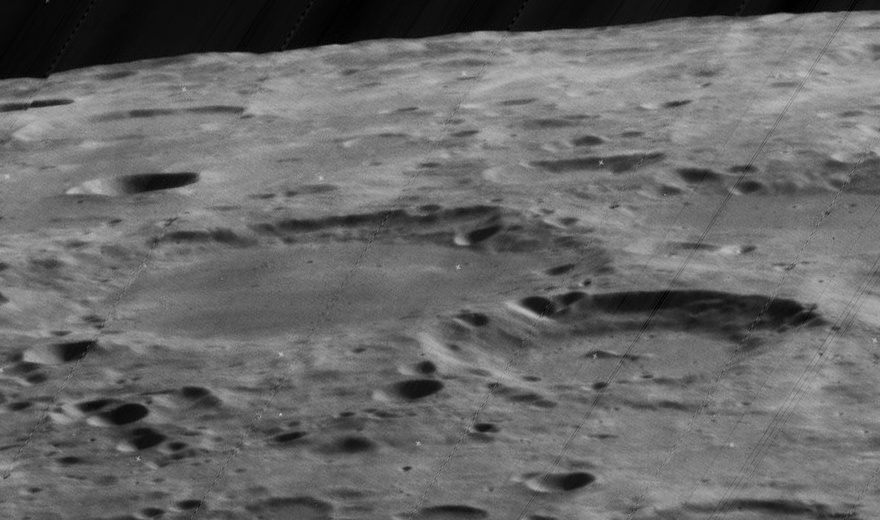
Oblique view of Hess (left of center) and Boyle (right of center), facing west. Lunar Orbiter 5 image.

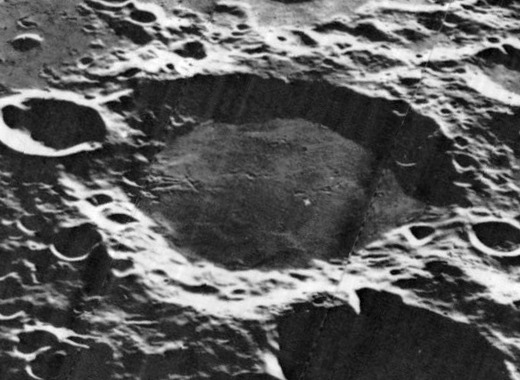
Another Lunar Orbiter 5 view of Hess, facing west.

Hess is a degraded lunar impact crater that lies in the southern hemisphere on the far side of the Moon. On the lunar geologic timescale, Hess dates from the Pre-Nectarian period. The crater rim has been worn by subsequent impacts, leaving a low, eroded outer wall. The flat interior has been resurfaced by lava flows and is free of significant impacts. This floor has a slightly darker albedo than the surrounding terrain.

The crater Boyle is nearly attached to the northeastern rim of Hess, and Abbe lies to the south. To the west is a large walled plain named Poincaré, and Hess is located at the eastern edge of the crater's deeply eroded outer rim. The satellite crater Hess Z is partly overlaid by the northern rim of Hess. The small crater Hess M joins the south-southwest rim of Hess to the northwest rim of Abbe.

== Satellite craters ==
By convention these features are identified on lunar maps by placing the letter on the side of the crater midpoint that is closest to Hess.

Hess	Latitude	Longitude	Diameter
M	55.9° S	173.7° E	27 km
W	52.6° S	171.4° E	28 km
Z	52.0° S	174.0° E	73 km
