= Bhabha (crater) =

Crater on the Moon

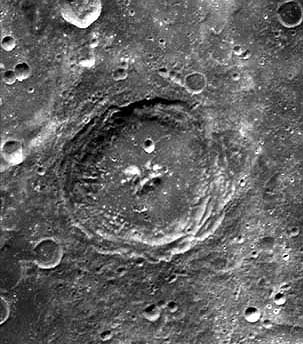
- Clementine mosaic
- Coordinates: 55.1°S 164.5°W
- Diameter: 70.25 km (43.65 mi)
- Depth: Unknown
- Colongitude: 167° at sunrise
- Formation: Early Imbrian
- Eponym: Homi J. Bhabha

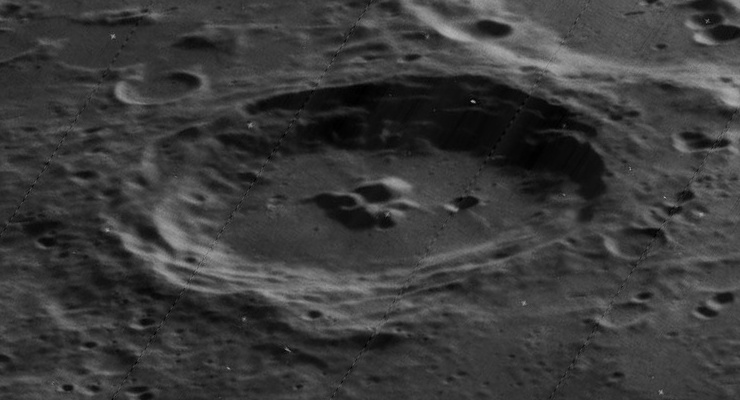
Oblique Lunar Orbiter 5 image

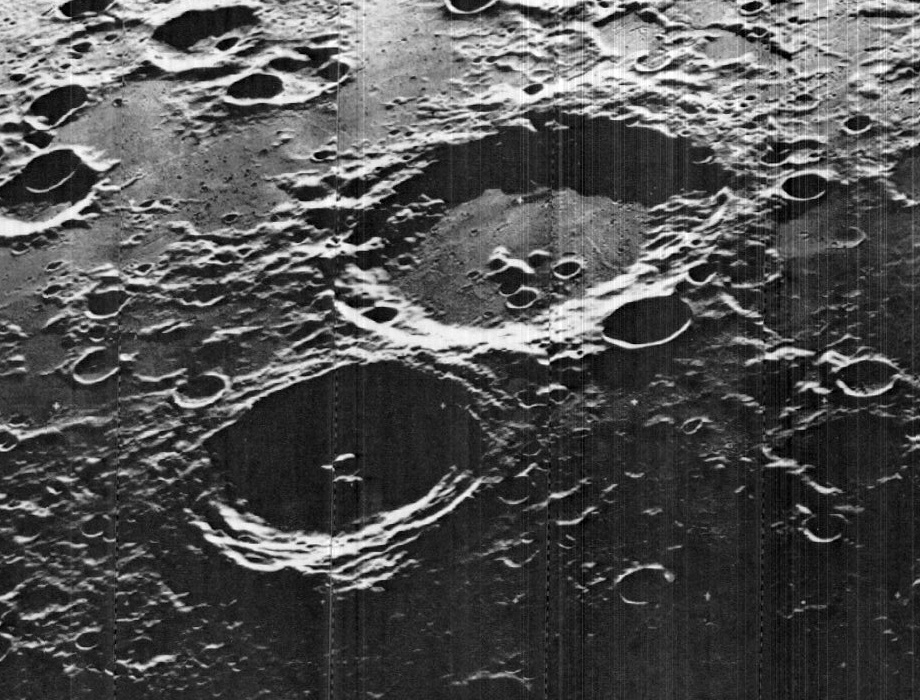
Oblique Lunar Orbiter 5 image of Bose (upper right) and Bhabha (lower left) craters

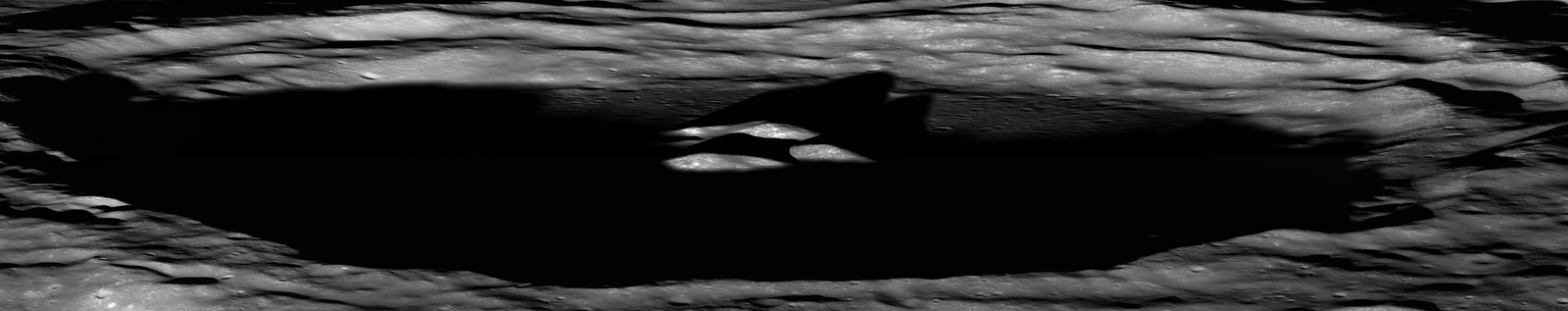
Highly oblique view from LRO

Bhabha is a lunar impact crater that is located in the southern part of the Moon's far side. It is nearly attached to the southeast rim of the larger crater Bose, and the outer rampart of that crater has produced a slight inward bulge along the northwest face of Bhabha. The Bose–Bhabha pair lie in the center region of the South Pole-Aitken basin floor. Other nearby craters of note include Stoney to the east, and Bellinsgauzen to the south.

The rim of Bhabha dates to the Early Imbrian epoch of the lunar geologic timescale. This is a relatively fresh crater with a nicely terraced inner wall. This terracing is most notable along the southeastern half of the crater, and nearly disappears along the north-northwest rim where the inner wall is at its minimum extent. The rim and inner wall have not been significantly eroded, and there are no craterlets of note along the rim.

The interior floor has a formation of central peaks that forms a semicircle with the concave interior open to the north. These rise to an altitude of around 1 km and span a width of 15 km. The spectra of the orthopyroxene-rich central peak fits a olivine-bearing norite mineralogy, which originated from a depth of 6.4 to 9.9 km. The remainder of the floor is relatively level, with a single small craterlet in the northern part.

Bhabha was named in honor of the physicist Homi Jehangir Bhabha (1909–1966), a nuclear physics pioneer in his home country of India. Its designation was formally adopted by the International Astronomical Union in 1970.
