= Alder (crater) =

Crater on the Moon

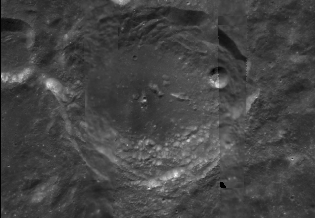
- Clementine mosaic
- Coordinates: 48.6°S 177.4°W
- Diameter: 82.12 km
- Depth: Unknown
- Colongitude: 180° at sunrise
- Formation: Late Imbrian
- Eponym: Kurt Alder

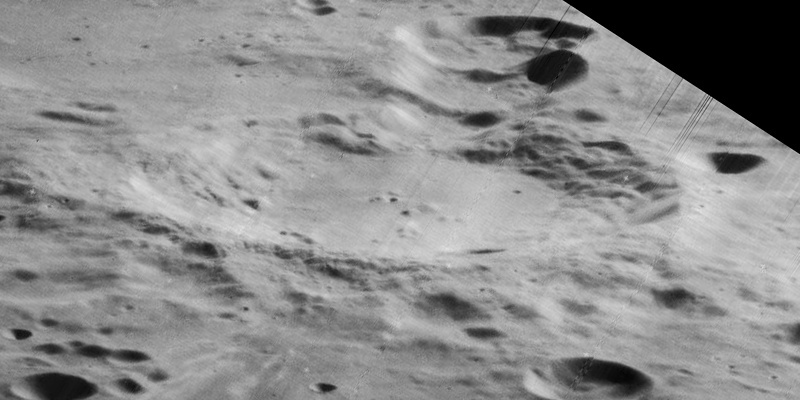
Oblique Lunar Orbiter 5 image

Alder is a lunar impact crater that is located in the southern hemisphere on the far side of the Moon. It is located in the South Pole-Aitken basin, and lies to the southeast of the crater Von Kármán. Southeast of Alder is Bose, and to the south-southwest lies Boyle.

This crater dates from the Late Imbrian epoch, with an age of around ~3.5+0.01
−0.2 Ga. The inner wall of Alder is rough and slightly terraced, with the material scattered across the edges of the otherwise relatively flat interior floor. There are several low central ridges lying along a band from the midpoint toward the eastern rim. A small crater lies on the eastern inner slopes. The crater is otherwise free of significant impacts within the rim.

The two small central mounds in Alder are similar in form but have distinctly different spectra. The mound to the west is strongly mafic, while the eastern mound shows more plagioclase. Alder is associated with the only area in the basin not dominated by the pyroxene rocks that are typical of lunar lowlands. On spectrographic evidence, this alder ejecta area is principally anorthosite rock, typical of the lunar highlands. Ejecta from this impact forms a major layer at the Chang'e 4 landing zone, located within the Von Kármán crater.

This crater is named after German chemist Kurt Alder (1902–1958), a 1950 Nobel laureate. Its designation was formally adopted by the International Astronomical Union in 1979.

== Satellite craters ==
By convention these features are identified on lunar maps by placing the letter on the side of the crater midpoint that is closest to Alder.

Alder	Latitude	Longitude	Diameter
E	47.6° S	172.3° W	16 km
