= Bellinsgauzen (crater) =

Lunar impact crater

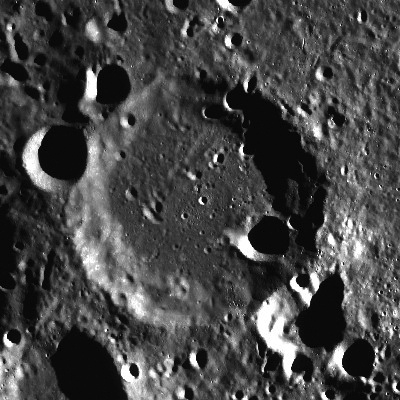
- LRO image
- Coordinates: 60.6°S 164.6°W
- Diameter: 63.23 km (39.29 mi)
- Depth: Unknown
- Colongitude: 167° at sunrise
- Formation: Nectarian
- Eponym: F. G. von Bellingshausen

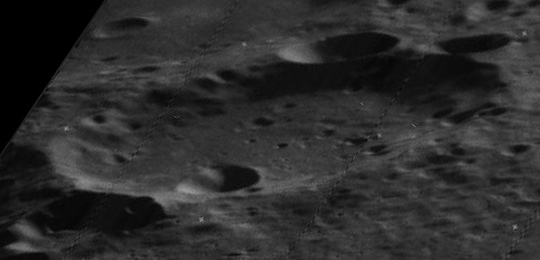
Oblique Lunar Orbiter 5 image

Bellinsgauzen (or Bellingshausen) is a lunar impact crater that lies in the southern part of Moon, on the far side from the Earth. It is attached to the northern rim of the larger crater Berlage, and within a half crater diameter of Cabannes to the west. North of Bellinsgauzen is the crater Bhabha.

On the lunar geologic timescale, Bellinsgauzenis dated to the Nectarian period. The outer rim of Bellinsgauzen is worn but the general shape is still intact. There are small craters lying along the inside and attached to the exterior of the rim to the southeast. A pair of small craters are also attached to the outside of the west and northwest rim. The inner surface is marked by a number of tiny craterlets, particularly near the northern end. The interior floor is otherwise relatively featureless.

This crater is named after Russian explorer F. G. von Bellingshausen (1778–1852). Its designation was formally adopted by the International Astronomical Union in 1970.
