= Stoney (lunar crater) =

Crater on the Moon

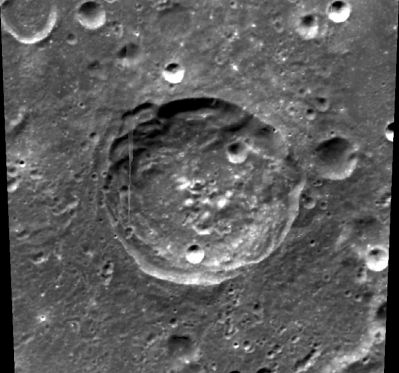
- Clementine mosaic
- Coordinates: 55.3°S 156.1°W
- Diameter: 47.51 km
- Depth: Unknown
- Colongitude: 158° at sunrise
- Formation: Nectarian
- Eponym: George J. Stoney

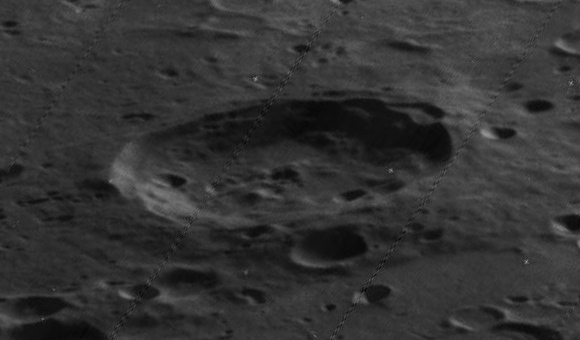
Oblique Lunar Orbiter 5 image

Stoney is an impact crater on the Moon, located in the southern part of its far side, approximately 47.5 kilometers in diameter. In 1970, it was named by IAU's Working Group for Planetary System Nomenclature after Anglo-Irish physicist George Johnstone Stoney (1826–1911). It lies to the southeast of the crater Baldet and to the east of Bhabha.

On the lunar geologic timescale, Stoney dates to the Nectarian period. The rim of this crater is sharp-edged but with a somewhat irregular lip that has slumped in places. There are small outward bulges in the rim to the east and northwest. The inner wall is uneven with diagonal grooves and heaps where the material has slumped.

This is a floor-fractured crater with a V-shaped moat between the inner wall and the floor. The interior floor is somewhat uneven, especially in the eastern half. There are two small craterlets within the interior, located at the base of the northeast and southern inner walls. The spectra of the central peak fits a olivine-bearing noritic gabbro mineralogy, which originated from a depth of 11.0 to 17.8 km.
