= Berlage (crater) =

Lunar impact crater

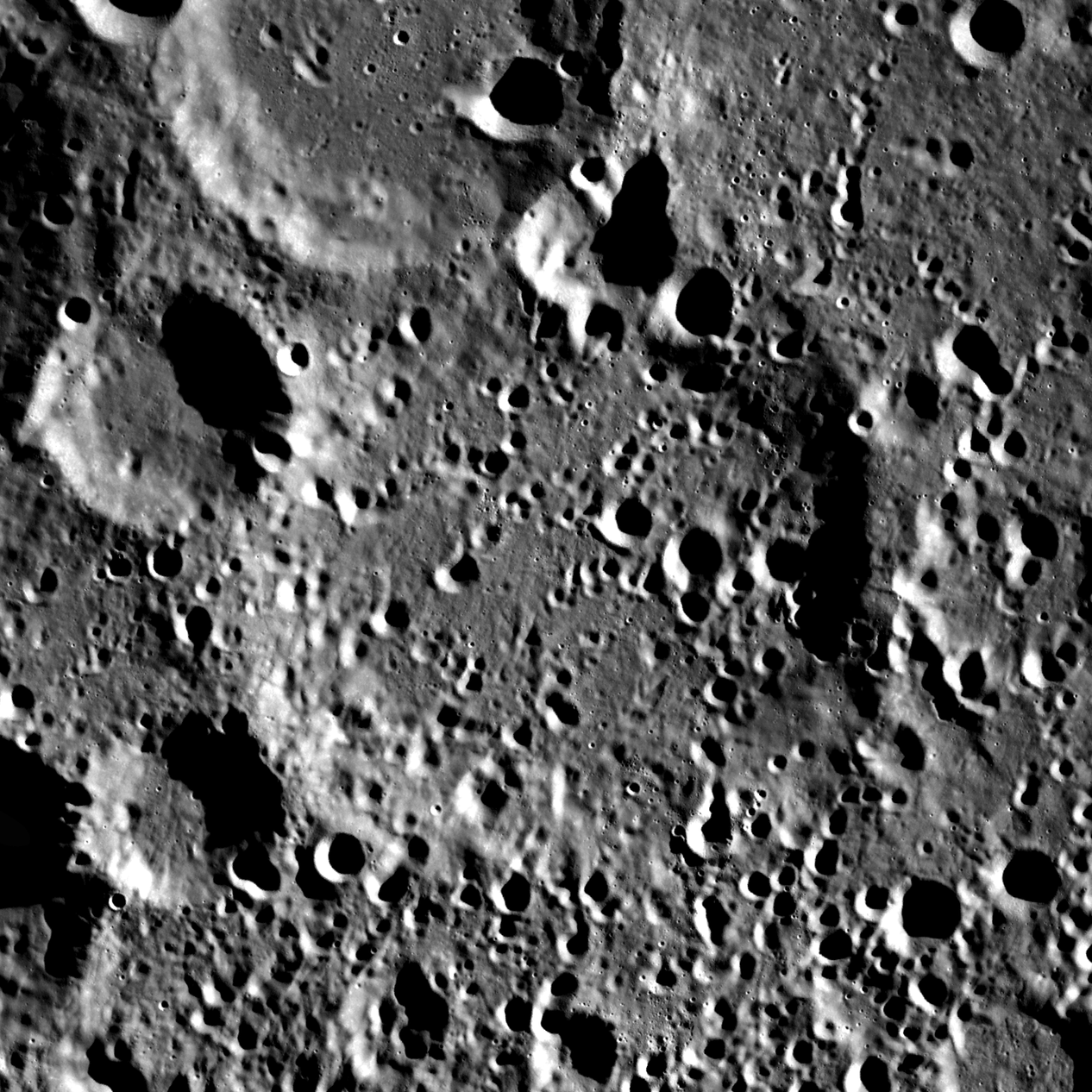
- LRO image
- Coordinates: 63.04°S 163.61°W
- Diameter: 93.75 km (58.25 mi)
- Depth: Unknown
- Colongitude: 166° at sunrise
- Formation: Pre-Nectarian
- Eponym: Hendrik P. Berlage

Berlage is an old lunar impact crater that lies in the southern hemisphere on the far side of the Moon. The smaller crater Bellinsgauzen is attached to its northern rim, and Cabannes is less than one crater diameter to the northwest. To the east-northeast of Berlage is Lemaître.

On the lunar geologic timescale, Berlage dates to the Pre-Nectarian period. This formation is unusual for the high density of small impact craters that lie across the interior and along the rim, especially in the northern half. The crater is heavily eroded, and the original features have been worn down with the passage of time. A combination of three small craters lie across the northern rim, at the eastern edge of the rim where Berlage is joined to Bellinsgauzen.

This crater is named after Dutch geophysicist and meteorologist Hendrik P. Berlage (1896–1968), who was an expert on the Southern Oscillation climate phenomenon. Its designation was formally adopted by the International Astronomical Union in 1970.

== Satellite craters ==
By convention these features are identified on lunar maps by placing the letter on the side of the crater midpoint that is closest to Berlage.

Berlage	Coordinates	Diameter
R	64.09°S 167.52°W	27 km
