= Gerty Cori =

Czech-American biochemist (1896–1957)

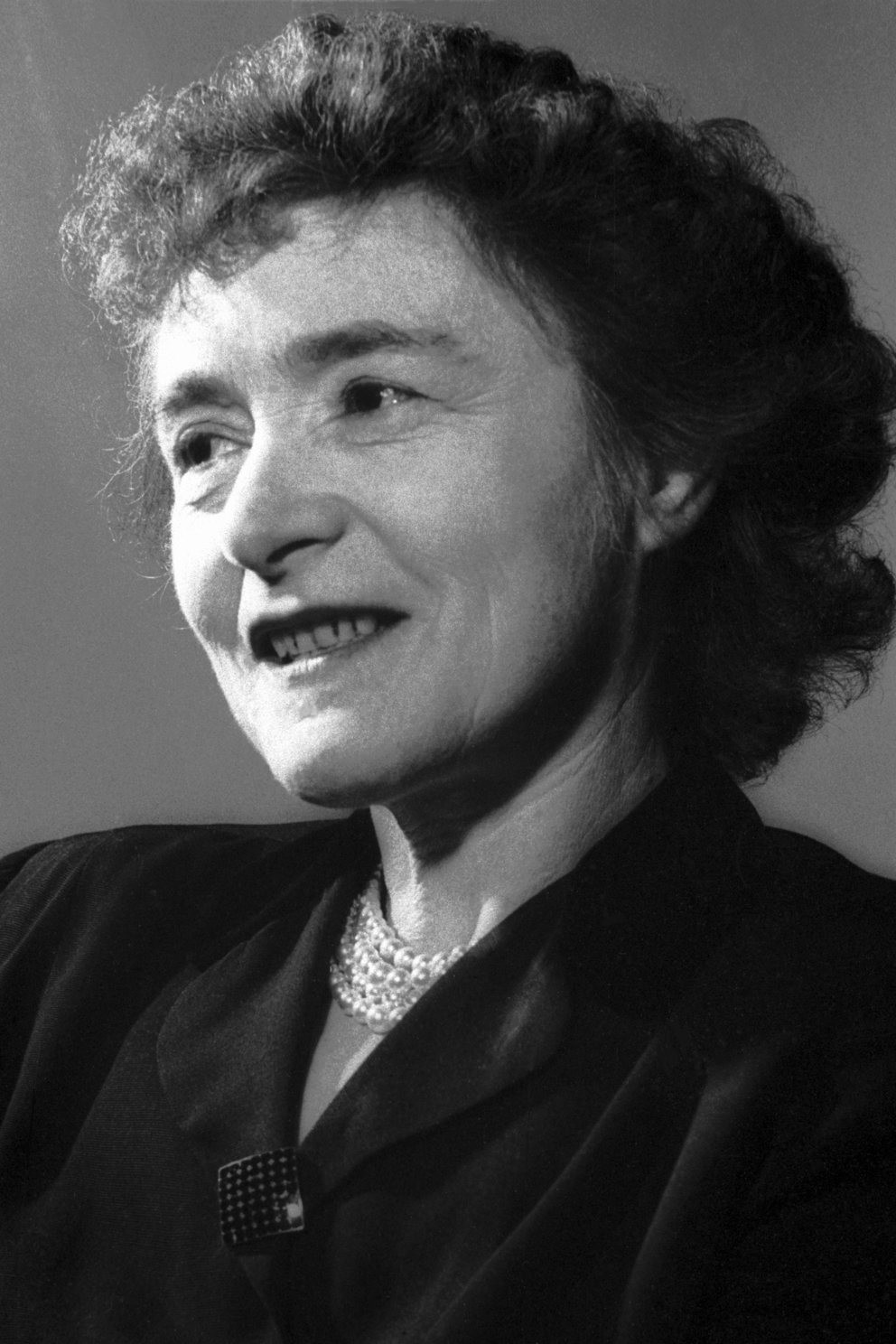
- Cori in 1947
- Born: Gertrude Theresa Radnitz; August 15, 1896; Prague, Kingdom of Bohemia, Austria-Hungary
- Died: October 26, 1957 (aged 61); Glendale, Missouri, US
- Citizenship: Austria-Hungary; Czechoslovakia; United States (naturalized)
- Education: Charles University
- Known for: Carbohydrate metabolism; The Cori cycle; Identification of Glucose 1-phosphate
- Spouse: Carl Ferdinand Cori (m. 1920)
- Children: 1
- Awards: Nobel Prize in Physiology or Medicine (1947); Garvan–Olin Medal (1948)
- Scientific career
- Fields: Biochemistry
- Workplaces: Washington University School of Medicine

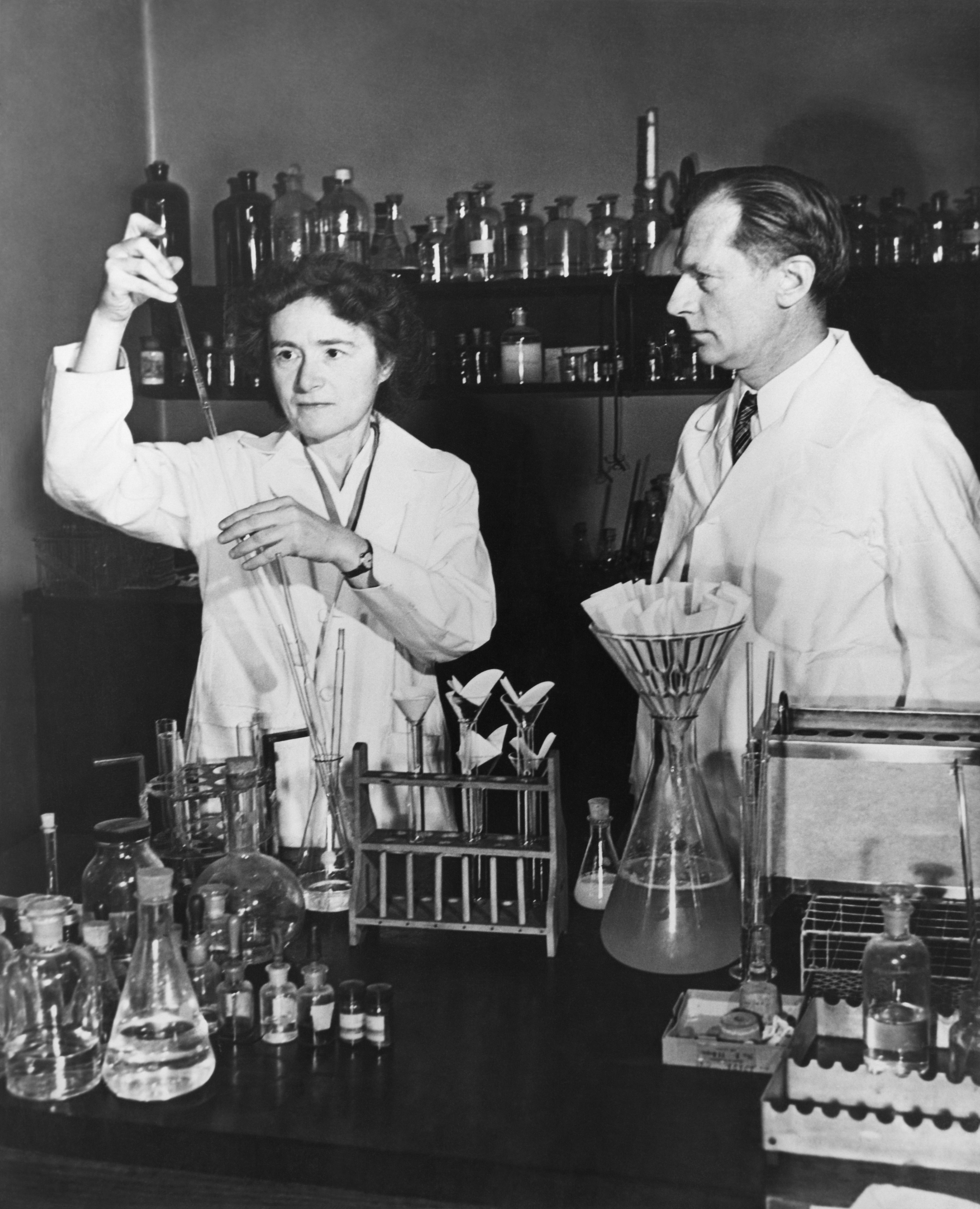
Gerty Cori with her husband and fellow-Nobelist, Carl Ferdinand Cori, in 1947.

Gerty Theresa Cori (née Radnitz; August 15, 1896 – October 26, 1957) was a Czech and American biochemist who in 1947 was the third woman to win a Nobel Prize in science, and the first woman to be awarded the Nobel Prize in Physiology or Medicine, for her role in the "discovery of the course of the catalytic conversion of glycogen".

Cori was born in Prague, the capital of Bohemia within the Austro-Hungarian Empire. Growing up at a time when women were marginalized and allowed few educational opportunities, she gained admittance to medical school, where she met her future husband Carl Ferdinand Cori in an anatomy class. Upon their graduation in 1920, they married. Because of deteriorating conditions in Europe, the couple emigrated to the United States in 1922. Gerty Cori continued her early interest in medical research, collaborating in the laboratory with Carl. She published research coauthored with her husband, as well as publishing singly. Unlike her husband, she had difficulty securing research positions, and the ones she obtained provided meager pay. Her husband insisted on continuing their collaboration, though he was discouraged from doing so by the institutions that employed him.

Together with her husband Carl and Argentine physiologist Bernardo Houssay, Gerty Cori received the Nobel Prize in 1947 for the discovery of the mechanism by which glycogen—a polysaccharide made from glucose—is broken down in muscle tissue into lactic acid and then resynthesized in the body and stored as a source of energy (known as the Cori cycle). They also identified the important catalyzing compound, the Cori ester. The Coris were the third ever married couple to win the Nobel Prize. In 2004, both Gerty and Carl Cori were designated a National Historic Chemical Landmark in recognition of their work in clarifying carbohydrate metabolism.

In 1957, Gerty Cori died after a ten-year struggle with myelosclerosis. She remained active in the research laboratory until the end of her life. She received recognition for her achievements through multiple awards and honors.

== Early life and education ==
Gerty Cori was born Gerty Theresa Radnitz into a Jewish family in Prague, Bohemia, Austria-Hungary (modern Czech Republic) in 1896. Her father, Otto Radnitz, was a chemist who became manager of sugar refineries after inventing a successful method for refining sugar. Her mother, Martha, a friend of Franz Kafka, was a culturally sophisticated woman. Gerty was tutored at home before enrolling in a lyceum for girls, and at the age of 16, she decided she wanted to be a medical doctor. Pursuing the study of science, Gerty learned that she lacked the prerequisites in Latin, physics, chemistry, and mathematics. Over the course of a year, she managed to study the equivalent of eight years of Latin, five years of science, and five years of mathematics.

Her uncle, a professor of pediatrics, encouraged her to attend medical school, so she studied for and passed the university entrance examination. She was admitted to the medical school of the Karl-Ferdinands-Universität in Prague in 1914, an unusual achievement for women at that time.

== Marriage and early career ==
While studying, she met Carl Cori, who was immediately attracted to her charm, vitality, sense of humor, and her love of the outdoors and mountain climbing. Gerty and Carl had both entered medical school at 18 and both graduated in 1920. They married that same year. Gerty converted to Catholic Christianity, enabling her and Carl to marry in the Catholic Church. They moved to Vienna, capital of Austria, where Gerty spent the next two years at the Carolinen Children's Hospital, and her husband worked in a laboratory. While at the hospital, Gerty Cori worked on the pediatrics unit and conducted experiments in temperature regulation, comparing temperatures before and after thyroid treatment, and published papers on blood disorders.

Carl was drafted into the Austrian army and served during World War I. Life was difficult after the war, and Gerty developed dry eye caused by severe malnutrition due to food shortages. These problems, in conjunction with the increasing anti-Semitism, contributed to the Coris' decision to leave Europe.

== Immigration to the United States ==
In 1922, the Coris both immigrated to the United States (Gerty six months after Carl because of difficulty in obtaining a position) to pursue medical research at New York State Institute for the Study of Malignant Disease (1912-1945), later the Roswell Park Cancer Institute, Buffalo, New York. In 1928, they became naturalized citizens. The director of the institute threatened to dismiss Gerty if she did not cease collaborative research with her husband. She continued to work with Carl and was nevertheless kept on at the institute.

She was constantly in the laboratory, where we two worked alone. We washed our own laboratory glassware and she would occasionally complain bitterly to Carl about not having any dishwashing help. When she tired, she would retire to her small office adjoining the laboratory, where she would rest on a small cot. She smoked incessantly and dropped cigarette ashes constantly ...

— Joseph Larner

Although the Coris were discouraged from working together at Roswell, they continued, specializing in investigating carbohydrate metabolism. They were particularly interested in how glucose is metabolized in the human body and the hormones that regulate this process. They published fifty papers while at Roswell. The lead author of each paper was the one who had done the most research. Gerty Cori published eleven articles as the sole author. In 1929, they proposed the theoretical cycle that later won them the Nobel Prize, the Cori cycle. The cycle describes how the human body uses chemical reactions to break some carbohydrates such as glycogen in muscle tissue into lactic acid, while synthesizing others.

== Washington University ==
The Coris left Roswell in 1931 after publishing their work on carbohydrate metabolism. Several universities offered Carl a position but refused to hire Gerty. Gerty was informed during one university interview that it was considered "un-American" for a married couple to work together. Carl refused a position at the University at Buffalo because the school would not allow him to work with his wife.

In 1931, they moved to St. Louis, Missouri, when Washington University offered positions to both Carl and Gerty, although Gerty's rank and salary were much lower than her husband's. Despite her research experience, Gerty was only offered a position as a research associate at a salary one tenth of that received by her husband; she was warned that she might impede her husband's career. Washington University's Chancellor, Arthur Compton, made a special allowance for Gerty to hold a position there, ignoring the university's nepotism rules. Gerty waited thirteen years before she attained the same rank as her husband. In 1943, she was appointed associate professor of Research Biological Chemistry and Pharmacology. Months before she won the Nobel Prize, she was promoted to full professor, a post she held until her death in 1957.

While working at Washington University, they discovered an intermediate compound in frog muscles that enabled the breakdown of glycogen, called glucose 1-phosphate, later known as the Cori ester. They established the compound's structure, identified the enzyme phosphorylase that catalyzed its chemical formation, and deduced that the Cori ester is the beginning step in the conversion of the carbohydrate glycogen into glucose (breaking down energy stores into a form that can be used). It can also be the last step in the conversion of blood glucose to glycogen, as it is reversible. Gerty Cori also studied glycogen storage disease, identifying at least four forms, each related to a particular enzymatic defect. She was the first to show that a defect in an enzyme can cause a human genetic disease.

Gerty and Carl Cori collaborated on most of their work, including that which won the 1947 Nobel Prize in Physiology or Medicine "for their discovery of the course of the catalytic conversion of glycogen". They received one half the prize, the other half going to the Argentinian physiologist, Bernardo Houssay "for his discovery of the part played by the hormone of the anterior pituitary lobe in the metabolism of sugar". Their work helped clarify the mechanisms of carbohydrate metabolism, advancing understanding of the reversible conversion of sugars and starch, which proved crucial to the development of diabetic treatments.

== Awards and recognition ==
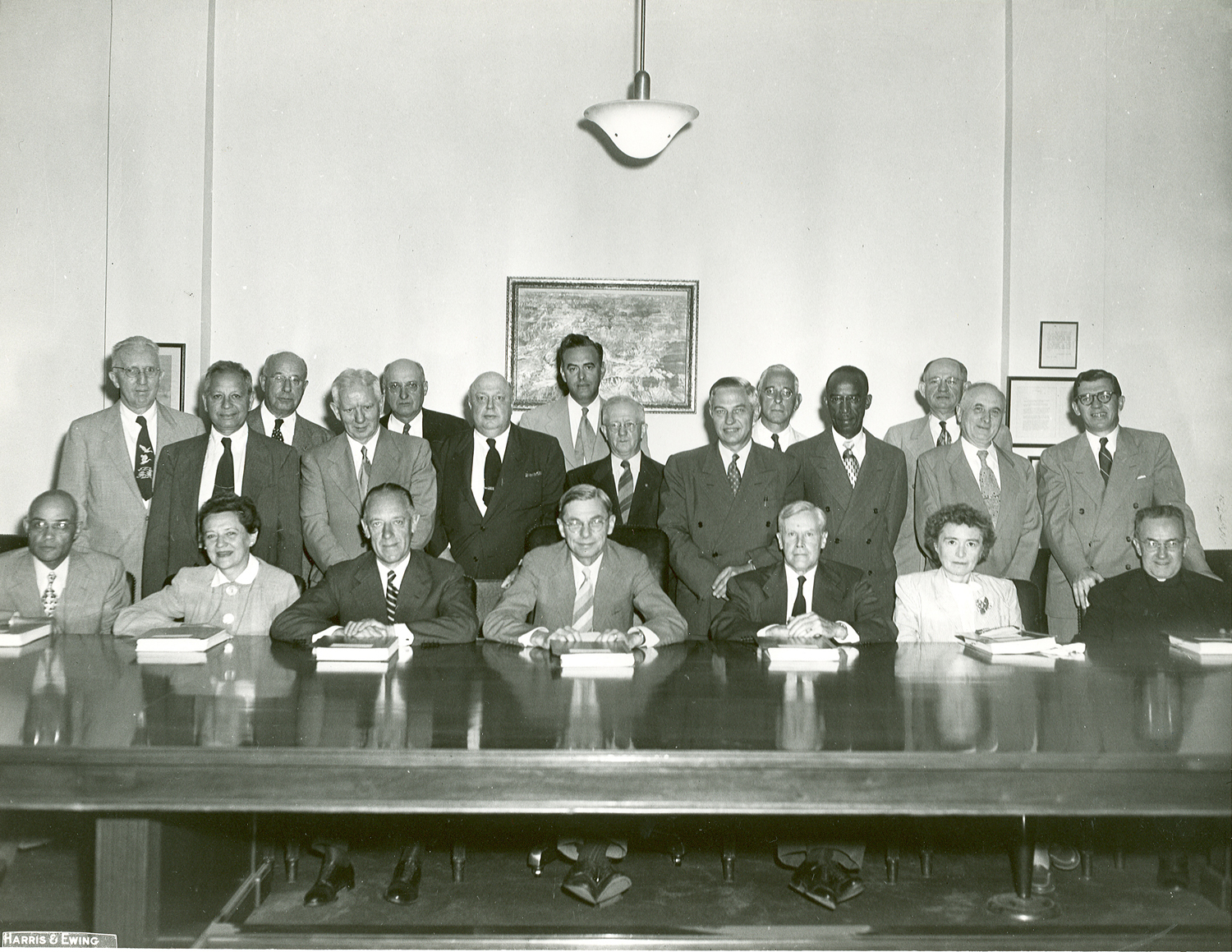
National Science Board Members, July 1951 (Cori is second from the right, first row)

In 1947, Gerty Cori became the third woman—and the first American woman—to win a Nobel Prize in science. Previously, Marie Curie had received two, and Irène Joliot-Curie won one. Cori was the first woman to be awarded the Nobel Prize in Physiology or Medicine. She was elected a Fellow of the American Academy of Arts and Sciences in 1953. Cori was the fourth woman elected to the National Academy of Sciences. She was appointed by President Harry S. Truman as board member of the National Science Foundation, a position she held until her death.

Gerty was a member of the American Society of Biological Chemists, the American Chemical Society and the American Philosophical Society. She and her husband were presented jointly with the Midwest Award (American Chemical Society) in 1946 and the Squibb Award in Endocrinology in 1947. In addition, Cori received the Garvan-Olin Medal (1948), the St. Louis Award (1948), the Sugar Research Prize (1950), the Borden Award (1951).

Despite rampant gender discrimination and nepotism rules, she never stopped pursuing her lifelong interest in medical research. Brilliant and quick-witted, Cori was a superb experimentalist as well as a perfectionist.

The twenty-five foot square laboratory shared by Cori and her husband at Washington University was deemed a National Historic Landmark by the American Chemical Society in 2004. Six scientists mentored by Cori and her husband went on to win Nobel Prizes, which is only surpassed by the number mentored by British physicist J.J. Thomson.

In 1949, she was awarded the Iota Sigma Pi National Honorary Member for her significant contribution. The crater Cori on the Moon is named after her, as is the Cori crater on Venus. She shares a star with her husband on the St. Louis Walk of Fame. She was inducted into the National Women's Hall of Fame in 1998.

Correct formula for glucose-1-phosphate shown incorrectly on the US postage stamp

Cori was honored by a US Postal Service stamp in April 2008. The 41-cent stamp was reported by the Associated Press to have a printing error in the chemical formula for glucose-1-phosphate (Cori ester), but was distributed despite the error. Her description reads: "Biochemist Gerty Cori (1896–1957), in collaboration with her husband, Carl, made important discoveries—including a new derivative of glucose—that elucidated the steps of carbohydrate metabolism and contributed to the understanding and treatment of diabetes and other metabolic diseases. In 1947, the couple was awarded a half share of the Nobel Prize in Physiology or Medicine."

The US Department of Energy named the NERSC-8 supercomputer installed at Berkeley Lab in 2015/2016 after Cori. In November 2016, NERSC's Cori ranked 5th on the TOP500 list of world's most powerful high-performance computers.

Gerty is the more celebrated of the Coris because she is considered a pioneer woman of science. In her lifetime, however, she experienced much prejudice as a woman.

== Final years ==
Just before winning the Nobel prize, while they were on a mountain climbing trip, the Coris learned that Gerty Cori was ill with myelosclerosis, a fatal disease of the bone marrow. During her years at the Institute for the Study of Malignant Disease, Gerty had worked with X-rays, studying their effects on the human body, which may have contributed to her illness. She struggled for ten years with the illness while continuing her scientific work; only in the final months did she let up. In 1957, she died in her home. Gerty was cremated and her ashes scattered. Later, her son erected a cenotaph for Gerty and Carl Cori in Bellefontaine Cemetery in St. Louis, Missouri.

She was survived by her husband and their only child, Tom Cori, who married the daughter of conservative activist Phyllis Schlafly. In 2016 Tom donated his parents' Nobel Prize medals to the Washington University School of Medicine where they are on display in the Becker Medical Library.

Carl Cori remarried in 1960 to Anne Fitzgerald-Jones. The two later moved to Boston, where Carl taught at Harvard Medical School. He continued to work there until his death in 1984, aged 87.

== See also ==
- List of female Nobel laureates
- List of Jewish Nobel laureates
- Timeline of women in science
