= Diels–Reese reaction =

Chemical reaction

The Diels–Reese Reaction is a reaction between hydrazobenzene and dimethyl acetylenedicarboxylate (or related esters) first reported in 1934 by Otto Diels and Johannes Reese. Later work by others extended the reaction scope to include substituted hydrazobenzenes. The exact mechanism is not known. By changing the acidic or basic nature of the solvent, the reaction gives different products. With acetic acid as solvent (acidic), the reaction gives an diphenylpyrazolone. With xylene as solvent (neutral), the reaction gives an indole. With pyridine as solvent (basic), the reaction gives a carbomethoxyquinoline which can be degraded to a dihydroquinoline.

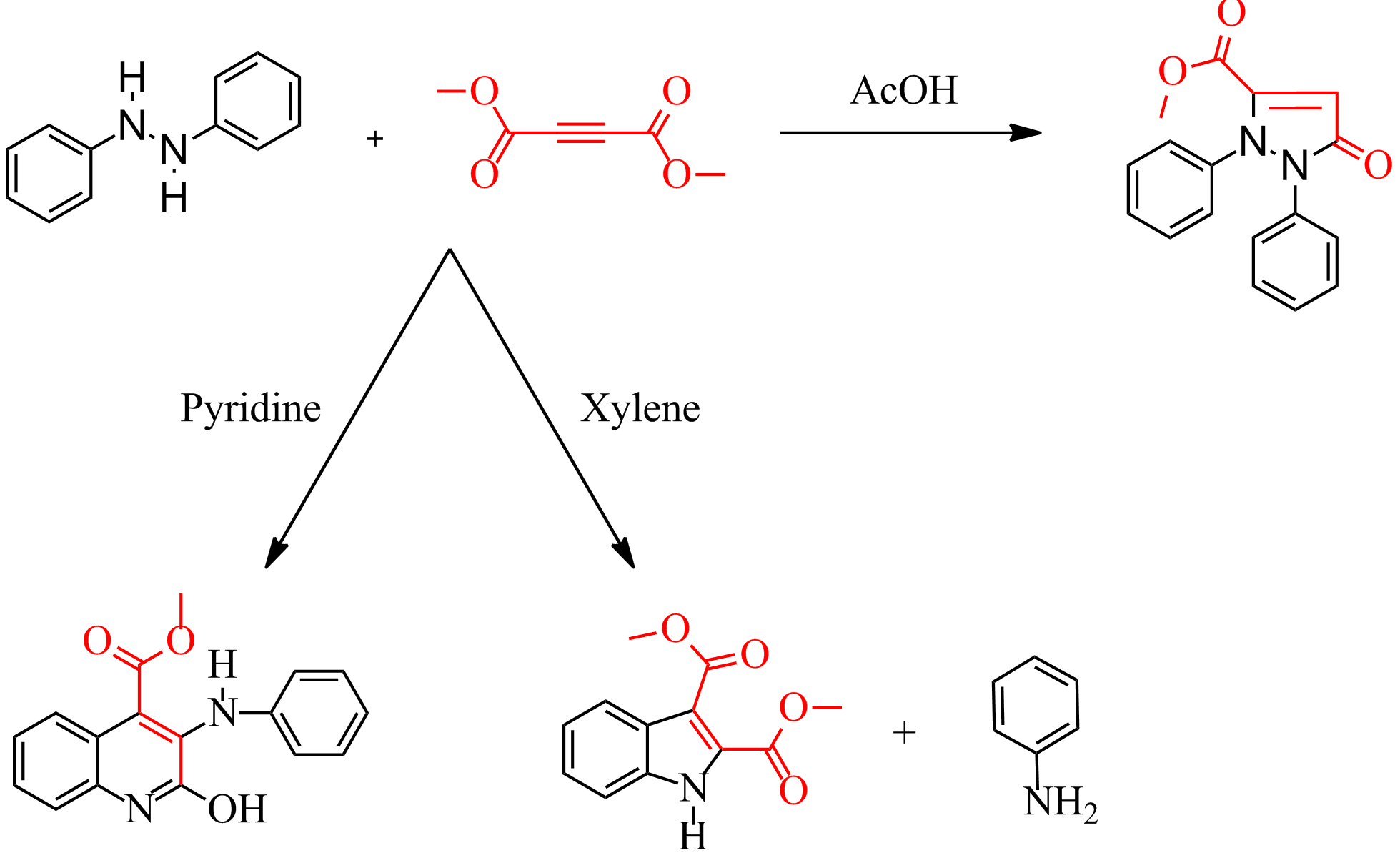
