= Ferdinand Münz =

Austrian chemist (1888–1969)

- Born: 23 June 1888; Kracow
- Died: 16 August 1969 (aged 81); Glashütten, Germany
- Education: Technische Universität Wien
- Known for: EDTA synthesis
- Scientific career
- Fields: Organic chemistry
- Workplaces: IG Farben

Ferdinand Münz (1888-1969) was an Austrian chemist who first synthesized EDTA (ethylenediaminetetraacetic acid) at IG Farben in 1935, patented both in Germany (anonymously) and in the USA (with his name), with the aim of producing a citric acid substitute, in order to reduce the German government's dependence on imports of chemical products from abroad. Münz noted that an aminocarboxylic acid worked much better as a chelating agent than citric acid and therefore thought that a polyaminopolycarboxylic acid would have worked even better.

In 1945 he worked closely with the future Nobel laureate Kurt Alder (1902-1958). In 1949 they published a paper together on diene synthesis and additions.

== See also ==
- EDTA
