= Baldet (lunar crater) =

Crater on the Moon

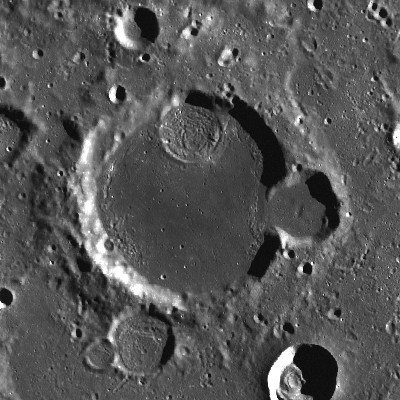
- LRO image
- Coordinates: 53.32°S 151.96°W
- Diameter: 55.76 km (34.65 mi)
- Depth: Unknown
- Colongitude: 153° at sunrise
- Formation: Nectarian
- Eponym: Fernand Baldet

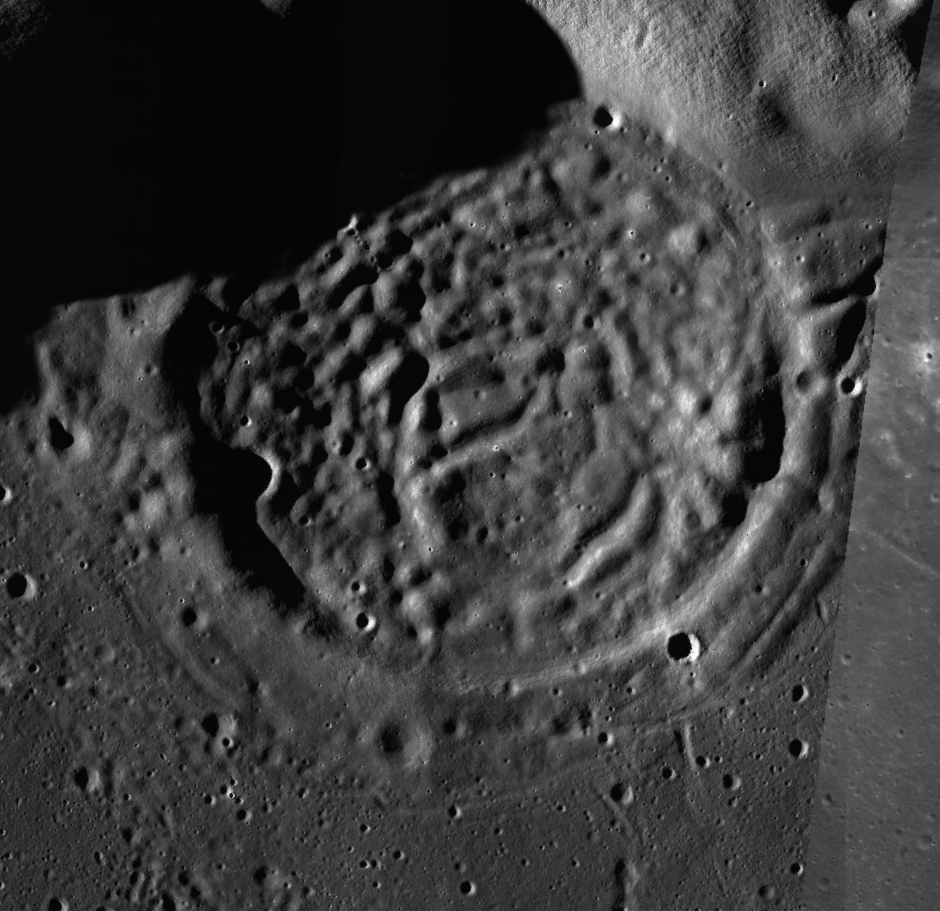
Unnamed crater with fractured floor, northern floor of Baldet

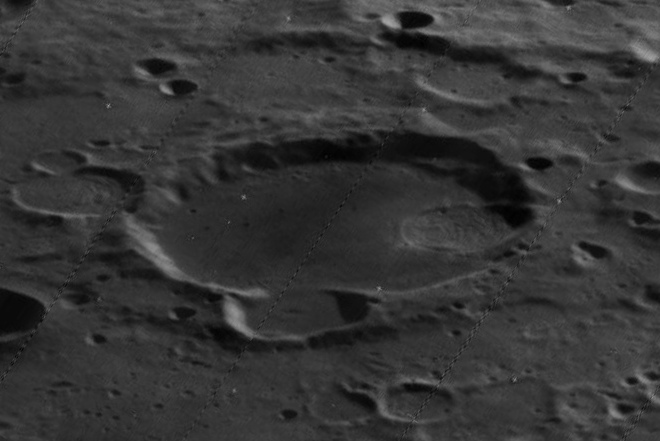
Oblique Lunar Orbiter 5 image

Baldet is a lunar impact crater that is located on the southern hemisphere on the far side of the Moon. It lies in the basalt-covered region between the craters Cori to the north, Stoney to the southwest, and the worn walled plain called Minkowski to the southeast. Baldet overlays a large impact basin with a 190 km diameter.

On the lunar geologic timescale, this crater is from the Nectarian period. The rim of Baldet is low and worn, but generally retains its original circular shape. The wall and rim show low‐Ca pyroxene bearing features. There is a slight outward bulge along the northwest rim, and the western interior wall is wider than elsewhere.

The flat, nearly featureless interior has been flooded by basaltic flow, and has a lower albedo than the surroundings giving is a darker hue. A smaller crater has broken into the eastern rim, leaving a gap where the two craters intersect that has been covered in basalt. A similar-sized crater with a fractured floor lies just inside the northern rim, producing a raised ring in the crater surface. A similar crater lies just outside the southern rim of Baldet.

This crater is named after French astronomer Fernand Baldet (1885-1964). Its designation was formally adopted by the International Astronomical Union in 1970. The name was introduced into lunar nomenclature by F. C. Lamèch.

== Satellite craters ==
By convention these features are identified on lunar maps by placing the letter on the side of the crater midpoint that is closest to Baldet.

Baldet	Latitude	Longitude	Diameter
J	54.6° S	149.5° W	17 km
