= Laura Hopmann =

German politician (born 1989)

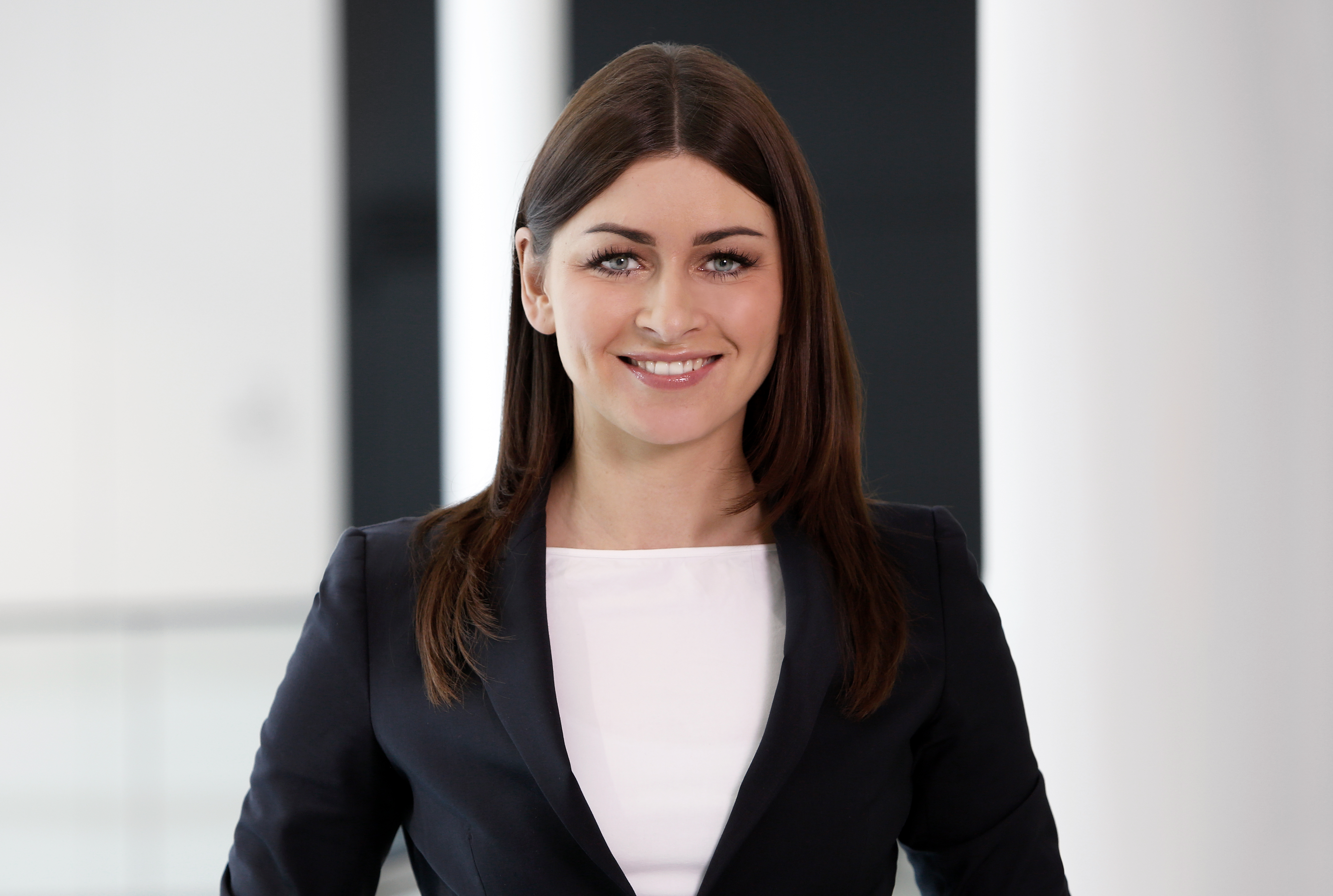
- Hopmann in 2018

Member of the Landtag of Lower Saxony
- Incumbent
- Assumed office 14 November 2017

Personal details
- Born: 30 December 1989 (age 36) Hildesheim
- Party: Christian Democratic Union (since 2012)

Laura Hopmann (née Rebuschat; born 30 December 1989 in Hildesheim) is a German politician serving as a member of the Landtag of Lower Saxony since 2017. She has served as chairwoman of the Christian Democratic Union in Hildesheim since 2021.

Laura Hopmann has been married to Björn Hopmann since 2019 and is the mother of a son since summer 2020. She is of the Evangelical Lutheran faith. She lives near Gronau (Leine) in the Despetal valley.
