= Bose (crater) =

Crater on the Moon

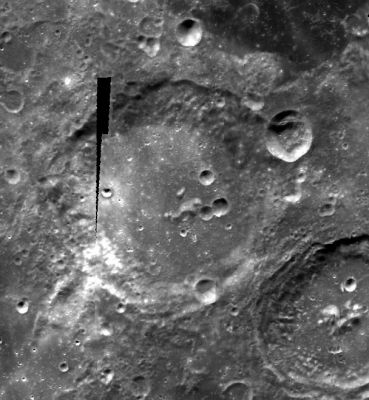
- Clementine mosaic
- Coordinates: 53.5°S 170.0°W
- Diameter: 92.55 km (57.51 mi)
- Depth: Unknown
- Colongitude: 172° at sunrise
- Formation: Early Imbrian
- Eponym: Sir Jagadish Chandra Bose

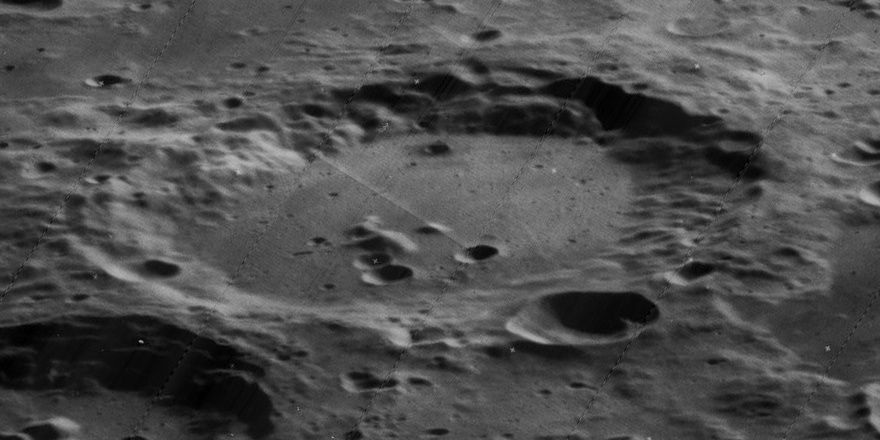
Oblique Lunar Orbiter 5 image

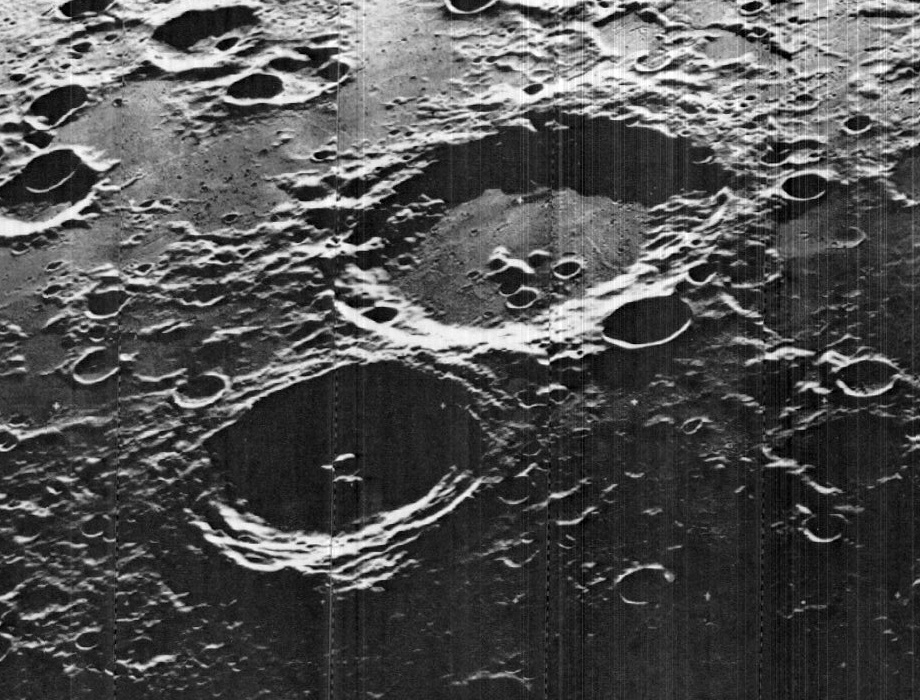
Oblique Lunar Orbiter 5 image of Bose (upper right) and Bhabha (lower left) craters

Bose is a lunar impact crater that is located on the far side of the Moon, in the southern hemisphere. It lies just to the northwest of the smaller crater Bhabha, and southeast of Alder. The Bose–Bhabha pair lie in the center region of the South Pole-Aitken basin floor.

The rim of Bose dates to the Early Imbrian epoch of the lunar geologic timescale. The outer rim has become worn and the edges rounded by impacts, although the shape of the wall is still well-preserved. The small satellite crater Bose D lies across the east-northeastern rim, and a smaller craterlet has impacted on the inner southeast wall.

The inner floor is level with a low central peak offset slightly to the southeast of the midpoint. The floor surface is likely basalt that is significantly covered by ejecta from nearby impacts. There are several tiny craterlets marking the interior, including three to the east of the central peak. The spectra of the central peak fits an olivine-bearing gabbroic norite mineralogy, which originated from a depth of 9.1 to 14.5 km.

The crater is named after Indian botanist and physicist Jagadish Chandra Bose (1858–1937), for his works on wireless communication. Its designation was officially adopted by the International Astronomical Union in 1970.

== Satellite craters ==
By convention these features are identified in selenography by placing the letter on the side of the crater midpoint that is closest to Bose.

Bose	Latitude	Longitude	Diameter
A	49.3° S	166.5° W	28 km
D	52.7° S	166.1° W	20 km
U	52.8° S	174.6° W	38 km

== See also ==
- Mitra (crater)
