= Fernand Baldet =

French astronomer

Fernand Baldet (16 March 1885 – 8 November 1964) was a French astronomer.

He worked with Count Aymar de la Baume Pluvinel observing Mars from the newly built observatory on Pic du Midi in 1909. The resulting photographs, taken with the 0.5 metre (20 inch) reflecting Baillaud telescope, were so sharp that they were able to disprove Percival Lowell's claim of geometrical canals on the planet's surface.

Baldet was the president of the Société astronomique de France (SAF), the French astronomical society, from 1939 to 1945. In 1946, Baldet and Charles Maurain jointly received the Prix Jules Janssen, the society's highest award.

The crater Baldet on the Moon and the crater Baldet on Mars were named in his honour.

Baldet was French pioneer of color photography working in Autochrome Lumière, Kodachrome and Agfacolor before the Second World War.
