= Hopmann (crater) =

Lunar impact crater

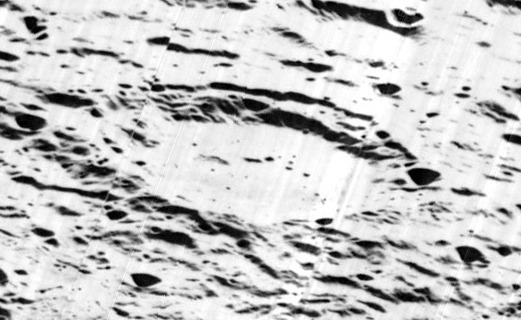
- Oblique Lunar Orbiter 5 image, facing west
- Coordinates: 50.8°S 160.3°E
- Diameter: 88 km
- Depth: Unknown
- Colongitude: 202° at sunrise
- Formation: Nectarian
- Eponym: Josef Hopmann

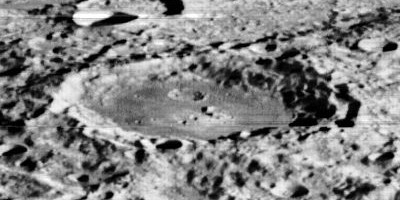
Oblique Lunar Orbiter 2 view, facing south

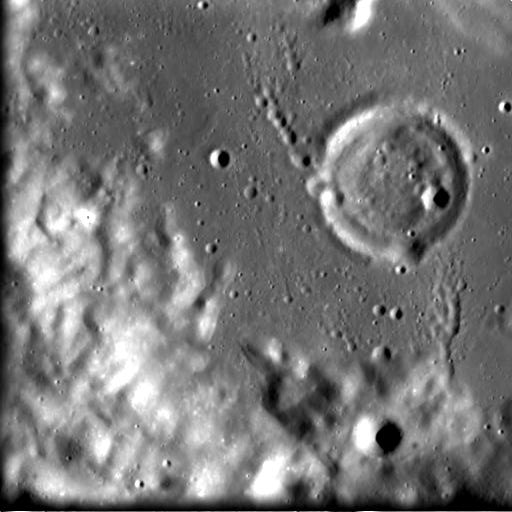
SMART-1 image of part of Hopmann

Hopmann is a lunar impact crater that lies in the southern hemisphere on the Moon's far side. It is attached to the northern part of a large walled plain named Poincaré. Less than one crater diameter to the north-northwest is the crater Garavito.

On the lunar geologic timescale, Cori dates to the Nectarian period. The outer rim of this crater is degraded due to impact erosion. Still the inner walls possess some terrace structures along the southern edge. A small crater overlays the northern rim, and a pair of tiny craters line along the eastern edge.

The interior floor is relatively level and has a lower albedo than the surrounding surface, giving it a slightly dark appearance. There are some low ridges near the crater midpoint, and a double-ringed rim to the south-southeast of the center. The spectra of the central peak fits a olivine-bearing noritic gabbro mineralogy, which originated from a depth of 8.8 to 14.0 km.

A tiny craterlet to the northwest of the midpoint is surrounded by a small skirt of higher albedo material, giving it the appearance of a white patch. Hopmann has a complex lunar swirl pattern that is associated with a weak magnetic anomaly.

== See also ==
- 1985 Hopmann, minor planet
