= 1985 Hopmann =

Dark main-belt asteroid

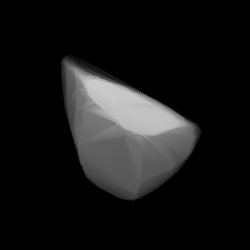
- Shape of Hopmann modeled from its lightcurve

Discovery
- Discovered by: K. Reinmuth
- Discovery site: Heidelberg Obs.
- Discovery date: 13 January 1929

Designations
- Named after: Josef Hopmann (German astronomer)
- Alternative designations: 1929 AE · 1951 CA_{2} 1951 CP · 1952 KE; 1964 PJ · 1973 AA_{4}
- Minor planet category: main-belt · (outer)

Orbital characteristics
- Epoch 4 September 2017 (JD 2458000.5)
- Uncertainty parameter 0
- Observation arc: 88.16 yr (32,201 days)
- Aphelion: 3.6021 AU
- Perihelion: 2.6408 AU
- Semi-major axis: 3.1214 AU
- Eccentricity: 0.1540
- Orbital period (sidereal): 5.51 yr (2,014 days)
- Mean anomaly: 334.27°
- Mean motion: 0° 10^{m} 43.32^{s} / day
- Inclination: 17.159°
- Longitude of ascending node: 305.15°
- Argument of perihelion: 234.25°

Physical characteristics
- Mean diameter: 35.47 km (derived); 35.51±3.1 km (IRAS:6); 44.33±3.53 km
- Synodic rotation period: 17.476±0.003 h 17.478±0.004 h 17.4787±0.0001 h 17.480±0.002 h
- Geometric albedo: 0.039±0.007 (IRAS:6); 0.0613 (derived)
- Spectral type: C
- Absolute magnitude (H): 10.75±0.19 · 10.9 · 10.91

1985 Hopmann (prov. designation: 1929 AE) is a dark background asteroid in the outer regions of the asteroid belt. It was discovered on 13 January 1929, by astronomer Karl Reinmuth at Landessternwarte Heidelberg-Königstuhl in southern Germany. The asteroid has a rotation period of 17.5 hours and measures approximately 36 kilometers (22 miles) in diameter. It was later named after German astronomer Josef Hopmann (1890–1975).

== Orbit and classification ==
Hopmann is a dark C-type asteroid that orbits the Sun in the outer main-belt at a distance of 2.6–3.6 AU once every 5 years and 6 months (2,014 days). Its orbit has an eccentricity of 0.15 and an inclination of 17° with respect to the ecliptic. The first observation used for the body's observation arc was taken at the discovering observatory on 4 February 1926, or 22 days after its official discovering observation.

== Naming ==
This minor planet was named in memory of German astronomer Josef Hopmann (1890–1975), a director of Vienna Observatory between 1951 and 1962, a productive observer of variable and binary stars, and a participant in the international program to observe near-Earth asteroid 433 Eros in the early 1930s. The lunar crater Hopmann is also named in his honour. The official naming citation was published by the Minor Planet Center on 15 October 1977 (M.P.C. 4237).

== Physical characteristics ==
According to the survey carried out by the Infrared Astronomical Satellite IRAS, Hopmann measures 35.51 kilometers in diameter. The Collaborative Asteroid Lightcurve Link agrees with the Supplemental IRAS Minor Planet Survey (SIMPS) data and derives an albedo of 0.039 and a diameter of 35.47 kilometers, while observations with NASA's Wide-field Infrared Survey Explorer and its subsequent NEOWISE mission gave an albedo of 0.06 and a diameter of 44.33 kilometers.

In January and February 2012, three rotational lightcurves were obtained by Robert Stephens at Santana Observatory (646), California, Josep Maria Aymami at Carmelita Observatory (B20), Barcelona, and Patricia Moravec at Oakley Southern Sky Observatory (E09), Australia. The lightcurves gave a well-defined rotation period of 17.476, 17.478 and 17.480 hours, respectively, with a brightness variation between 0.36 and 0.44 magnitude (U=3/3/3-). In 2016, a re-modeled lightcurve, constructed from data compiled in the Lowell Photometric Database, also gave a concurring period.
