= Josef Hopmann =

German astronomer

Josef Hopmann (22 December 1890 – 11 October 1975) was a German astronomer.

He was born in Berlin and received his education at universities in Bonn and Berlin, then became an assistant at Bonn Observatory in 1914. In 1930 he became a full professor and was appointed director of the Leipzig Observatory and Vienna Observatory. Between 1918 and 1974 he published nearly 100 scientific papers. In 1931–32, he and Heribert Schneller discovered that Zeta Aurigae is an eclipsing binary.

The minor planet 1985 Hopmann is named after him, as is the crater Hopmann on the far side of the Moon.
