= Kurt Alder =

German chemist (1902–1958)

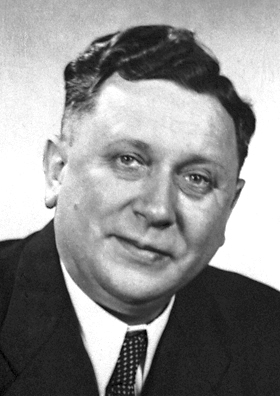
- Born: 10 July 1902; Königshütte (Chorzów), German Empire
- Died: 20 June 1958 (aged 55); Cologne, West Germany
- Education: University of Berlin; University of Kiel
- Known for: Diels–Alder reaction Alder-ene reaction
- Awards: Nobel Prize for Chemistry (1950)
- Scientific career
- Fields: Organic chemistry
- Workplaces: I G Farben Industrie, University of Cologne

Kurt Alder (German pronunciation: [ˈkʊʁt ˈaldɐ]; 10 July 1902 – 20 June 1958) was a German chemist and Nobel laureate.

== Biography ==
Alder was born, as a teacher's son, in the industrial area of Königshütte, Silesia (modern day Chorzów, Upper Silesia, Poland), where he received his early schooling. Alder left the area when Königshütte became part of Poland in 1922. He studied chemistry at the University of Berlin from 1922, and later at the University of Kiel where his PhD was awarded in 1926 for work supervised by Otto Paul Hermann Diels.

In 1930 Alder was appointed reader for chemistry at Kiel, and promoted to lecturer in 1934. In 1936 he left Kiel to join I G Farben Industrie at Leverkusen, where he worked on synthetic rubber. Then in 1940 he was appointed Professor of Experimental Chemistry and Chemical Technology at the University of Cologne and Director of the Institute of Chemistry there. Throughout this time and despite the many obstacles to original research in Europe at the time, he continued a systematic program of investigations of his particular interests in the synthesis of organic compounds. In all he published more than 151 papers in this field.

In 1945 he worked closely with the inventor of EDTA, Ferdinand Münz. In 1949 they published a paper together on diene synthesis and additions

Alder received several honorary degrees and other awards, such as the 1950 Nobel Prize in Chemistry which he shared with his teacher Diels for their work on the Diels–Alder reaction. The lunar crater Alder is named in his honour. The insecticide aldrin, created through a Diels–Alder reaction, is also named after the scientist.

Alder died in June 1958, aged 55. The cause of his death is unknown, however his body was found in his apartment in Cologne, Germany after two weeks. Just before his death, he had written in a letter to the Standing Committee for the Meetings of Nobel Laureates: "The relentless and ever-increasing demands placed on active German university professors by constantly new tasks have, in my case, after years of depleting my strength, led to exhaustion, prompting urgent medical advice that I should, for the time being, take complete rest."

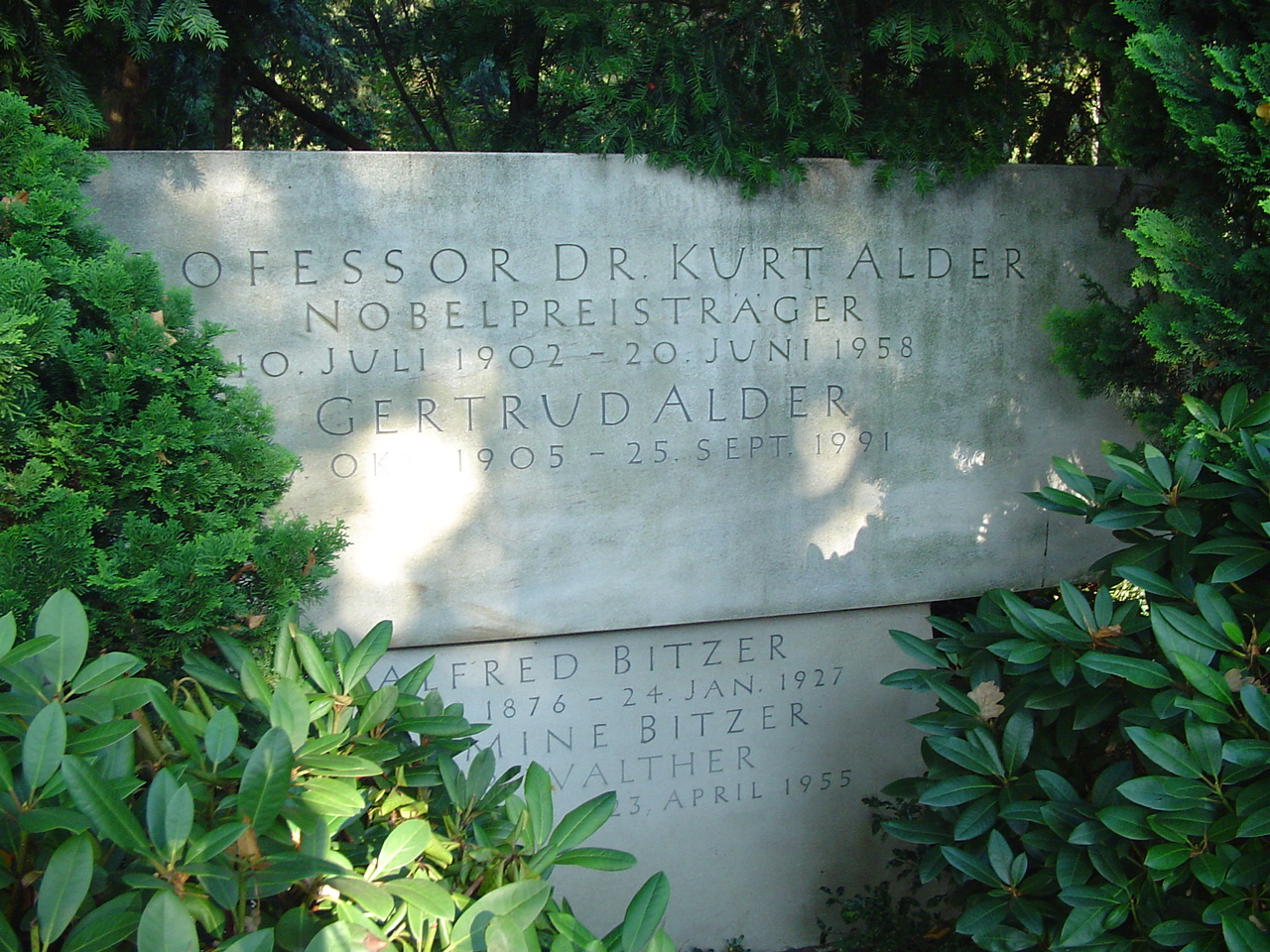
Grave site of Kurt Alder

== Sources ==
- Diels, O.; Alder, K. (1928). "Synthesen in der hydroaromatischen Reihe". Justus Liebigs Annalen der Chemie. 460 (1): 98–122. doi:10.1002/jlac.19284600106.
- Ihde, Aaron J. (1970). "Kurt Alder". Dictionary of Scientific Biography. Vol. 1. New York: Charles Scribner's Sons. pp. 105–106. ISBN 0-684-10114-9.
