= Spiru Haret =

Romanian mathematician, astronomer and politician

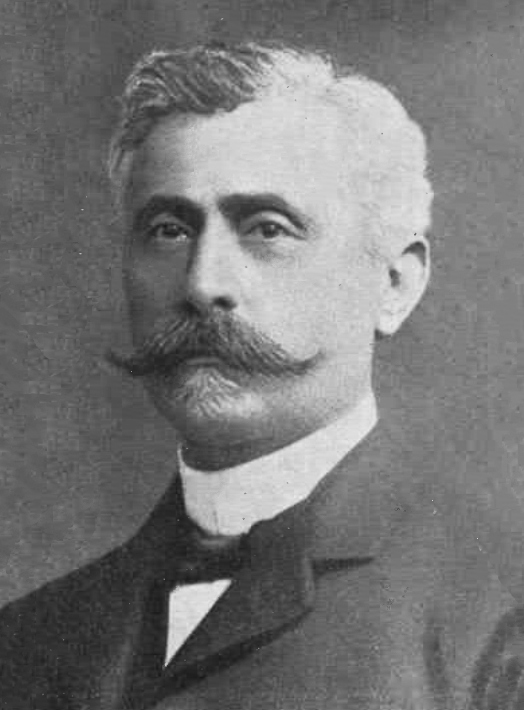
- Born: Spiridon Haret; 15 February 1851; Iași, Moldavia
- Died: 17 December 1912 (aged 61); Bucharest, Kingdom of Romania
- Resting place: Bellu Cemetery, Bucharest, Romania
- Education: Saint Sava National College
- Alma mater: University of Bucharest; University of Paris
- Known for: N-body problem Romanian education system
- Spouse: Ana Popescu (m. 1883)
- Scientific career
- Fields: Mathematics, Astronomy
- Workplaces: University of Bucharest; School of Bridges and Roads
- Thesis: Sur l’invariabilité des grandes axes des orbites planétaires (1878)
- Doctoral advisor: Victor Puiseux

Minister of Religious Affairs and Public Instruction
- In office 31 March 1897 – 30 March 1899
- Prime Minister: Dimitrie Sturdza
- Preceded by: George Mârzescu
- Succeeded by: Take Ionescu
- In office 14 February 1901 – 20 December 1904
- Prime Minister: Dimitrie Sturdza
- Preceded by: Constantin C. Arion
- Succeeded by: Mihail Vlădescu
- In office 12 March 1907 – 28 December 1910
- Prime Minister: Dimitrie Sturdza; Ion I. C. Brătianu
- Preceded by: Constantin Istrati
- Succeeded by: Constantin C. Arion

Interior Minister
- In office 13 December 1904 – 20 December 1904
- Prime Minister: Dimitrie Sturdza
- Preceded by: Vasile Lascăr
- Succeeded by: Gheorghe Grigore Cantacuzino

Spiru C. Haret (Romanian pronunciation: [ˈspiru haˈret]; 15 February 1851 – 17 December 1912) was a Romanian mathematician, astronomer, and politician. He made a fundamental contribution to the n-body problem in celestial mechanics by proving that using a third degree approximation for the disturbing forces implies instability of the major axes of the orbits, and by introducing the concept of secular perturbations in relation to this.

As a politician, during his three terms as Minister of Education, Haret ran deep reforms, building the modern Romanian education system. He was made a full member of the Romanian Academy in 1892.

He also founded the Bucharest Astronomical Observatory, appointing Nicolae Coculescu as its first director. The crater Haret on the Moon is named after him.

== Life ==
Haret was born in Iași, Moldavia, to Constantin and Smaranda Haret, who were of Armenian origin. His baptismal record listed his name as Spiridon Haret. He started his studies in Dorohoi Iași, and in 1862 moved to Saint Sava High School in Bucharest. He showed an early talent for mathematics, publishing two textbooks (one in algebra and one in trigonometry) when he was still a high school student. In 1869 he entered the University of Bucharest, where he studied physics and mathematics. In 1870, while a student in his second term, he became teacher of mathematics at the Nifon Seminary in Bucharest, but quit the following year in order to continue his studies. In 1874, at age 23, he graduated with a degree in physics and mathematics.

After graduation, Haret won a scholarship competition organized by Titu Maiorescu and went to Paris in order to study mathematics at the Sorbonne. There he earned a mathematics diploma in 1875 and a physics diploma in 1876. Two years later (on 18 January 1878), he earned his Ph.D. by defending his thesis, Sur l’invariabilité des grandes axes des orbites planétaires (On the invariability of the major axis of planetary orbits), in front of examiners led by Victor Puiseux, his Ph.D. advisor. In this work he proved a result fundamental for the n-body problem in astronomy, the thesis being published in volume 18 of Annales de l'Observatoire de Paris. Haret was the first Romanian to obtain a Ph.D. degree in Paris.

After his return to Romania in 1878, Haret largely abandoned scientific research and dedicated the rest of his life to improving Romanian education, which was heavily underdeveloped at the time, both as professor and as politician. He was appointed professor of rational mechanics at the Faculty of Science of the University of Bucharest. The next year (1879), Haret became a correspondent member of the Romanian Academy, receiving full membership in 1892. He kept the professorship at the Faculty of Science until his retirement in 1910, when he was followed as professor of mechanics by Dimitrie Pompeiu. From 1882 he was also a professor of analytical geometry at the School of Bridges and Roads in Bucharest. After retirement, Haret occasionally lectured at the informal People's University.

Haret was the Minister of Public Education in three liberal governments, between 1897 and 1899, 1901–1904, and 1907–1910. As Minister of Education he ran a complete reform, basically building the modern Romanian education system.

The folk song "Cântă cucu-n Bucovina" ("Sings the Cuckoo in Bukovina") was composed in 1904 by Constantin Mandicevschi at Haret's request for commemorating the 400th anniversary of the death of Prince of Moldavia Stephen the Great.

In January 1883, he married in Buzău a local, Ana Popescu, 15 years his junior. The two had a son, Ion, who died at age 1, and later adopted a child, Mihai. Haret died in Bucharest in 1912 of cancer, and was buried in the city's Bellu Cemetery; Ana Haret died in 1941, aged 74.

== Scientific activity ==
Haret's major scientific contribution was made in 1878, in his Ph.D. thesis Sur l’invariabilité des grandes axes des orbites planétaires. At the time it was known that planets disturb each other's orbits, thus deviating from the elliptic motion described by Johannes Kepler’s First Law. Pierre Laplace (in 1773) and Joseph Louis Lagrange (in 1776) had already studied the problem, both of them showing that the major axes of the orbits are stable, by using a first degree approximation of the perturbing forces. In 1808 Siméon Denis Poisson had proved that the stability also holds when using second degree approximations. In his thesis, Haret proved by using third degree approximations that the axes are not stable as previously believed, but instead feature a time variability, which he called secular perturbations. This result implies that planetary motion is not absolutely stable. Henri Poincaré considered this result a great surprise and continued Haret’s research, which eventually led him to the creation of chaos theory. Haret established the instability of the model of the n-body problem assuming frequencies to be incommensurable; Poincaré also took into account commensurabilities, and using generalized Fourier series (which generate quasi-periodic solutions), he proved the divergence of these series (which means instability), thus confirming Haret’s result. Félix Tisserand recommended the extension of Haret's method to other astronomic problems and, much later, in 1955, Jean Meffroy restarted Haret’s research using new techniques.

Soon after his return to Romania, Haret abandoned research, focusing for the rest of his life on teaching and, as Minister of Education, on the reform of the education system. He only published an article on the secular acceleration of the Moon in 1880 and one on Jupiter’s Great Red Spot (1912).

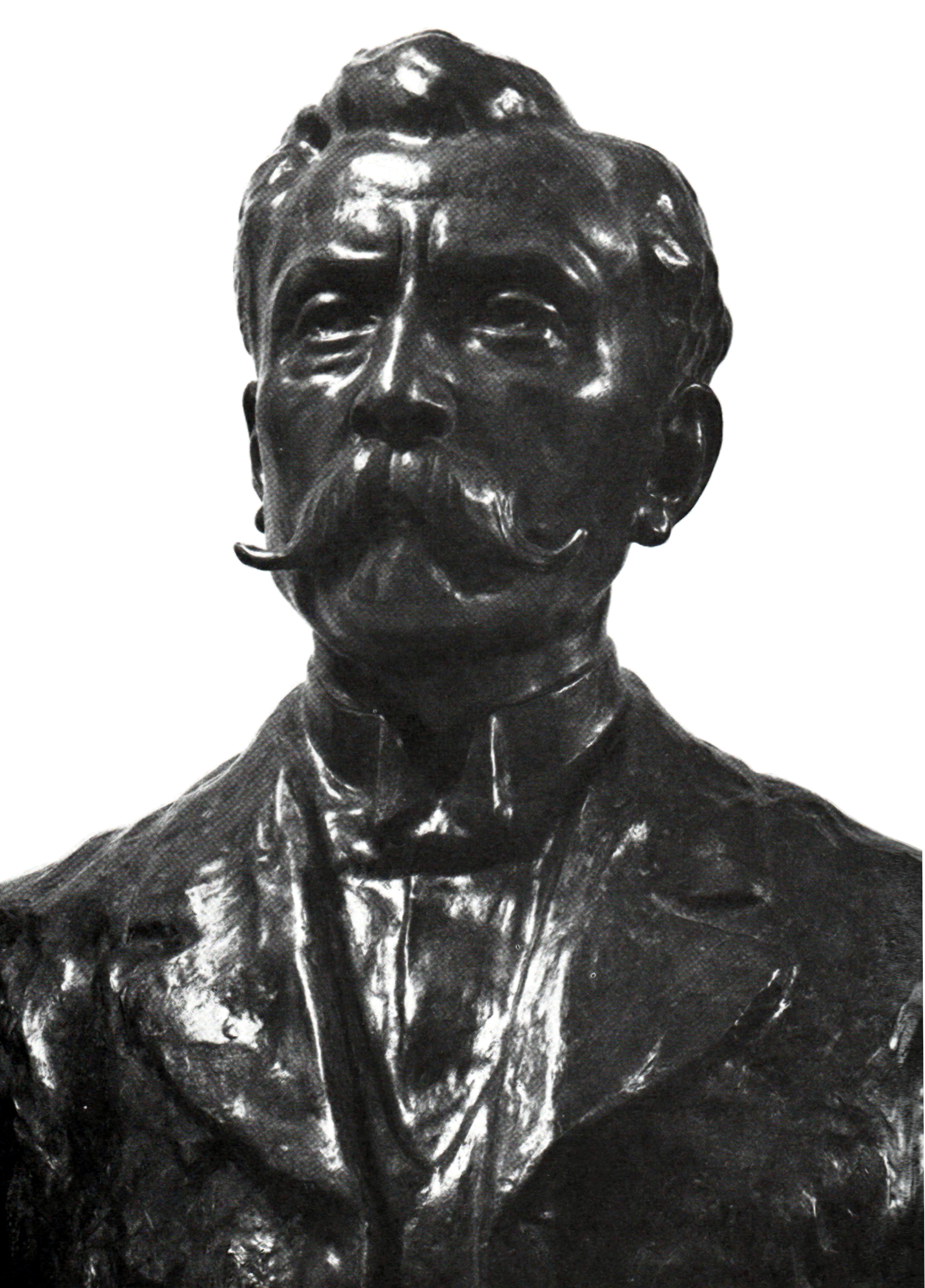
Bust of Spiru Haret by Dimitrie Paciurea

In 1910 he published Social mechanics, which used mathematics to explain social behaviour (somehow anticipating the fictional "psychohistory" branch of mathematics developed by Hari Seldon, the fictional character of Isaac Asimov's Foundation, published 40 years later).
