= Cabannes (crater) =

Lunar impact crater

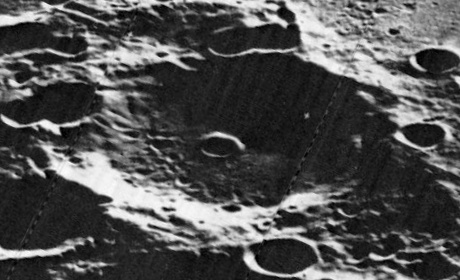
- Oblique Lunar Orbiter 5 image
- Coordinates: 60.9°S 169.6°W
- Diameter: 81.30 km (50.52 mi)
- Depth: Unknown
- Colongitude: 172° at sunrise
- Formation: Pre-Nectarian
- Eponym: Jean Cabannes

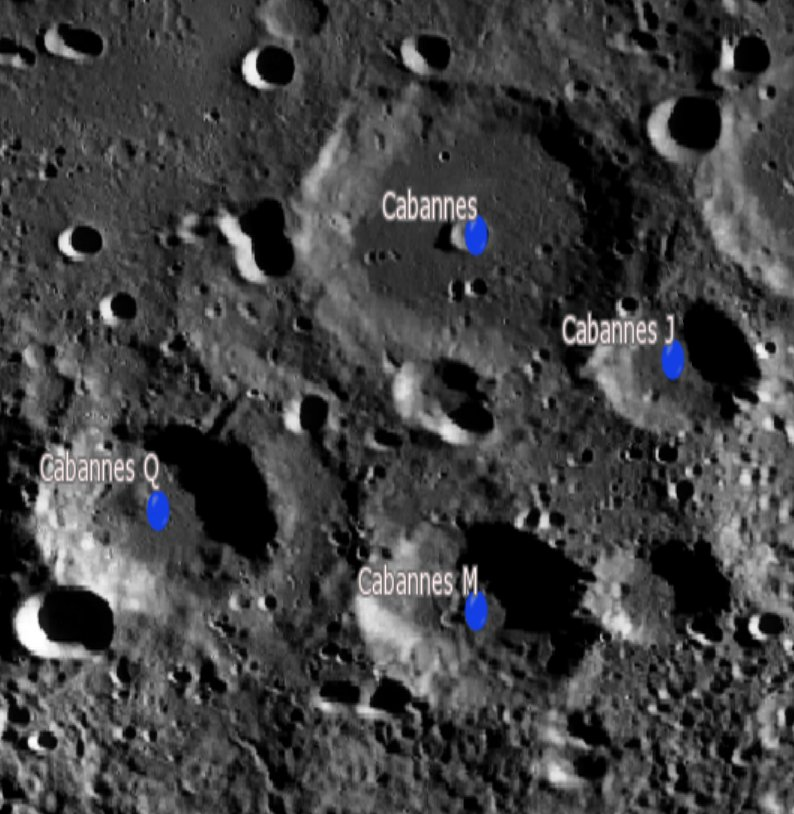
Satellite features of Cabannes

Cabannes is a lunar impact crater that lies in the southern hemisphere on the far side of the Moon. It dates to the Pre-Nectarian period on the lunar geologic timescale. This impact lies within the South Pole-Aitken basin, where it crosses the southern boundary of the basin's central compositional anomaly. The rim of Cabannes has been worn by subsequent impacts, with a smaller crater overlying the southern rim. However the formation has not been significantly reshaped by nearby craters.

The satellite crater Cabannes J is attached to the southeast rim, and lies between Cabannes and the heavily impacted crater Berlage. Just to the east is the crater Bellinsgauzen, and to the south is a large walled plain called Antoniadi.

This crater is named after French physicist Jean Cabannes (1885–1959). Its designation was adopted by the International Astronomical Union in 1970.

== Satellite craters ==
By convention these features are identified on lunar maps by placing the letter on the side of the crater midpoint that is closest to Cabannes.

| Cabannes | Latitude | Longitude | Diameter |
|---|---|---|---|
| J | 62.2° S | 167.2° W | 34 km |
| M | 64.2° S | 170.2° W | 48 km |
| Q | 63.3° S | 174.5° W | 49 km |
