= Abbe (crater) =

Lunar impact crater

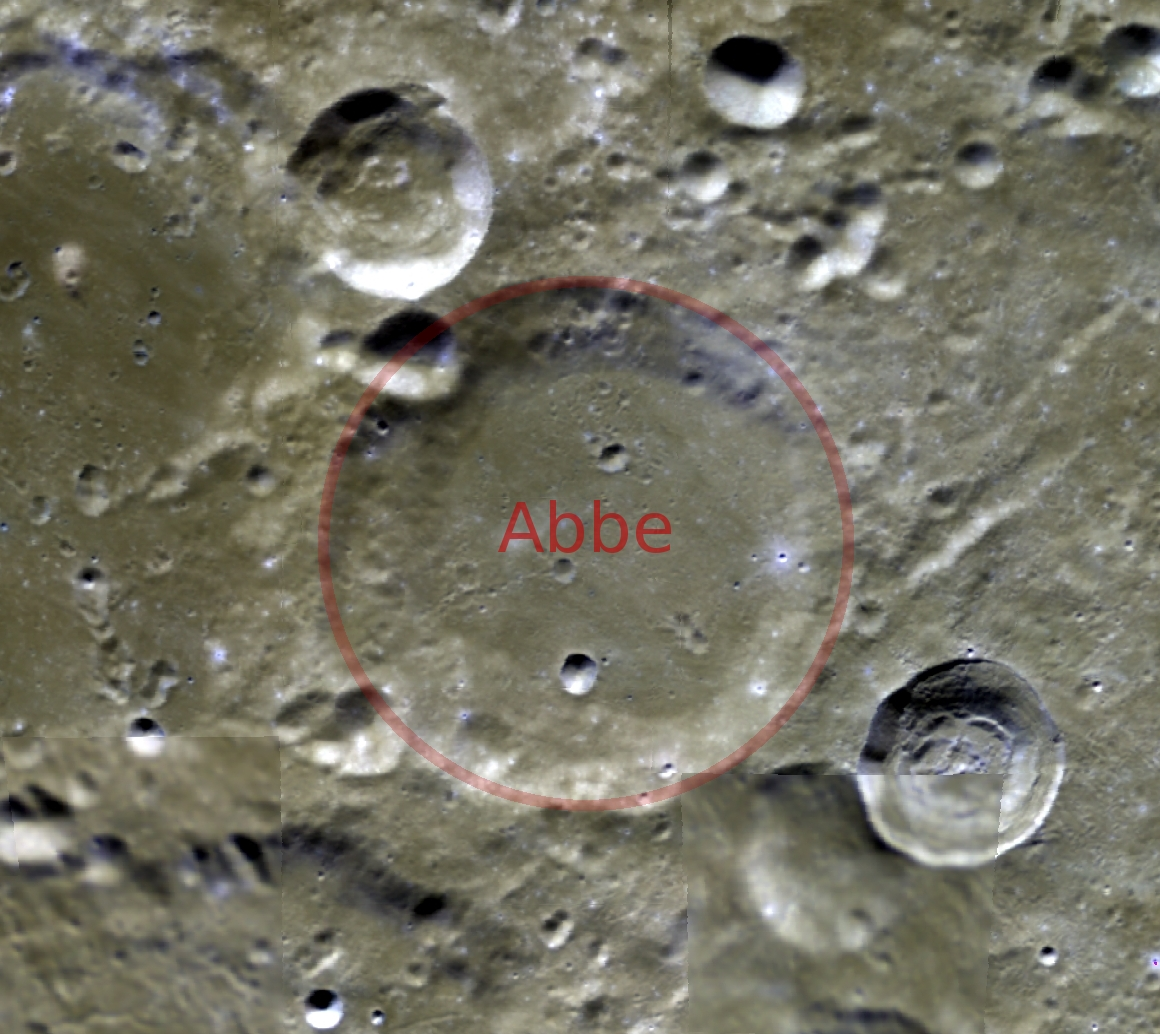
- Abbe crater, with Hess M to its upper left and Abbe H to its lower right
- Coordinates: 57.3°S 175.2°E
- Diameter: 63.98 km (39.76 mi) km
- Depth: 6.953 km (4.320 mi)
- Colongitude: 187° at sunrise
- Formation: Pre-Nectarian
- Eponym: Ernst Abbe

Abbe is a lunar impact crater that lies in the southern hemisphere on the far side of the Moon. It is located just to the south of the crater Hess, and lies to the east of the large walled basin Poincaré.

On the lunar geologic timescale, this formation dates to the Pre-Nectarian period. The outer wall of Abbe is somewhat eroded, with small craters lying across the northwest and southwest rim crests. The interior floor is relatively smooth, with a few tiny craterlets marking the surface. The maximum depth of the crater floor is 6,953 m.

This crater is named after the German physicist Ernst Abbe (1840–1905). Its designation was officially adopted by the International Astronomical Union in 1970.

== Satellite craters ==
By convention these features are identified on lunar maps by placing the letter on the side of the crater midpoint that is closest to Abbe.

Abbe	Latitude	Longitude	Diameter
H	58.2° S	177.9° E	25 km
K	59.6° S	177.3° E	28 km
M	61.6° S	175.3° E	29 km

== Gallery ==
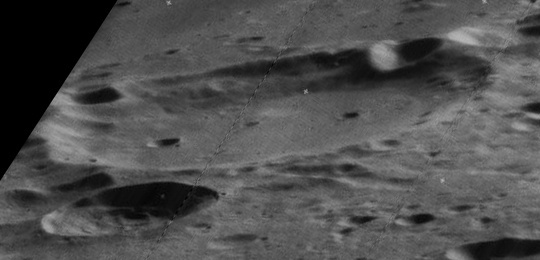
Oblique view of Abbe, facing west. Lunar Orbiter 5 image.

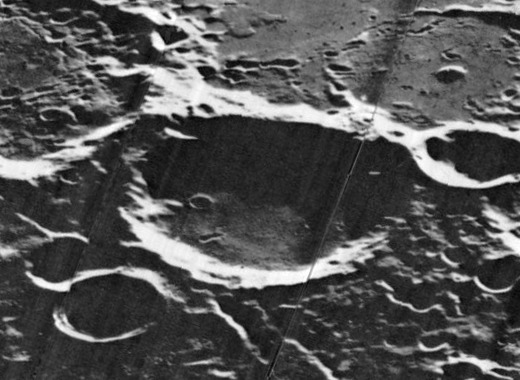
Another Lunar Orbiter 5 view of Abbe, facing west.

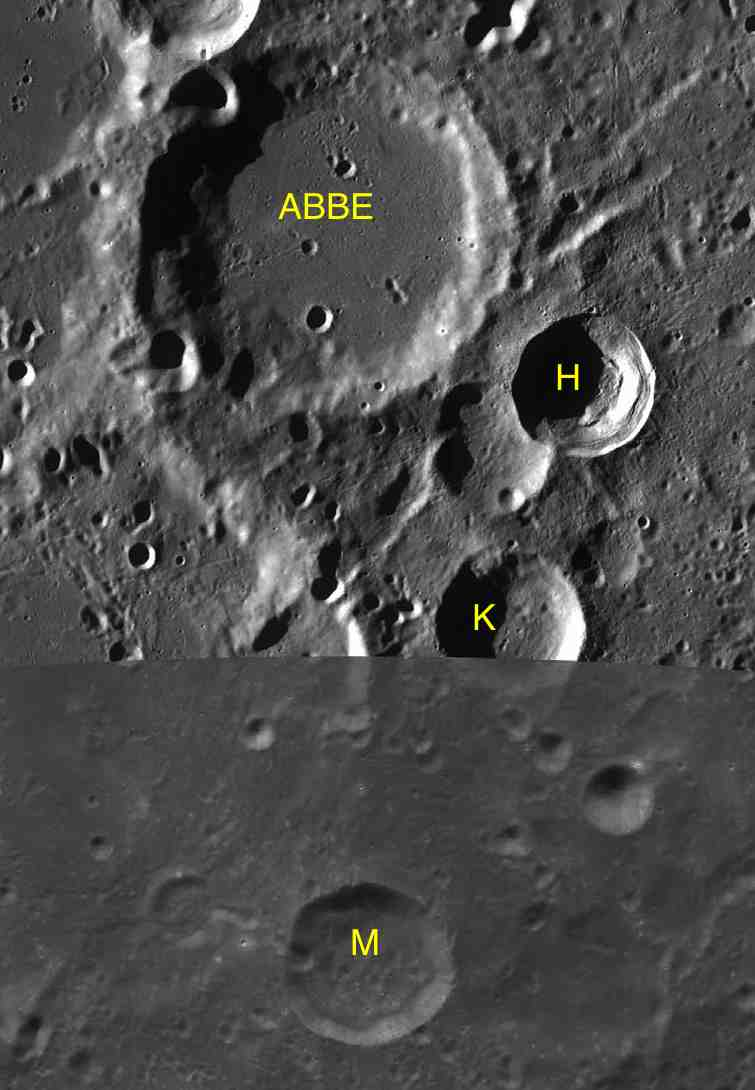
Map showing the satellite craters of Abbe
