= List of things named after Charles-Augustin de Coulomb =

A list of things named for French physicist Charles-Augustin de Coulomb (1736–1806). For additional uses of the term, see coulomb (disambiguation)

- coulomb (symbol C), the SI unit of electric charge
- Coulomb's law
- Coulomb barrier
- Coulomb blockade
- Coulomb collision
- Coulomb damping
- Coulomb excitation
- Coulomb explosion
- Coulomb friction
- Coulomb gap
- Coulomb gauge
- Coulomb Hamiltonian
- Coulomb logarithm
- Coulomb operator
- Coulomb phase
- Coulomb potential
- Coulomb scattering (Rutherford scattering)
- Coulomb scattering state
- Coulomb stress transfer
- Coulomb wave function
  - A coulomb wave function is a solution to the coulomb wave equation
- Coulomb, a lunar crater
  - Coulomb-Sarton Basin, lunar basin named after the craters Coulomb and Sarton
- Coulometry
- Interatomic Coulombic decay
- Mohr–Coulomb theory
- Screened Coulomb Potentials Implicit Solvent Model
- Statcoulomb (Symbol statC)

== See also ==
- Coulomb (disambiguation)
- Coulombs (disambiguation)
