= Coulomb (disambiguation) =

The coulomb (symbol: C) is a unit of electric charge, named after French physicist Charles-Augustin de Coulomb.

Coulomb may also refer to:

== People ==
- Charles-Augustin de Coulomb (1736–1806), French physicist and namesake of the term coulomb
  - Coulomb's law, a law of physics first published by Coulomb in 1785
  - List of things named after Charles-Augustin de Coulomb
- A family of French naval architects
  - François Coulomb the Elder (1654–1717)
  - François Coulomb the Younger (1691–1751)
  - Joseph-Marie-Blaise Coulomb, (1728–1803)
- Adrien Coulomb (born 1990), French professional footballer
- Jean Coulomb (1904–1999), French mathematician, geophysicist and scientific administrator

== Places ==
- Coulomb (crater), a lunar crater named after the French physicist
- Saint-Coulomb, a French commune

== Other ==
- Coulomb (submarine), a Brumaire-class submarine of the French Navy
- COULOMB, a high-energy physics experiment at CERN that ran from 1979 to 1995
- Coulomb Affair, a theosophical conflict in the 1870s
- Coulomb Technologies, former name of electric vehicle infrastructure company ChargePoint
- Coulomb stress transfer, a concept used to study how earthquakes influence hazard on other faults.

== See also ==
- Coulombs (disambiguation)
- Coulombe, a surname
- Colombo (surname)
