= Razumov (crater) =

Crater on the Moon

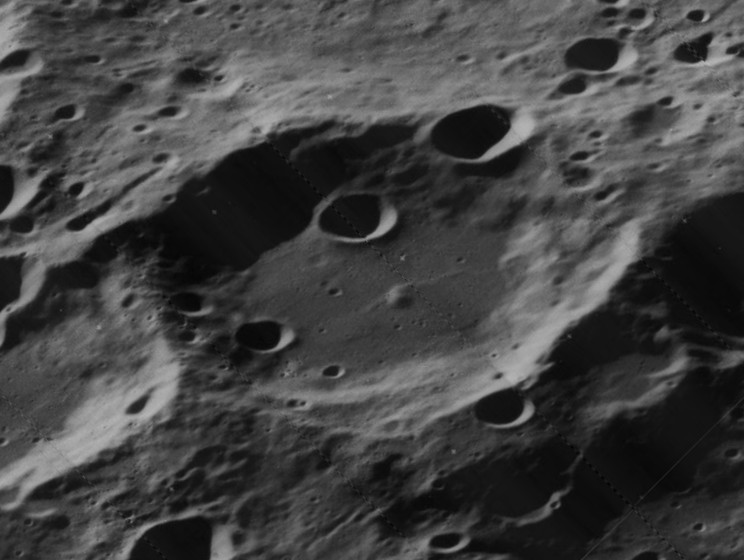
- Oblique Lunar Orbiter 5 image, facing west
- Coordinates: 38.95°N 114.63°W
- Diameter: 75.08 km (46.65 mi)
- Depth: Unknown
- Colongitude: 115° at sunrise
- Eponym: Vladimir V. Razumov

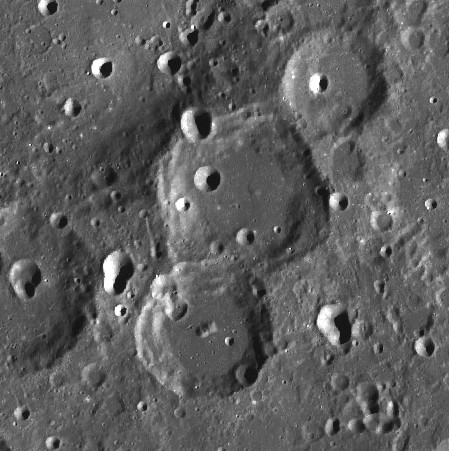
Razumov at center, Petropavlovskiy below center

Razumov is an impact crater on the far side of the Moon, beyond the northwestern limb as seen from the Earth. It lies along the southeastern outer rim of the walled plain named Landau. Intruding slightly into the southern rim is the slightly smaller crater Petropavlovskiy. To the west-southwest lies Frost.

This crater has a worn outer rim, with a small crater along the northwestern rim and outward bulges to the north-northeast and east-southeast. The interior floor has a small crater in the western half and small craterlets along the western and southern edges. It is otherwise marked only by a few small craters.

Prior to formal naming by the IAU in 1970, Razumov was called Crater 170.

== Satellite craters ==
By convention these features are identified on lunar maps by placing the letter on the side of the crater midpoint that is closest to Razumov.

| Razumov | Latitude | Longitude | Diameter |
|---|---|---|---|
| C | 40.8° N | 112.4° W | 48 km |
