= Charles-Augustin =

Charles-Augustin is a given name. Notable people with the name include:

- Charles-Augustin de Coulomb (1736–1806), French military engineer and physicist
- Charles V Augustin van de Werve, 3rd Count of Vorsselaer
- Charles Augustin Sainte-Beuve (1804–1869), French literary critic
