= Douglass (lunar crater) =

Lunar impact crater

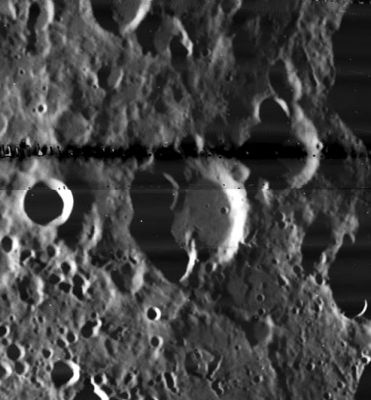
- Normalized Lunar Orbiter 5 image
- Coordinates: 35.50°N 122.72°W
- Diameter: 50.95 km (31.66 mi)
- Depth: Unknown
- Colongitude: 123° at sunrise
- Eponym: Andrew E. Douglass

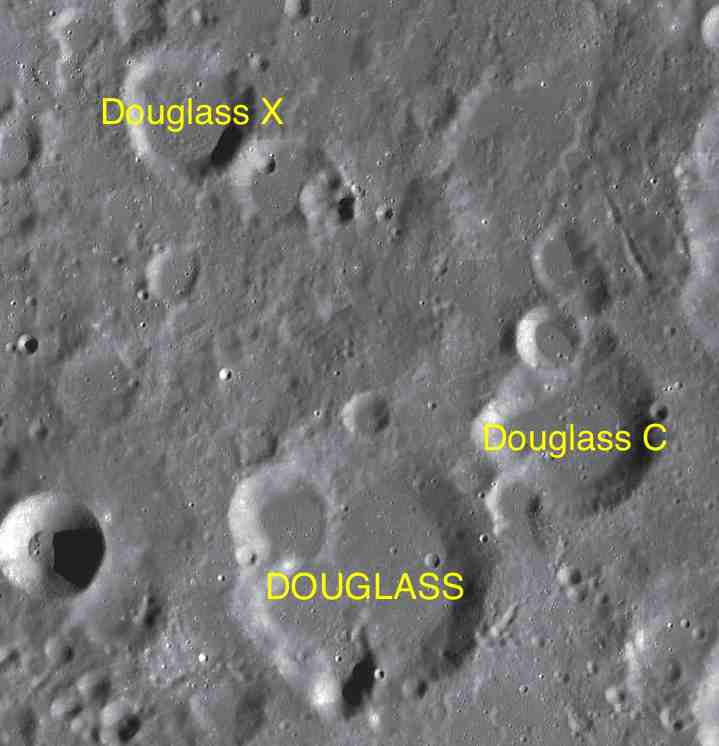
Satellite features of Douglass

Douglass is a lunar impact crater on the far side of the Moon. It lies to the southwest of the crater Frost and south-southwest of a large walled plain named Landau.

The western rim has been shaped by several interior impacts, most notably the remnant of a crater that cuts an outward notch in the northwestern rim. The southeastern rim of this interior crater is now little more than a low rise across the floor of Douglass. Another impact along the southern side has produced a smaller outward bulge and a portion of the rim forms a ridge protruding into the interior floor. Smaller craters lie along the northeastern rim. The remainder of the rim is worn and rounded, and the interior floor is otherwise level and featureless.

This formation is named after American astronomer Andrew E. Douglass (1867-1962). Its designation was officially adopted by the International Astronomical Union in 1970. Previously, Douglass was identified as Crater 162.

== Satellite craters ==
By convention these features are identified on lunar maps by placing the letter on the side of the crater midpoint that is closest to Douglass.

Douglass	Latitude	Longitude	Diameter
C	36.7° N	121.0° W	28 km
X	38.4° N	123.8° W	23 km
