= Coulombe =

Coulombe is a surname. Notable people with the surname include:

- Benoit Coulombe (born 1958), Canadian scientist
- Carmen Coulombe (1946–2008), Canadian artist
- Charles Coulombe (disambiguation), multiple people
- Clotilde Coulombe (1892–1985), Canadian classical pianist and Roman Catholic nun
- Danny Coulombe (born 1989), American baseball player
- Gary Coulombe, American politician
- Guy Coulombe (1936–2011), Canadian civil servant
- Joe Coulombe (1930–2020), American businessman and founder of Trader Joe's
- Julie Coulombe, American politician
- Martine Coulombe, Canadian politician
- Patrick Coulombe (born 1985), Canadian ice hockey player

== See also ==
- François Coulombe-Fortier (born 1984), Canadian taekwondo practitioner
- Coulomb (disambiguation), includes a list of people with surname Coulomb
