= Petropavlovskiy (crater) =

Crater on the Moon

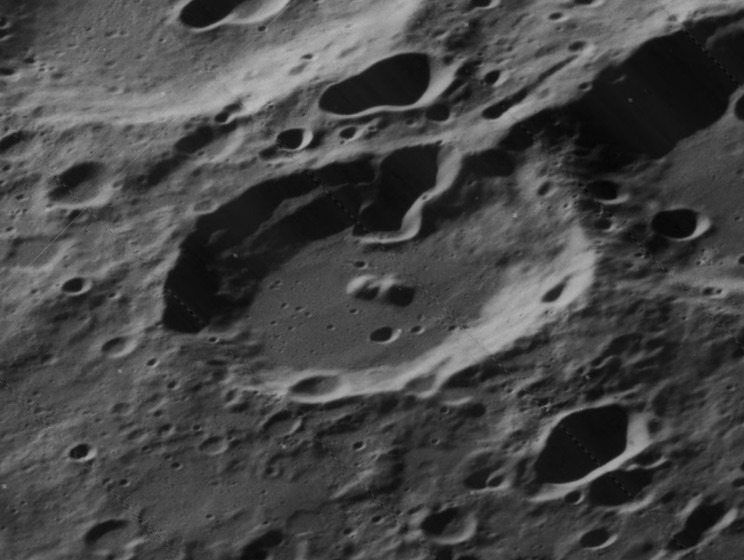
- Oblique Lunar Orbiter 5 image, facing west
- Coordinates: 36.92°N 115.28°W
- Diameter: 64.07 km (39.81 mi)
- Depth: Unknown
- Colongitude: 116° at sunrise
- Eponym: Boris S. Petropavlovskiy

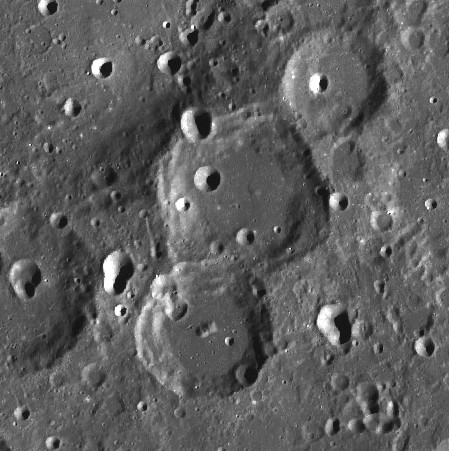
Razumov at center, Petropavlovskiy below center

Petropavlovsky is a crater on the far side of the Moon. It is attached to the southern rim of the slightly larger crater Razumov, intruding slightly into the interior. Just to the west is the crater Frost, along the southern rim of the walled plain called Landau.

This is a moderately eroded feature, with a worn outer rim that is marked by several lesser impacts. A merged pair of small craters cuts across the northwestern rim and inner wall, and another craterlet lies along the southeast rim. The interior floor is relatively level, except for a double central peak formation at the midpoint.

The crater was named in 1970 after Boris Sergeevich Petropavlovsky, a Soviet rocket pioneer. Petropavlovskiy was called Crater 168 prior to naming.

== Satellite craters ==
By convention these features are identified on lunar maps by placing the letter on the side of the crater midpoint that is closest to Petropavlovskiy.

Petropavlovskiy	Latitude	Longitude	Diameter
M	34.5° N	114.7° W	22 km
