= Ellison (crater) =

Lunar impact crater

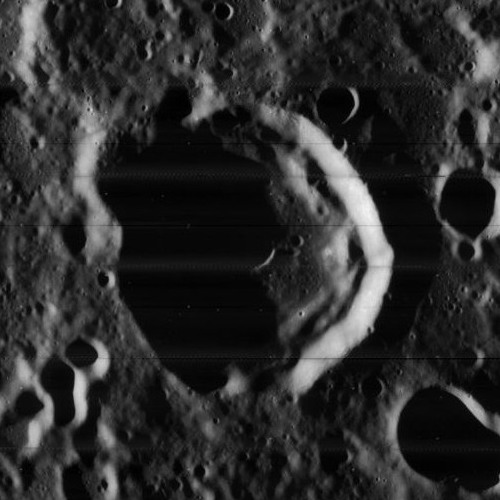
- Lunar Orbiter 5 image
- Coordinates: 55.1°N 107.5°W
- Diameter: 36.99 km (22.98 mi)
- Depth: Unknown
- Colongitude: 108° at sunrise
- Formation: Early Imbrian
- Eponym: Mervyn A. Ellison

Ellison is a lunar impact crater that lies on the far side of the Moon from the Earth. It is located just beyond the northwest limb of the Moon, to the southwest of the large walled plain named Poczobutt. Due west of Ellison is the crater Coulomb. Ellison lies at the approximate margin of the Coulomb-Sarton Basin, a 530 km wide impact crater of Pre-Nectarian age.

This crater dates to the Early Imbrian period of the lunar geologic timescale. The outer rim of Ellison is roughly circular, with an inward protrusion along the southern rim and a slight outward bulge to the wet-northwest. It has a single terrace on the northeastern inner wall, formed from the slumping of material. Instead of a central peak, there is a small crater located at the midpoint. A smaller crater is located just to the west-southwest of this centrally located formation, but the flat interior floor is otherwise devoid of features of interest.

This formation is named after Irish-born British astronomer Mervyn Archdall Ellison (1909-1963). Its designation was formally adopted in 1970 by the International Astronomical Union.

== Satellite craters ==
By convention these features are identified on lunar maps by placing the letter on the side of the crater midpoint that is closest to Ellison.

Ellison	Latitude	Longitude	Diameter
P	52.8° N	109.6° W	32 km
