= Perrine (crater) =

Lunar impact crater

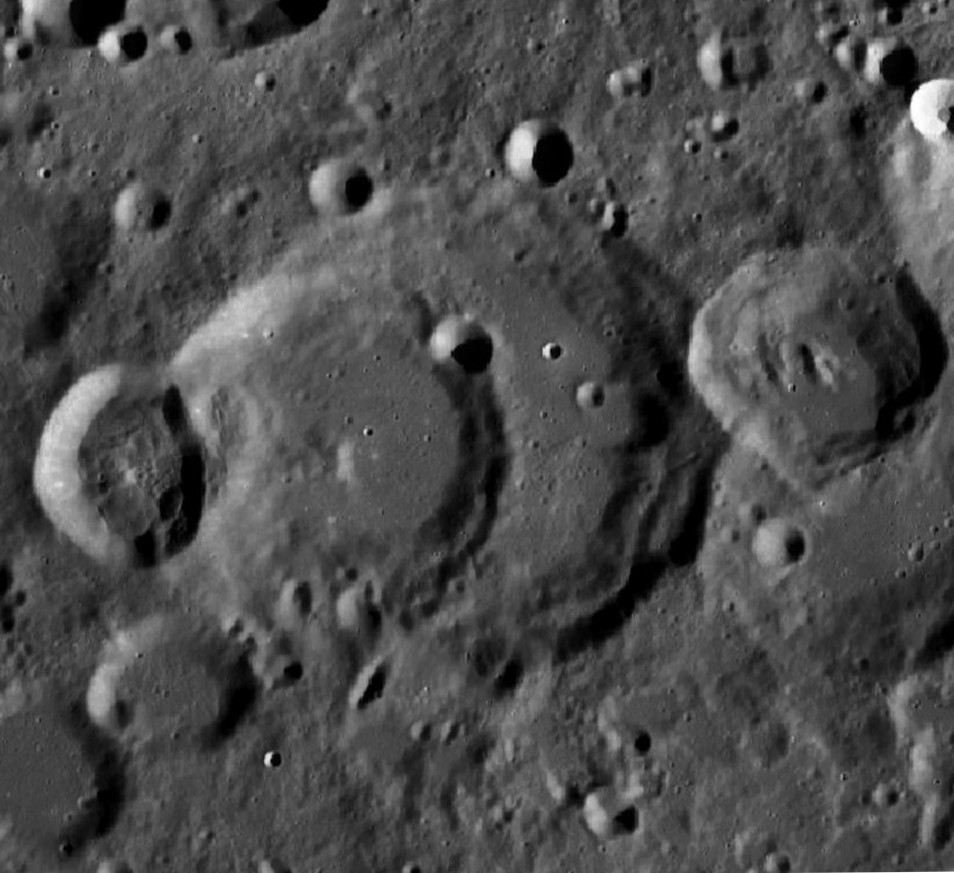
- LRO image. Perrine is at center. Perrine S crater covers the western portion, and the young crater Perrine T disrupts the walls of the older craters.
- Coordinates: 42.11°N 127.95°W
- Diameter: 87.41 km (54.31 mi)
- Depth: Unknown
- Colongitude: 128° at sunrise
- Eponym: Charles D. Perrine

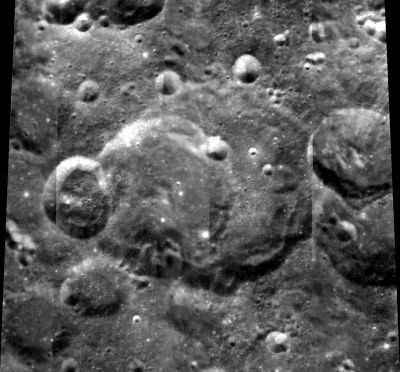
Clementine mosaic

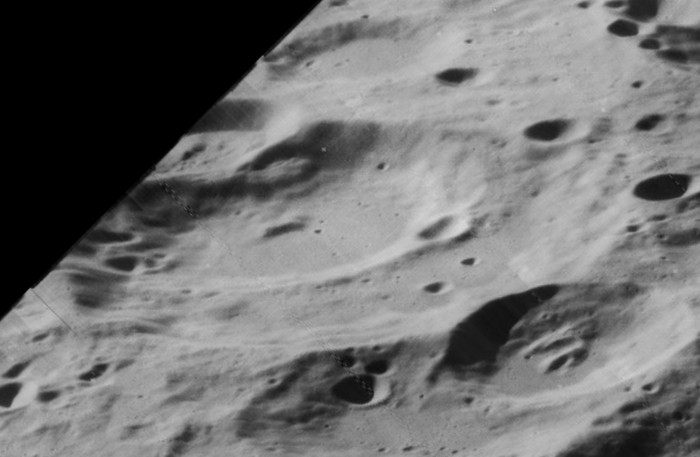
Oblique Lunar Orbiter 5 image, facing west

Perrine is a lunar impact crater that is located on the northern hemisphere on the far side of the Moon. It lies to the west of the large walled plain named Landau, and to the northeast of the crater Charlier. To the north-northwest is the smaller Gullstrand.

This is an unusual formation that forms part of a chain of connected craters. The western two-thirds of Perrine is overlain by the slightly smaller Perrine S, so that Perrine is crescent-shaped. The western rim of Perrine S is overlain by the still-smaller Perrine T. Perrine S has a worn outer rim, and a small central peak in the middle of the floor.

The surviving rim of Perrine is worn and eroded, with the overlapping pair Perrine E and Perrine G intruding slightly into the eastern rim. A smaller crater has disrupted the southwest end of the outer rim, and a pair of small craters are attached to the northern rim.

Only a small portion of the interior floor of Perrine still survives, forming a crescent-shaped surface between the outer rampart of Perrine S and the inner wall of Perrine. It is marked by a pair of tiny craterlets in the northern half.

The crater was formally named by the IAU in 1970, after Charles D. Perrine. The satellite craters Perrine G and Perrine S were called Crater 94 and Crater 91, respectively.

== Satellite craters ==
By convention these features are identified on lunar maps by placing the letter on the side of the crater midpoint that is closest to Perrine.

Perrine	Latitude	Longitude	Diameter
E	42.8° N	124.9° W	40 km
G	42.1° N	124.6° W	58 km
L	39.2° N	127.2° W	37 km
S	42.5° N	128.6° W	63 km
T	42.4° N	130.2° W	34 km
