= Kramers (crater) =

Lunar impact crater

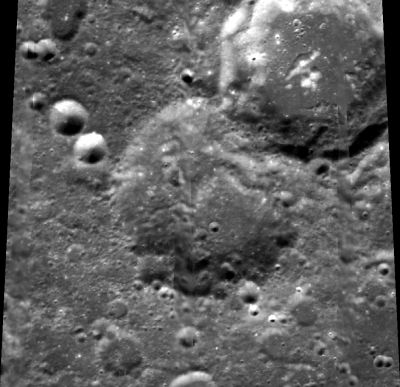
- Clementine mosaic
- Coordinates: 53.28°N 127.98°W
- Diameter: 61.59 km (38.27 mi)
- Depth: Unknown
- Eponym: Hendrik A. Kramers

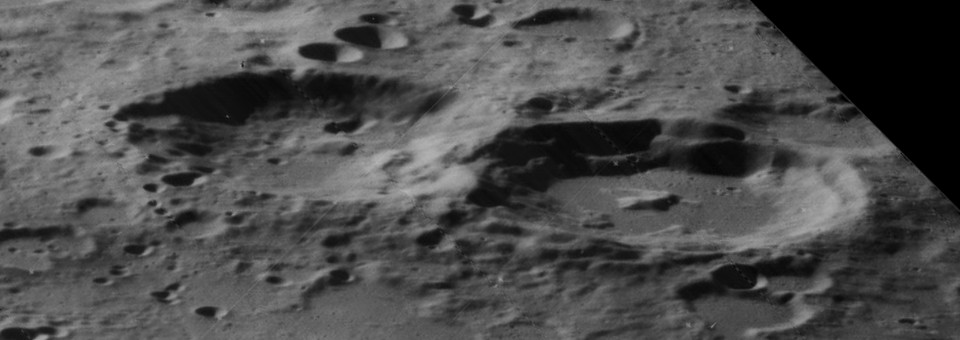
Oblique Lunar Orbiter 5 image of Kramers (left) and Kramers C (right), facing west

Kramers is an old lunar impact crater that is located on the northern hemisphere on the far side of the Moon. It lies some distance to the west of the larger crater Coulomb, and to the northwest of the smaller Weber, and it was named after Hendrik Anthony Kramers, a Dutch physicist, in 1970.

The outer rim of Kramers is heavily eroded and worn, although the perimeter of the original crater can be readily discerned. The younger, but comparably sized formation Kramers C intrudes into the northeast rim, and the two form a crater pair. The later crater has a terraced inner wall and a central peak at the midpoint.

Kramers lies within the Coulomb-Sarton Basin, a 530 km wide impact crater of Pre-Nectarian age.

== Satellite craters ==
By convention these features are identified on lunar maps by placing the letter on the side of the crater midpoint that is closest to Kramers.

Kramers	Latitude	Longitude	Diameter
C	55.0° N	125.6° W	59.64 km
M	50.4° N	126.9° W	31.90 km
S	52.8° N	132.2° W	26.53 km
U	54.2° N	132.4° W	38.58 km
