= Weber (crater) =

Crater on the Moon

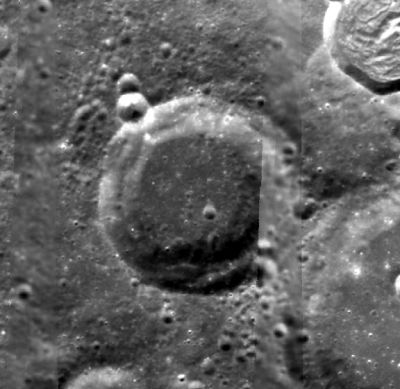
- Clementine mosaic
- Coordinates: 50.4°N 123.4°W
- Diameter: 42 km
- Depth: Unknown
- Colongitude: 124° at sunrise
- Eponym: Wilhelm E. Weber

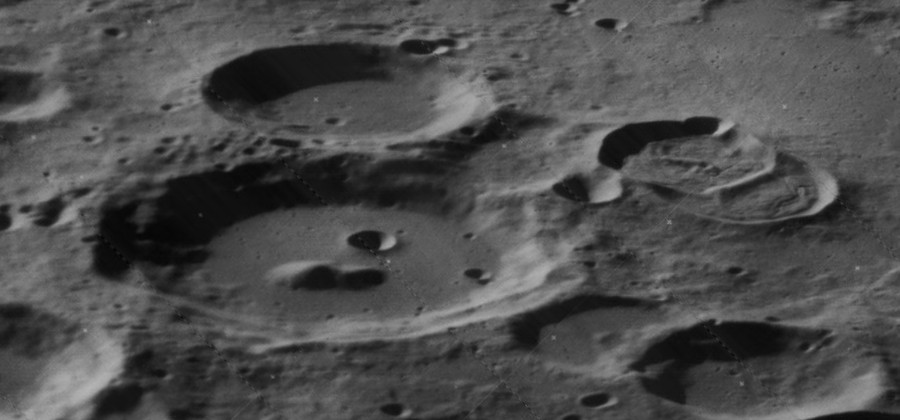
Oblique Lunar Orbiter 5 image, with Weber in upper left and Sarton in lower left, facing west

Weber is a lunar impact crater on the far side of the Moon, and it cannot be viewed directly from the Earth's surface. This crater is attached to the northwest outer rim of the larger crater Sarton. About two crater diameters to the northwest is the eroded Kramers.

This bowl-shaped crater has a nearly circular outer rim that remains well-defined and is only marginally damaged by subsequent impacts. One of these is a small, cup-shaped craterlet along the northwest rim. The common rim shared with Sarton is somewhat more irregular, with a pair of small craterlets at each end of the join. There is also a cluster of tiny craterlets on the exterior located to the south-southwest of Weber.

The inner wall of Weber retains some structure, but the features have become softened and rounded. There are shelf-like sections along the south-southeast and the northwestern inner walls. The interior floor is nearly level and featureless, being marked only by a tiny craterlet in the southeast quadrant.

Weber lies within the Coulomb-Sarton Basin, a 530 km wide impact crater of Pre-Nectarian age.
