= Edwin Brant Frost =

American astronomer (1866–1935)

Edwin Brant Frost II
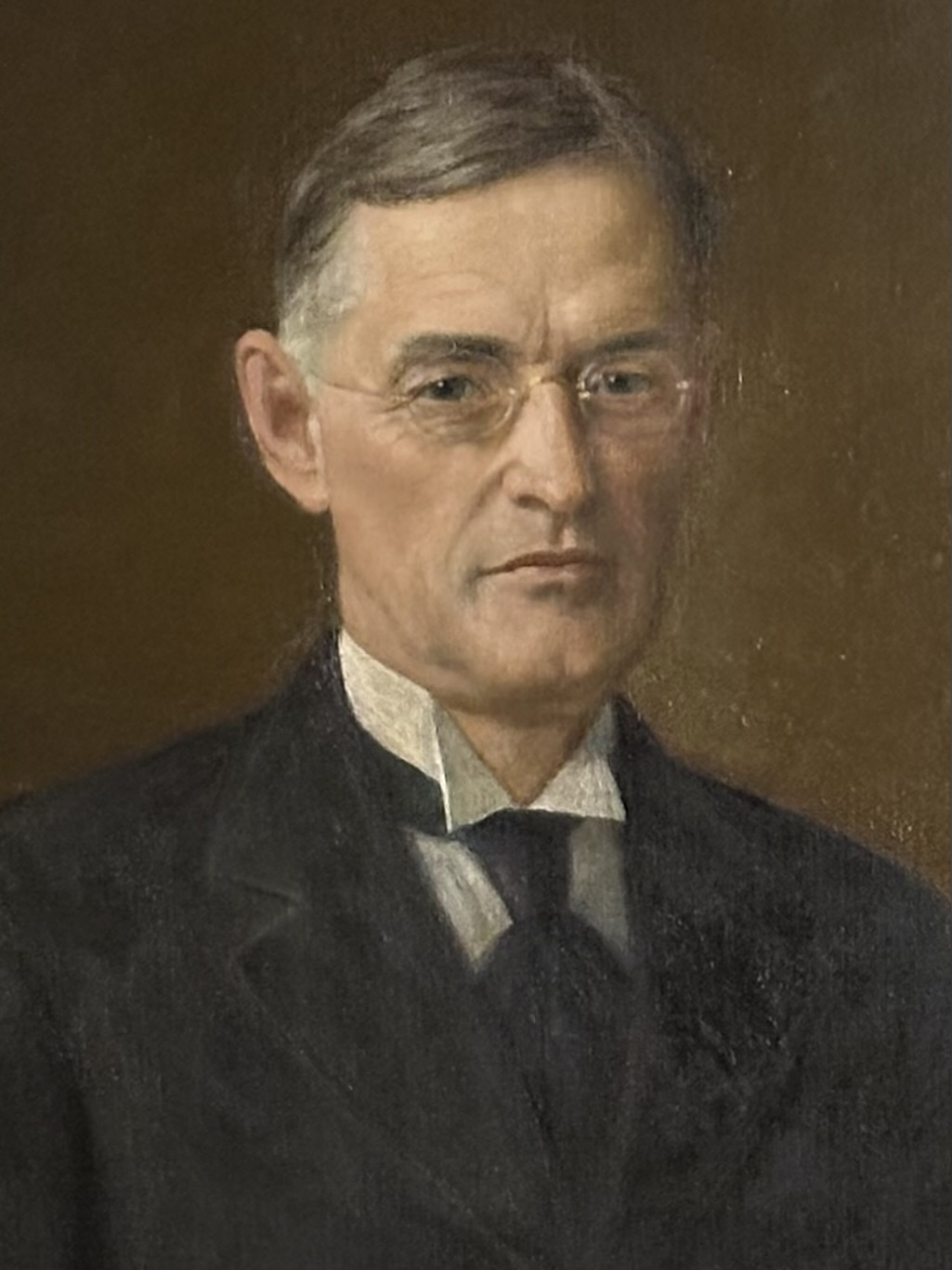
- Portrait of Edwin B Frost II at Yerkes Observatory
- Born: July 14, 1866; Brattleboro, Vermont
- Died: May 14, 1935 (aged 68); Chicago, Illinois
- Education: Dartmouth
- Scientific career
- Fields: astronomy

Edwin Brant Frost II (July 14, 1866 – May 14, 1935) was an American astronomer and longest serving Director of the Yerkes Observatory serving from 1905 to 1932.

== Biography ==
He was born in Brattleboro, Vermont. His father, Carlton Pennington Frost, was dean of Dartmouth Medical School.

Frost graduated from Dartmouth in 1886. He continued his education as a post-graduate student in chemistry and in 1887 became an instructor in physics while only 21 years old. In 1890 Frost went abroad to Europe and ended up researching stellar spectroscopy under Hermann Vogel in Potsdam. He returned to Dartmouth in 1892 as an assistant professor of astronomy.

He was fond of the outdoors and enjoyed golf, swimming, and ice skating. He also enjoyed music and literature. In 1896 he married Mary E. Hazard. They had three children, Katharine, Frederick, and Benjamin.

Frost joined the staff of Yerkes Observatory in 1898 and became its director in 1905 when George Hale resigned. Frost kept the position until his retirement in 1932. He also succeeded Hale as the editor of the Astrophysical Journal, from 1902 to 1932, and was known for his careful attention to details. In 1915 he lost the use of his right eye and in 1921, his left. Despite his blindness he continued working for eleven more years until his retirement in 1932.

Frost at the 1910 Fourth Conference International Union for Cooperation in Solar Research at Mount Wilson Observatory

Frost was elected to the United States National Academy of Sciences in 1908, the American Philosophical Society in 1909, and the American Academy of Arts and Sciences in 1913.

He died in 1935 in Chicago from peritonitis.

== Legacy ==
Frost's research focused on the determination of radial velocity using stellar spectroscopy and spectroscopic binaries. In 1902, he discovered the strange behavior of Beta Cephei, which later became the prototype for Beta Cephei variable stars.

He played a significant role in bringing Otto Struve to the United States, when the latter was living as an impoverished refugee in Turkey after the Russian Revolution. He later supported the appointment of Struve as his successor as director of Yerkes Observatory.

Asteroid 854 Frostia is named in his honor, as is the lunar crater Frost, on the far side of the Moon.
