= Charlier (lunar crater) =

Lunar impact crater

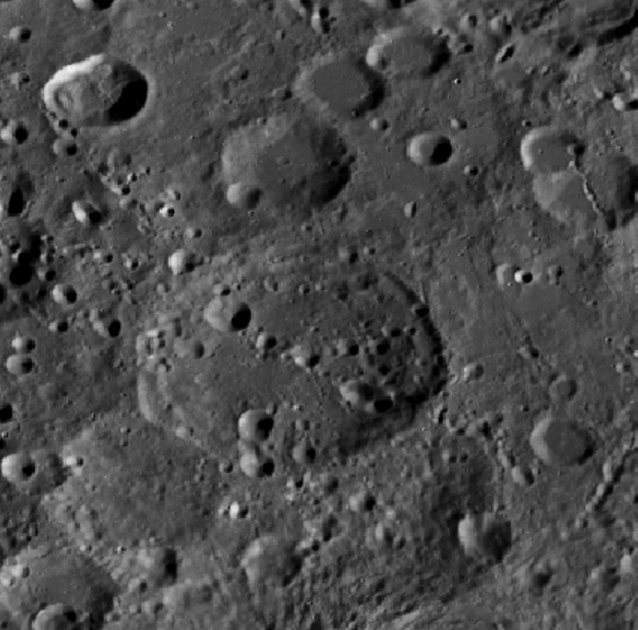
- LRO image of Charlier (center)
- Coordinates: 36.6°N 131.5°W
- Diameter: 109.88 km (68.28 mi)
- Depth: Unknown
- Colongitude: 133° at sunrise
- Formation: Pre-Nectarian
- Eponym: Carl Charlier

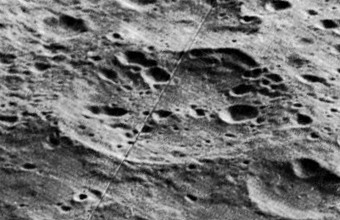
Another oblique view from Lunar Orbiter 5, facing west

Charlier is a lunar impact crater located on the far side of the Moon. It lies within the 374-km diameter Fowler-Charlier basin. To its south-southeast lies the larger crater Kovalevskaya, while Perrine is situated to the northeast.

This crater dates to the Pre-Nectarian period of the lunar geologic timescale. It exhibits significant erosion and a damaged outer rim. The most intact section lies in the northeast quadrant, while the southern and western rims are heavily worn and partially covered by smaller craters. The western rim, in particular, is overlaid by a merged cluster of several small impacts.

The crater's interior floor has been heavily marked by numerous impacts, with several small craters scattered across its surface, some overlapping earlier ones. However, two patches of the interior remain relatively undisturbed by notable impacts—one near the northern part of the floor and another in the southwestern region.

This crater is named after Swedish astronomer Carl Charlier (1862–1934). Its designation was formally adopted by the International Astronomical Union in 1970.

== Satellite craters ==
By convention these features are identified on lunar maps by placing the letter on the side of the crater midpoint that is closest to Charlier.

Charlier	Latitude	Longitude	Diameter
Z	39.7° N	131.6° W	46 km
