= Gullstrand (crater) =

Crater on the Moon

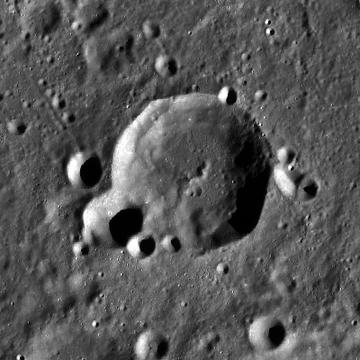
- LRO image
- Coordinates: 44.95°N 129.67°W
- Diameter: 45.05 km (27.99 mi)
- Depth: Unknown
- Colongitude: 130° at sunrise
- Eponym: Allvar Gullstrand

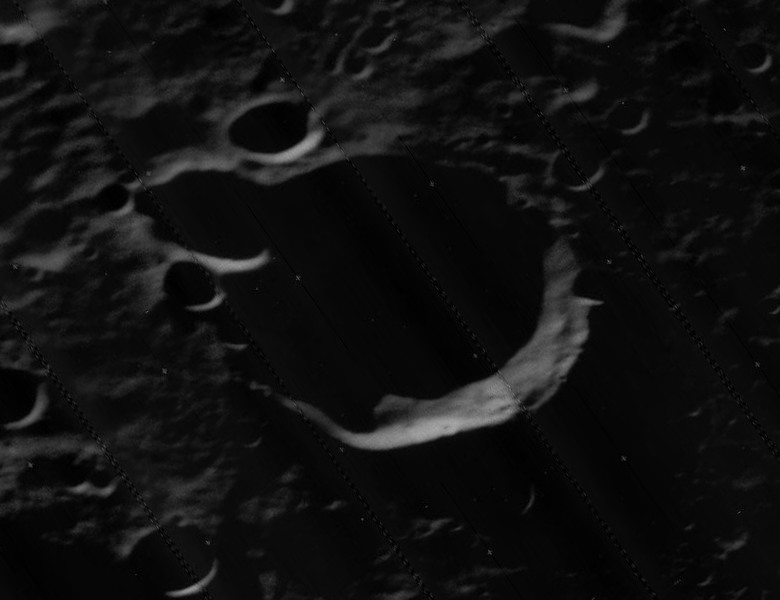
Oblique Lunar Orbiter 5 image

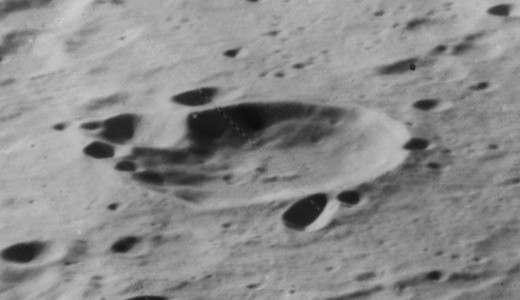
Highly oblique view facing west, also from Lunar Orbiter 5

Gullstrand is a lunar impact crater that lies on the northern hemisphere on the Moon's far side. About one crater diameter to the southeast is the larger crater Perrine. To the west-southwest is Quetelet.

This crater has a circular rim that is relatively well-defined, and has only been moderately worn. A small, bell-shaped crater forms a break through the rim to the southwest, and a small craterlet is attached to the southeastern side along the rim of Gullstrand. An oddly shaped small crater feature is attached to the eastern edge. There are also tiny craters along the rim of Gullstrand along the northern and southern edges.

The inner walls of Gullstrand are relatively simple and featureless, and the interior floor is not marked by any craters of note. There is a low central ridge at the midpoint.

The crater was formally named by the IAU in 1970 after Swedish ophthalmologist Allvar Gullstrand.

Gullstrand lies at the approximate margin of the Coulomb-Sarton Basin, a 530 km wide impact crater of Pre-Nectarian age.

== Satellite craters ==
By convention these features are identified on lunar maps by placing the letter on the side of the crater midpoint that is closest to Gullstrand.

Gullstrand	Latitude	Longitude	Diameter
C	46.8° N	126.6° W	15 km
