= Viscous damping =

Form of damping resulting from an object moving through a viscous fluid

In continuum mechanics, viscous damping is a formulation of the damping phenomena, in which the source of damping force is modeled as a function of the volume, shape, and velocity of an object traversing through a real fluid with viscosity.

Typical examples of viscous damping in mechanical systems include:

- Fluid films between surfaces
- Fluid flow around a piston in a cylinder
- Fluid flow through an orifice
- Fluid flow within a journal bearing

Viscous damping also refers to damping devices. Most often they damp motion by providing a force or torque opposing motion proportional to the velocity. This may be affected by fluid flow or motion of magnetic structures. The intended effect is to bring the damping ratio closer to 1.

Practical examples include:

- Shock absorbers in cars
- Seismic retrofitting with viscous dampers
- Deployment actuators in spacecraft

== Single-degree-of-freedom system ==
In a single-degree-of-freedom system, viscous damping models the relatitionship between force and velocity as shown below:

$f=c\dot x$

Where $c$ is the viscous damping coefficient with SI units of $N\cdot s/m$. This model adequately describes the damping force on a body that is moving at a moderate speed through a fluid. It is also the most common modeling choice for damping.

== See also ==
- Hysteresis
- Coulomb damping
