= Mervyn A. Ellison =

Irish astronomer

Mervyn Archdall Ellison FRAS FRSE (5 May 1909 – 12 September 1963) was an Irish astronomer. He was recognized as a world authority on solar physics and the effect of solar flares on the Earth.

== Life ==
He was born at Fethard-on-Sea in County Wexford, Ireland, the third son of Reverend William Frederick Archdall Ellison, and was home tutored until the age of nine when his father became the director of Armagh Observatory. Mervyn was entered into the Royal School, Armagh, and during his spare time, he developed an interest in astronomy. In 1927 he began his undergraduate work at Trinity College Dublin, where he studied physics and was elected a Scholar. On 9 November 1928 he was elected to the fellowship of the Royal Astronomical Society. He also served as president of the University Philosophical Society in 1931-32. In 1931–32 he worked on radium emanations for the Dublin hospitals under a Fitzgerald Research Scholarship. He was awarded a M.Sc. in 1932 and a Sc.D. in 1944.

Ellison became senior science master at Sherborne School in Dorset, 1933, then married Patricia Herron in 1934. The couple had two daughters and a son. On 29 May 1935 Ellison joined the British Astronomical Association. He also completed his own spectrohelioscope during this period, to study the Sun following the sunspot minimum. With the start of the world war, he organized an Air Cadet Training Corps, then joined the Operational Research Group at the Admiralty.

In 1946 he became a member of the International Astronomical Union. The following year, he joined the Royal Observatory, Edinburgh, where he continued studies of solar activity, including flares and prominences. In 1948 he was elected a Fellow of the Royal Society of Edinburgh. He remained at the observatory for eleven years and published multiple scientific papers on his work. He also was invited to lecture on astronomy, and gave radio and television interviews about solar activity. Mary Brück completed her PhD with him in 1950. For five years he was joint editor of The Observatory. He also played a leading role in the scientific work during the International Geophysical Year, serving as a solar reporter and working to erect a heliograph at the Royal Observatory, Cape of Good Hope.

Ellison published the book The Sun and its Influence in 1955. In 1958 he was appointed director of the Dunsink Observatory, and worked on several astronomical publications. He fell ill in 1963 and died. At the time of his death he was senior professor of Astronomy at the Dublin Institute for Advanced Studies.

Ellison crater on the Moon is named after him. (Note that the asteroid 10177 Ellison is not named after him, but rather the author Harlan Ellison.)

== Family ==
He married Patricia Elizabeth Goddard Herron in 1934.
