= Wegener (lunar crater) =

Lunar impact crater

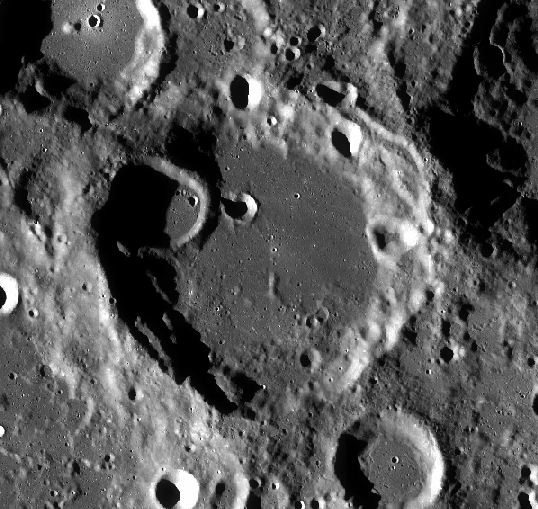
- LRO image
- Coordinates: 45.21°N 113.81°W
- Diameter: 95.78 km (59.51 mi)
- Depth: Unknown
- Colongitude: 115° at sunrise
- Eponym: Alfred L. Wegener

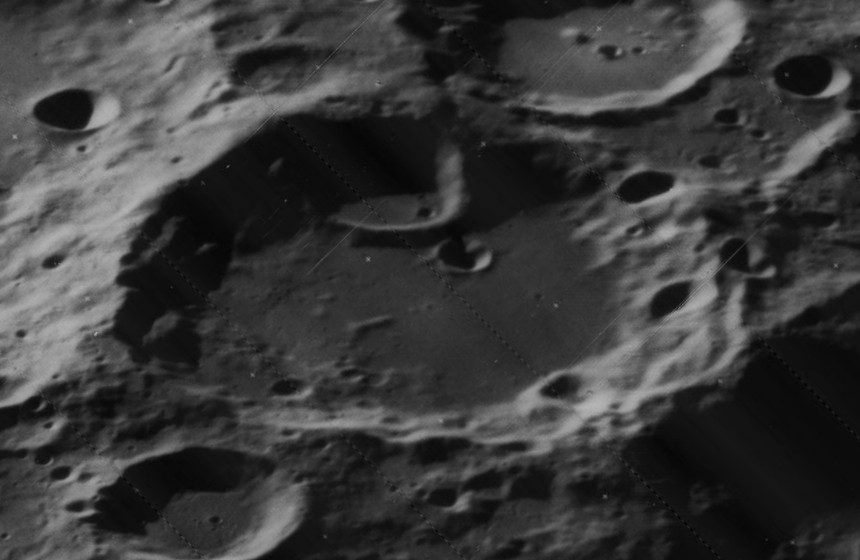
Oblique Lunar Orbiter 5 image, facing northwest

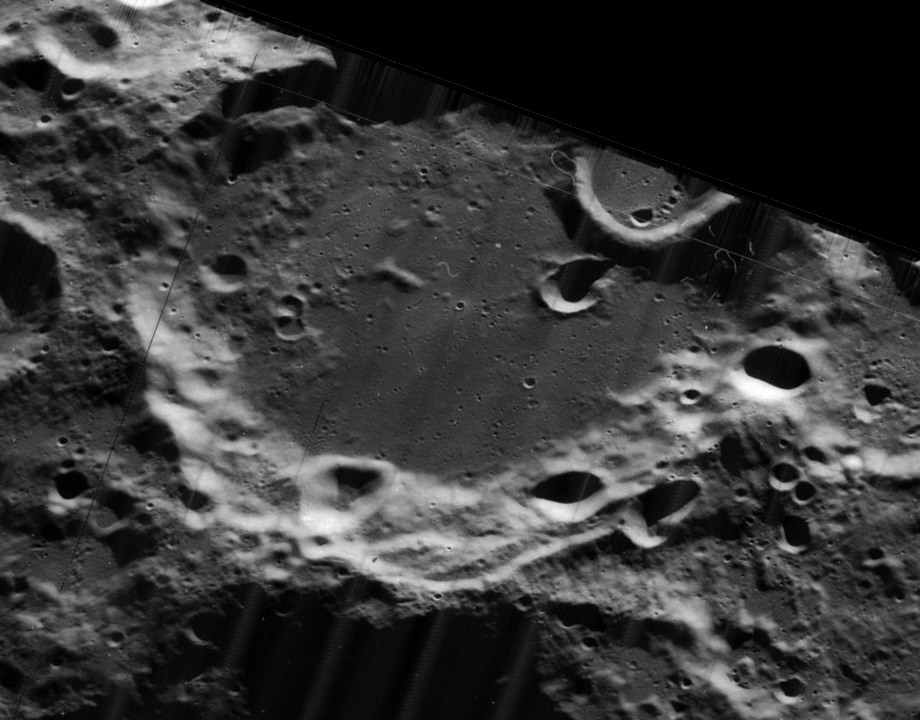
Another oblique Lunar Orbiter 5 image, facing west

Wegener is a lunar impact crater that is located in the Moon's northern hemisphere, about midway between the equator and the north pole. It lies on the far side from the Earth, behind the northwestern limb. The southwestern rim of Wegener intrudes slightly into the much larger walled plain named Landau. Attached to the eastern rim is the crater Stefan.

This crater is in an intermediate stage of impact erosion, with a worn rim and some craters overlapping the edge and inner wall. The rim is generally more eroded in the northern half. A small crater lies across the western inner wall and part of the interior floor. There is a small, cup-shaped craterlet just to the east of this feature. The inner wall is wider in the southern half, leaving some irregularities on the southern half of the floor. The remainder of the interior is a nearly level and featureless plain.

Wegener lies at the approximate margin of the Coulomb-Sarton Basin, a 530 km wide impact crater of Pre-Nectarian age.

The crater was named after the German geophysicist, polar researcher and meteorologist Alfred Wegener, originator of the theory of Plate tectonics. Prior to formal naming by the IAU in 1970, Wegener was called Crater 99.

== Satellite craters ==
By convention these features are identified on lunar maps by placing the letter on the side of the crater midpoint that is closest to Wegener.

Wegener	Latitude	Longitude	Diameter
K	43.3° N	111.9° W	32 km
W	47.5° N	116.1° W	54 km
