= A. E. Douglass =

American astronomer

- Born: July 5, 1867; Windsor, Vermont
- Died: March 20, 1962 (aged 94); Tucson, Arizona
- Education: Trinity College, Hartford, Connecticut
- Known for: Founding the discipline of dendrochronology Discovering a correlation between tree rings and the sunspot cycle
- Scientific career
- Fields: Astronomy; Dendrochronology
- Workplaces: University of Arizona; Lowell Observatory

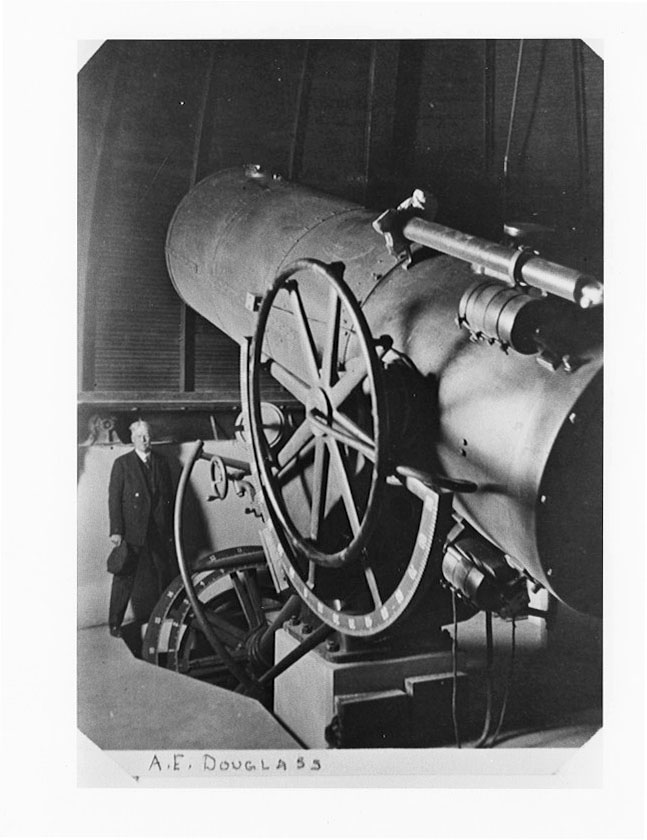
Prof. A.E. Douglass and the newly installed Steward Observatory 36-inch Telescope

A. E. (Andrew Ellicott) Douglass (July 5, 1867 in Windsor, Vermont – March 20, 1962 in Tucson, Arizona) was an American astronomer and archaeologist. He discovered a correlation between tree rings and the sunspot cycle, and founded the discipline of dendrochronology, which is a method of dating wood by analyzing the growth ring pattern. He started his discoveries in this field in 1894 when he was working at the Lowell Observatory. During this time he was an assistant to Percival Lowell, but fell out with him when his experiments made him doubt the existence of artificial "canals" on Mars and visible spokes on Venus.

Douglass was elected to the American Philosophical Society in 1941. Craters on the Moon and Mars are named in his honor.

== Founding of Steward Observatory ==
After a 5-year hiatus from astronomy, Douglass left Flagstaff, Arizona in 1906 and accepted a position as Assistant Professor of Physics and Geography at the University of Arizona in Tucson, Arizona. Almost immediately upon his arrival in Tucson, Douglass re-established his astronomical research programs using an 8-inch refracting telescope on loan from the Harvard College Observatory and actively began to pursue funding to construct a large research-class telescope in Tucson. Over the next 10 years Douglass was unable to secure funding from the university and the Arizona Territorial (and later State) Legislatures. During this period Douglass served the University of Arizona as Head of the Dept. of Physics and Astronomy, Interim President, and finally Dean of the College of Letters, Arts, & Sciences.

On October 18, 1916, University President Rufus B. von KleinSmid announced that an anonymous donor had given the university US$60,000 "... to be used to buy a telescope of huge size"; the donor was later revealed to be Mrs. Lavinia Steward of Oracle, Arizona, a wealthy widow with an interest in astronomy and a desire to commemorate her late husband, Henry Steward. Douglass made plans to use the Steward gift to construct a 36-inch Newtonian reflecting telescope. The Warner & Swayze Company of Cleveland, Ohio was contracted to build the telescope, but the United States entry into World War I delayed the contract since Warner & Swayze had war contracts that took priority. Until this time expertise in large telescope mirror making was in Europe, but the war made it impossible to contract with a European company, so Douglass had to find an American glass company willing to develop this expertise. After a couple of failed castings, the Spencer Lens Co. of Buffalo, New York produced the mirror for the Steward Telescope.

The telescope was finally installed in the observatory building in July 1922, and the Steward Observatory was officially dedicated on April 23, 1923. In his dedication address, Douglass recounted the trials and tribulations of establishing the observatory, then gave the following eloquent justification for the scientific endeavor:

This installation is to be devoted to scientific research. Scientific research is business foresight on a large scale. It is knowledge obtained before it is needed. Knowledge is power, but we cannot tell which fact in the domain of knowledge is the one which is going to give the power, and we therefore develop the idea of knowledge for its own sake, confident that some one fact or training will pay for all the effort. This I believe is the essence of education wherever such education is not strictly vocational. The student learns many facts and has much training. He can only dimly see which fact and which training will be of eminent use to him, but some special part of his education will take root in him and grow and pay for all of the effort which he and his friends have put into it. So it is with the research institutions. In this Observatory I sincerely hope and expect that the boundaries of human knowledge will be advanced along astronomical lines. Astronomy was the first science developed by our primitive ancestors thousands of years ago because it measured time. Performing that same function, it has played a vast part in human history, and today it is telling us facts, forever wonderful, about the size of our universe; perhaps tomorrow it will give us practical help in showing us how to predict climatic conditions in the future.

== Collaboration with the American Museum of Natural History ==
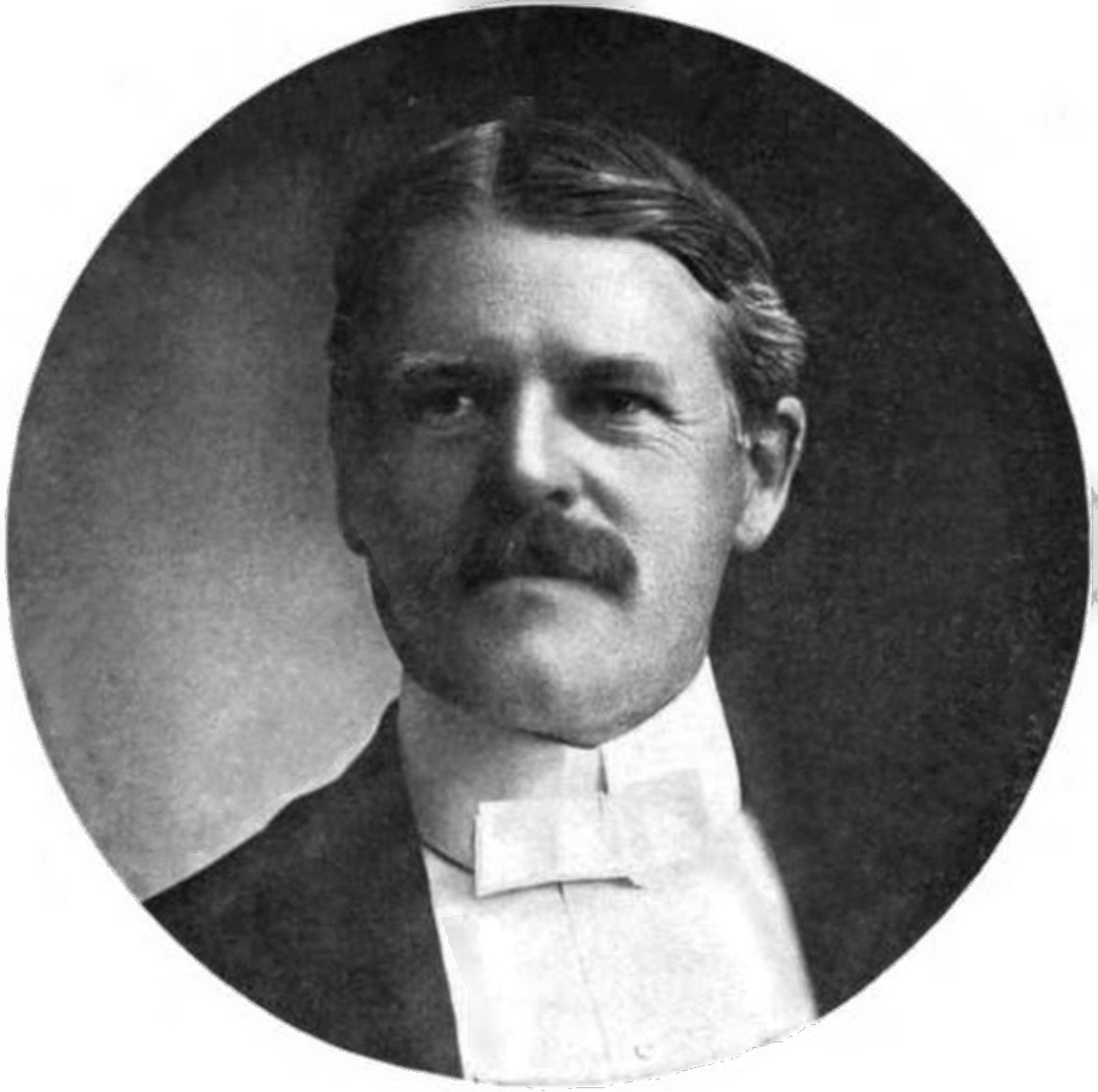
Douglass, ca. 1913

In 1909 Clark Wissler of the American Museum of Natural History organized the Archer M. Huntington Survey. One objective of this survey was to determine temporal arrangement of the American Southwest's prehistoric ruins. Wissler, who had read about Douglass's work concerning the relationship between precipitation and tree growth, later contacted Douglass saying:

Your work suggests to me a possible help in the archaeological investigation of the Southwest...We do not know how old these ruins are, but I should be glad to have an opinion from you as to whether it might be possible to connect up with your modern and dated trees specimens [with wood specimens] from these [prehistoric] ruins by correlating the curves of growth.

On June 19, 1914, the curator of the American Museum of Natural History wrote a letter to Douglass expressing his desire to begin archaeological analysis as early as possible.

In 1916 Douglass began obtaining and analyzing archaeological samples first collected during an expedition to northwest New Mexico by the University of Colorado and the American Museum of Natural History. In April 1918 Wissler asked Douglass whether or not it would be possible to assign relative dates to samples that could not be dated absolutely. Although this information would not associate particular sites with exact years, it would reveal whether or not ruins were constructed within the same time period. On May 22, 1919, Douglass informed Wissler that six specimens from Aztec Ruin, New Mexico were cut down within a two-year period, and estimated that samples from Pueblo Bonito in New Mexico were possibly 25 years older than those collected at Aztec Ruin. Upon receiving this news, Wissler was certain that Douglass would make a crucial contribution to archaeology. Douglass continued comparing samples between the two sites and concluded Pueblo Bonito actually predated Aztec Ruin by 40 to 45 years. These findings led to realization that relative dating could be used on many of the other ruins in the Southwest. Although promising steps had been made in solving the mystery of the ruins in the Southwest, in 1920 the American Museum of Natural History discontinued funding Douglass's research.

== Beam Expeditions with the National Geographic Society ==
On January 22, 1922, Douglass was informed that the National Geographic Society could be a potential source of funding. By May of that year the idea of a Beam Expedition funded by the National Geographic Society was conceived (Nash 1999: 30–31), and expeditions took place in 1923 and 1928. They produced a floating chronology of 585 years for Southwestern ruins, and extended Douglass's Flagstaff chronology of Ponderosa Pine, which was 500 years long in 1914, to 1260. However, these expeditions failed to bridge the gap that existed between these two chronologies.

== Discovery of HH-39 ==
In 1929 Douglass set out on a third Beam Expedition, explicitly targeting samples that would potentially bridge the gap between the two chronologies. Finally, on June 22, 1929, a beam labeled HH-39 was extracted at the Show Low site in Arizona. This beam took the Flagstaff chronology back to 1237. Later that day, the inner rings of HH-39 were successfully cross-dated against the outer rings of Douglass's floating chronology. Over 15 years after he began working with Clark Wissler, Douglass had bridged the gap and, as a result, had a continuous record of tree-ring data dating back to 700. For the first time in history, dates could be assigned to Southwestern ruins with certainty. Cliff dwelling at Tsegi Canyon, Mesa Verde, and Canyon de Chelly dated back to the 13th century. It was determined that Aztec Ruin was constructed during a period ranging from 1111 to 1120. Pueblo Bonito was found to be built in the latter portion of the 11th century.

== Publication ==
Douglass formally reported his findings in the December 1929 issue of National Geographic. He wrote:

Its inner rings overlapped the late decades of the old chronology by 49 years, the final ring resting on the year 537 of that sequence; its outer ones overlapped the earliest 120 years of the new, the last one reaching to 1380. Thus the 26 years from 1260 to 1286, which belonged to both chronologies, were definitely matched and their union confirmed by HH-39, which in American archaeology is destined to hold a place comparable to Egypt's Rosetta Stone...With careful archaeological study we shall perhaps be able to trace the movement of clans and test tribal traditions which have been so often quoted as the early history of these people.

== Formalization of dendrochronology ==
Douglass returned to the University of Arizona where he became the first person to formally teach classes in dendrochronology. In 1937 Douglass established the Laboratory of Tree-Ring Research at the University of Arizona. The A.E. Douglass papers are held at the University of Arizona Special Collections Library.

== Applications of dendrochronology ==
Since Douglass's discovery in the US Southwest, his dendroarchaeological techniques have been used to date structures around the world. Tree rings are used to reconstruct events including fire regimes, volcanic activity, hurricane activity, glacial movement, precipitation, mass movements, and hydrology, helping to analyze the past and predict future trends.

His research led him to the Hopi villages in Arizona. The village of Oraibi had been occupied since before the coming of white men in 1540. He wanted to study the logs used in buildings. The Hopis were not necessarily excited about the intrusion.

Native Americans were famous for accepting gifts from white men in exchange for favors or gifts. Dr. Douglass, being aware of this tendency, presented the chief with many yards of purple chiffon velvet fabric. The chief was further pacified when Dr. Douglass' team placed pieces of turquoise in holes that were drilled into the logs to extract cores of wood. This turquoise would "appease the spirit of decay." This trade led to the discovery of one section of timber which revealed a very clear series of rings covering a period from 1260 to 1344. It had been in Hopi use from the time it was cut till the village was abandoned in 1906.

== Selected works ==
Douglass, A.E.

- (1944) "Tabulation of Dates for Bluff Ruin" Tree-Ring Bulletin Vol. 9, No. 2
- (1941) "Age of Forestdale Ruins Excavated in 1939" Tree-Ring Bulletin Vol. 8, No. 2
- (1940) "Tree-Ring Dates from the Forestdale Valley, East-Central Arizona" Tree-Ring Bulletin Vol. 7, No. 2
- (1921) "Dating Our Prehistoric Ruins: How Growth Rings in Timbers Aid in Establishing the Relative Ages in Ruined Pueblos of the Southwest" Natural History Vol. 21, No. 2

== See also ==
- Jack Eddy
