= Frost (crater) =

Lunar impact crater on the far side of the Moon

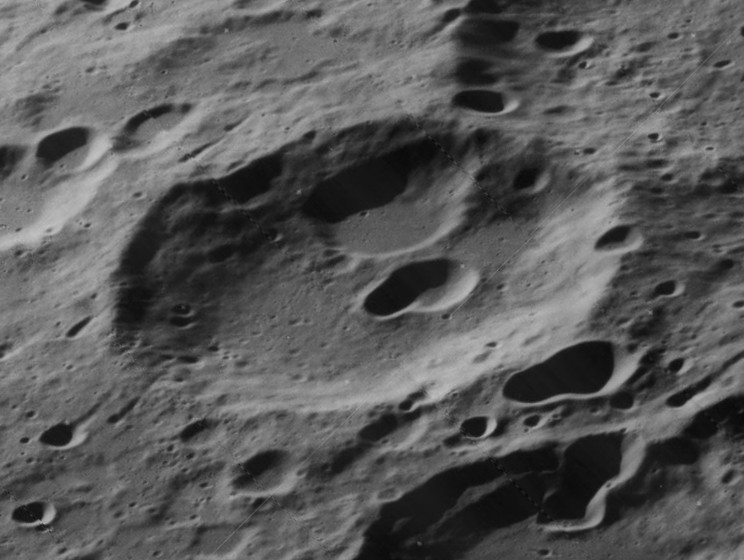
- Oblique Lunar Orbiter 5 image, facing west
- Coordinates: 37.41°N 118.90°W
- Diameter: 78.30 km (48.65 mi)
- Depth: Unknown
- Colongitude: 120° at sunrise
- Eponym: Edwin B. Frost

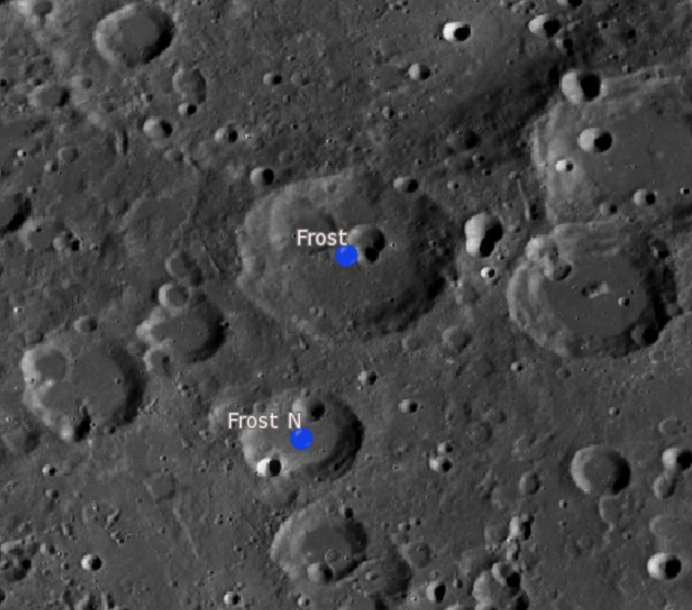
Satellite feature and surroundings

Frost is a lunar impact crater that is attached to the southern rim Landau, a walled plain on the far side of the Moon. Just to the east is Petropavlovskiy, and to the northeast along the edge of Landau is Razumov. The crater Douglass is located less than a crater diameter to the west-southwest.

The outer rim of Frost is degraded and is overlaid by a small craterlet along the northeast side. The inner wall is wider and heavier along the northern side where it has been reinforced by the former rim of Landau. The northern part of the interior floor is occupied by two smaller craters, with the larger of the two along the northwest inner wall. The southern part of the floor is relatively level and featureless.

This formation is named after American astronomer Edwin Brant Frost (1866-1935). Its designation was formally adopted by the International Astronomical Union in 1970. Previously, Frost was identified as Crater 166.

== Satellite craters ==
By convention this feature is identified on lunar maps by placing the letter on the side of the crater midpoint that is closest to Frost.

Frost	Latitude	Longitude	Diameter
N	35.0° N	119.2° W	43 km
