= Sarton (crater) =

Crater on the Moon

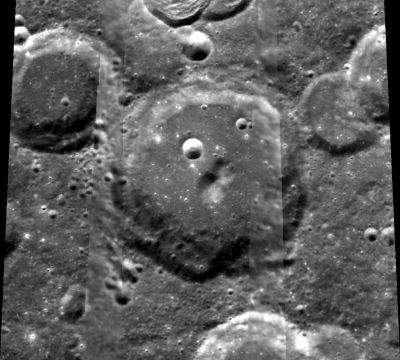
- Clementine mosaic
- Coordinates: 49.3°N 121.1°W
- Diameter: 69 km
- Depth: Unknown
- Colongitude: 122° at sunrise
- Eponym: George A. L. Sarton

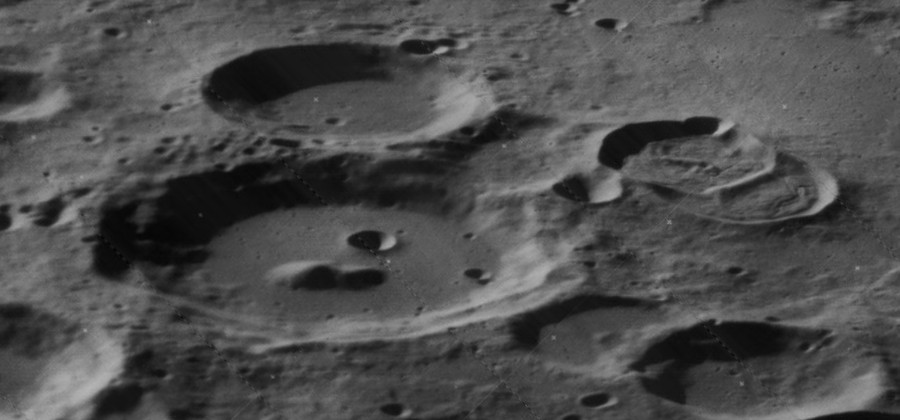
Oblique Lunar Orbiter 5 image, with Sarton in lower left and Weber in upper left, and Sarton Y and Z at right, facing west

Sarton is a lunar impact crater that lies beyond the northwestern limb of the Moon, on the far side from the Earth. It is located to the southwest of the crater Coulomb, to the north of a walled plain named Landau. Nearly attached to the northwestern rim is the smaller Weber.

Although roughly circular, this is a somewhat oddly shaped crater that is slightly elongated to the south. The western and eastern outer rims are slightly straightened, giving the crater a slightly hexagonal form. The inner wall is wider along the southern and southeastern sides than in the north. The crater is worn and its features have lost some definition. The interior floor is nearly level, with the exception of a double-peaked central rise. To the northwest of this ridge is a small, cup-shaped crater.

Sarton lies within the Coulomb-Sarton Basin, a 530 km wide impact crater of Pre-Nectarian age. The craters Sarton Y and Sarton Z are closest to the center of the basin.

== Satellite craters ==
By convention these features are identified on lunar maps by placing the letter on the side of the crater midpoint that is closest to Sarton.

Sarton	Latitude	Longitude	Diameter
L	47.0° N	120.0° W	48 km
Y	51.5° N	121.3° W	26 km
Z	51.6° N	120.6° W	29 km

Sarton Y and Z are the only craters with fractued floors in the immediate vicinity. This may be related to their position in the topographical low in the center of the Coulomb-Sarton basin.
