= Charles Coulombe =

Charles Coulombe may refer to:

- Charles A. Coulombe (born 1960), American Catholic author and lecturer
- Charles Jérémie Coulombe (1846–1937), physician and political figure in Quebec

== See also ==
- Charles-Augustin de Coulomb (1736–1806), French physicist
