= Stefan (crater) =

Crater on the Moon

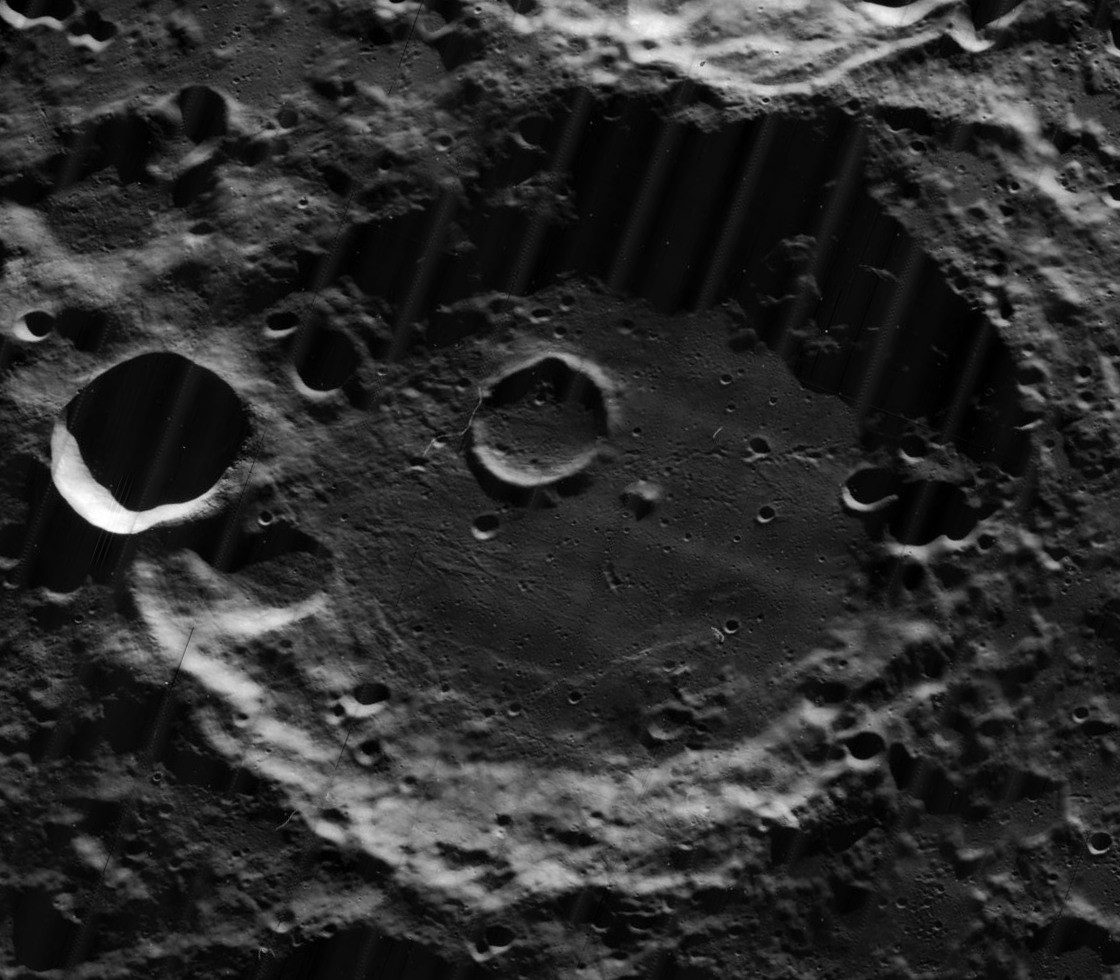
- Oblique Lunar Orbiter 5 image, facing west
- Coordinates: 46.33°N 108.77°W
- Diameter: 112.18 km (69.71 mi)
- Depth: Unknown
- Colongitude: 110° at sunrise
- Eponym: Joseph Stefan

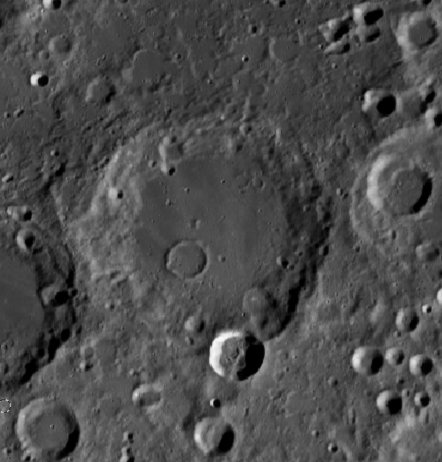
LRO mosaic

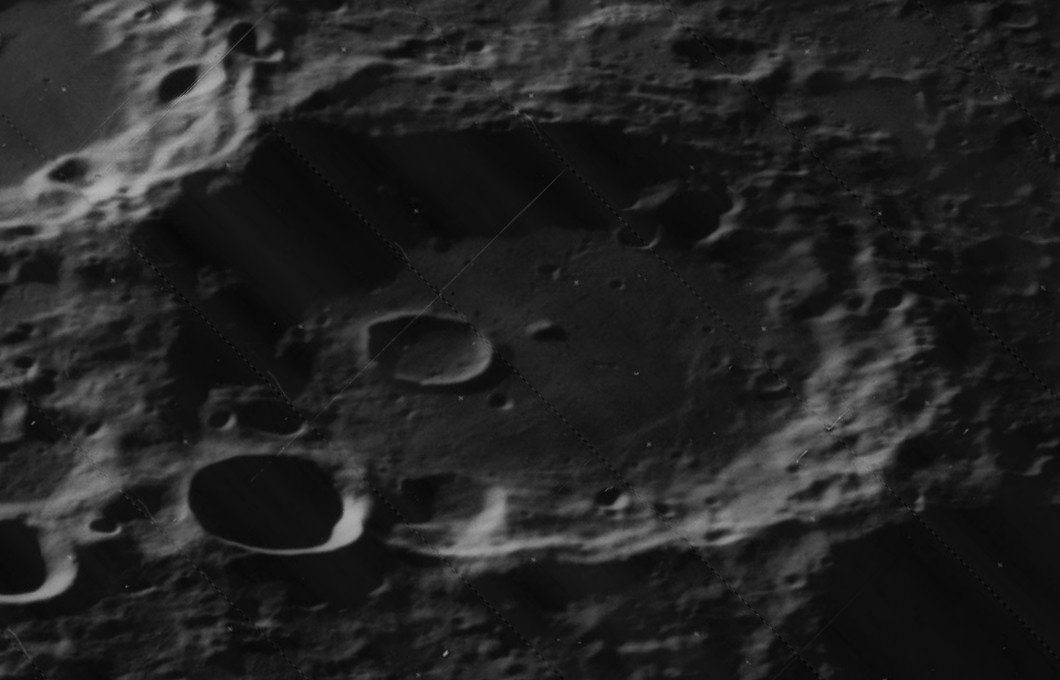
Another oblique Lunar Orbiter 5 image, facing northwest

Stefan is a lunar impact crater on the far side of the Moon, just beyond the northwestern limb. Attached to the western rim is the slightly smaller crater Wegener, and close to the eastern rim is Rynin.

As with many craters of this size on the Moon, the outer rim has been worn by impact erosion and the edge and inner wall are generally pitted with small craterlets. The southern edge of the rim in particular has been damaged by impacts, and is overlain by the satellite crater Stefan L. This bowl-shaped crater lies at the center of a small ray system, which is indicative of a relatively young impact.

The interior floor of Stefan is a generally level surface that is marked by several impacts. The most notable is a ring-shaped crater rim projecting up through the southern half of the floor. Near the midpoint is a low hill, possibly the buried remnant of a central peak.

Prior to formal naming by the IAU in 1970, Stefan was called Crater 100.

Stefan lies at the approximate margin of the Coulomb-Sarton Basin, a 530 km wide impact crater of Pre-Nectarian age.

== Satellite craters ==
By convention these features are identified on lunar maps by placing the letter on the side of the crater midpoint that is closest to Stefan.

Stefan	Latitude	Longitude	Diameter
L	44.6° N	107.7° W	26 km
