= Coulomb damping =

Damping mechanism in which kinetic energy is dissipated by sliding friction

Coulomb damping is a type of constant mechanical damping in which the system's kinetic energy is absorbed via sliding friction (the friction generated by the relative motion of two surfaces that press against each other). Coulomb damping is a common damping mechanism that occurs in machinery.

== History ==
Coulomb damping was so named because Charles-Augustin de Coulomb carried on research in mechanics. He later published a work on friction in 1781 entitled "Theory of Simple Machines" for an Academy of Sciences contest. Coulomb then gained much fame for his work with electricity and magnetism.

== Modes of Coulombian friction ==
Coulomb damping absorbs energy with friction, which converts that kinetic energy into thermal energy, i.e. heat. Coulomb friction considers this under two distinct modes: either static, or kinetic.

Static friction occurs when two objects are not in relative motion, e.g. if both are stationary. The force F_{s} exerted between the objects does exceed—in magnitude—the product of the normal force N and the coefficient of static friction μ_{s}:

$$|F_\text{s}| < \mu_\text{s} N.$$

Kinetic friction on the other hand, occurs when two objects are undergoing relative motion, as they slide against each other. The force F_{k} exerted between the moving objects is equal in magnitude to the product of the normal force N and the coefficient of kinetic friction μ_{k}:

$$\left|F_\text{k}\right| = \mu_\text{k} N.$$

Regardless of the mode, friction always acts to oppose the objects' relative motion. The normal force is taken perpendicularly to the direction of relative motion; under the influence of gravity, and in the common case of an object supported by a horizontal surface, the normal force is just the weight of the object itself.

As there is no relative motion under static friction, no work is done, and hence no energy can be dissipated. An oscillating system is (by definition) only dampened via kinetic friction.

== Illustration ==
Consider a block of mass $m$ that slides over a rough horizontal surface under the restraint of a spring with a spring constant $k$. The spring is attached to the block and mounted to an immobile object on the other end allowing the block to be moved by the force of the spring

$$F = k x,$$

where $x$ is the horizontal displacement of the block from when the spring is unstretched. On a horizontal surface, the normal force is constant and equal to the weight of the block by Newton's third law, i.e.

$$N = mg.$$

As stated earlier, $F_\text{k}$ acts to opposite the motion of the block. Once in motion, the block will oscillate horizontally back and forth around the equilibrium. Newton's second law states that the equation of motion of the block is

$$m \ddot x \ = -F - (\sgn{\dot x}) F_k = -k x - (\sgn{\dot x}) \mu_\text{k}mg.$$

Above, $\dot x$ and $\ddot x$ respectively denote the velocity and acceleration of the block. Note that the sign of the kinetic friction term depends on $\sgn{\dot x}$—the direction the block is travelling in—but not the speed.

A real-life example of Coulomb damping occurs in large structures with non-welded joints such as airplane wings.

== Theory ==
Coulomb damping dissipates energy constantly because of sliding friction. The magnitude of sliding friction is a constant value; independent of surface area, displacement or position, and velocity. The system undergoing Coulomb damping is periodic or oscillating and restrained by the sliding friction. Essentially, the object in the system is vibrating back and forth around an equilibrium point. A system being acted upon by Coulomb damping is nonlinear because the frictional force always opposes the direction of motion of the system as stated earlier. And because there is friction present, the amplitude of the motion decreases or decays with time. Under the influence of Coulomb damping, the amplitude decays linearly with a slope of$\pm 2\mu mg\omega_\text{n}/(k\pi)$ where ω_{n} is the natural frequency. The natural frequency is the number of times the system oscillates between a fixed time interval in an undamped system. It should also be known that the frequency and the period of vibration do not change when the damping is constant, as in the case of Coulomb damping. The period τ is the amount of time between the repetition of phases during vibration. As time progresses, the object sliding slows and the distance it travels during these oscillations becomes smaller until it reaches zero, the equilibrium point. The position where the object stops, or its equilibrium position, could potentially be at a completely different position than when initially at rest because the system is nonlinear. Linear systems have only a single equilibrium point.

== See also ==
- Friction § Dry friction
- Viscous damping
