= Coulombs =

Coulombs (symbol: C) usually refers to the plural of the SI unit for electric charge

Coulombs may also refer to:

- Coulombs, Calvados, a commune in Basse-Normandie, France
- Coulombs, Eure-et-Loir, a commune in central France
- Coulombs-en-Valois, a commune in the Seine-et-Marne département, France

== See also ==
- Coulomb (disambiguation)
