= Coulomb Affair =

Conflict between Emma and Alexis Coulomb

The Coulomb Affair was a conflict between Emma and Alexis Coulomb, on one side, and Helena Blavatsky and the Theosophical Society, on the other.

Blavatsky met Emma and Alexis in 1871 in Cairo. They founded the short-lived Société Spirite. In August 1879, Emma and Alexis contacted Blavatsky because they had financial problems. They were stranded in Sri Lanka, and Blavatsky helped them to get to Bombay and tried to find a job for them. As she could not find a job for them, she provided them with a position in the Theosophical Society, where they did various chores, such as cooking and gardening. In February 1884, Blavatsky and H. S. Olcott travelled to Europe. After their departure, a conflict between the Coulombs and the Theosophical Society escalated. The Coulombs tried to blackmail and threaten Blavatsky, whereupon Blavatsky dismissed them. When the theosophists inspected Blavatsky's room after the Coulombs had to leave, they found secret doors in her room. Alexis claimed that he constructed these secret doors for Blavatsky. Theosophists have said that Alexis' constructions were obviously newly built, and the secret doors could not be opened or closed silently or without strong effort.

After the Coulombs were dismissed, they went to their Christian missionary friends of the Free Church of Scotland, and gave them letters that were allegedly written by Blavatsky to Emma. These letters suggested that Blavatsky was a fraud. The chaplain George Patterson published extracts from these letters in the Madras Christian College Magazine. The incident became well known all over India and also in America and Europe. Blavatsky immediately published a reply in several newspapers. Blavatsky and Olcott then travelled back to India at the end of 1884. Soon afterwards the Hodgson Report was published, which further damaged Blavatsky's reputation. The report also contained the allegations of the Coulombs.

In 1986 and 1997, Vernon Harrison of the Society for Psychical Research published a study on the Hodgson Report. The Blavatsky–Coulomb letters were destroyed by Elliott Coues, an enemy of Blavatsky, so that they cannot be studied.

== See also ==
- Hodgson Report
- Incidents in the Life of Madame Blavatsky

== Literature ==
- Besant, Annie: H. P. Blavatsky und die Meister der Weisheit. Theosophisches Verlagshaus, Leipzig 1924
- Coulomb, Emma: Some account of my association with Madame Blavatsky from 1872 to 1884. Lawrence Asylum Press, Madras 1884
- Harrison, Vernon: H. P. Blavatsky und die SPR, Eine Untersuchung des Hodgson Berichtes aus dem Jahre 1885. Theosophischer Verlag 1998; ISBN 3-930623-21-8
- Hartmann, Franz: Wahrheit und Dichtung, Die Theosophische Gesellschaft und der Wunderschrank von Adyar. o.O. 1906
