= Coulomb-Sarton Basin =

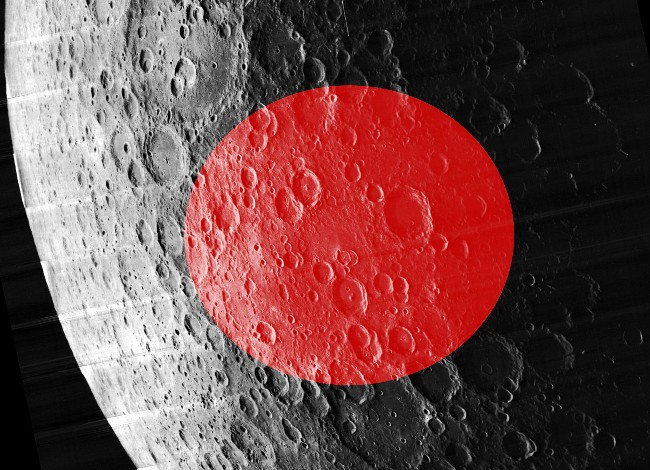
- Oblique Lunar Orbiter 5 image, with the approximate extent of the basin highlighted in red
- Coordinates: 52.0°N 123.0°W
- Diameter: 530 km
- Eponym: Coulomb and Sarton craters

The Coulomb-Sarton Basin is a Pre-Nectarian impact basin on the far side of the Moon. It is named after the crater Coulomb northeast of the center of the basin and the smaller crater Sarton just south of the center. The basin is not obvious on the lunar surface. There are only small fragments of inner rings and a rim, and the most indicative topographic feature is a smooth, low plain at the center. The basin was identified by Hartman and Wood in 1971.

At the center is a mass concentration (mascon), or gravitational high. The mascon was first identified by Doppler tracking of the Lunar Prospector spacecraft. The existence of the basin was confirmed by the GRAIL spacecraft.

Other craters within the basin include Weber and Kramers. At the approximate margin of the basin are Dyson, Ellison, Stefan, Wegener, Wood, Landau, and Gullstrand. The large crater Birkhoff is to the northwest.

The basin is older than many other large basins including Orientale, Imbrium, Hertzsprung, Birkhoff, and Lorentz.

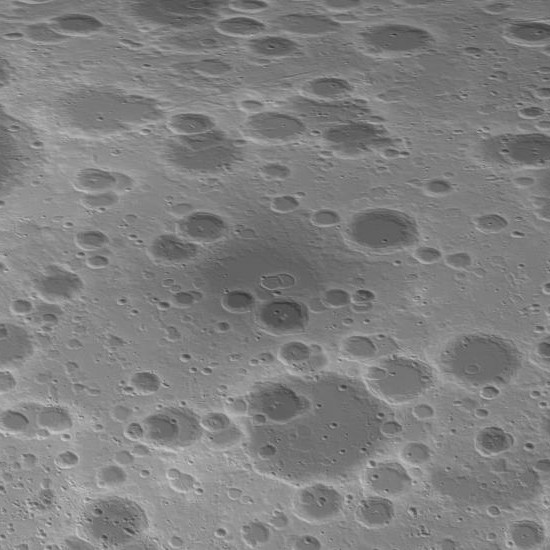
Topographic map

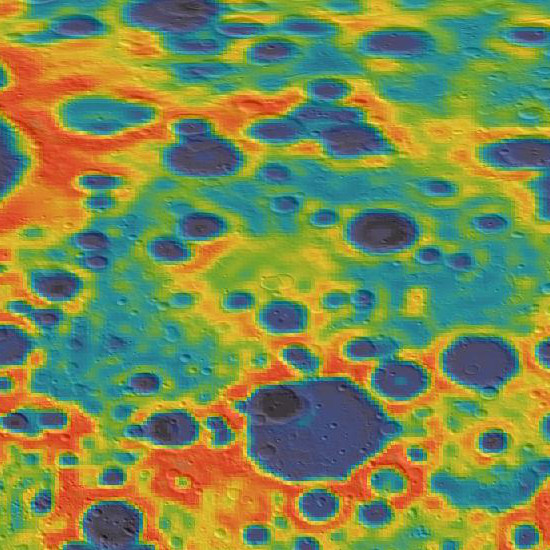
Gravity map based on GRAIL
