= Screened Coulomb potentials implicit solvent model =

Continuum solvent model for biomolecular simulations

SCP-ISM, or screened Coulomb potentials implicit solvent model, is a continuum approximation of solvent effects for use in computer simulations of biological macromolecules, such as proteins and nucleic acids, usually within the framework of molecular dynamics. It is based on the classic theory of polar liquids, as developed by Peter Debye and corrected by Lars Onsager to incorporate reaction field effects. The model can be combined with quantum chemical calculations to formally derive a continuum model of solvent effects suitable for computer simulations of small and large molecular systems. The model is included in the CHARMM molecular mechanics code.
