= Coulomb (crater) =

Lunar impact crater

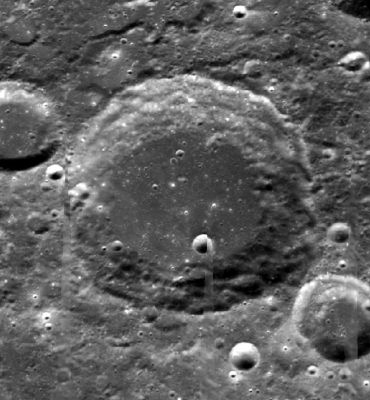
- Clementine mosaic
- Coordinates: 54.46°N 115.00°W
- Diameter: 89.72 km (55.75 mi)
- Depth: Unknown
- Colongitude: 116° at sunrise
- Formation: Late Imbrian
- Eponym: Charles A. Coulomb

Coulomb is a lunar impact crater that lies behind the northwestern limb, on the far side of the Moon. It is located to the west-southwest of the large crater Poczobutt, and northeast of Sarton. Coulomb lies within the Coulomb-Sarton Basin, a 530 km wide impact crater of Pre-Nectarian age.

This formation dates to the Late Imbrian period on the lunar geologic timescale. The rim of this crater is mildly eroded, but still retains a well-defined edge and displays some old terracing on the wide inner walls. Within the sloping inner walls, the crater floor is remarkably level and nearly featureless, at least in comparison to the more rugged terrain that surrounds the crater. Only a few tiny craterlets mark this interior plain, and a small crater near the south-southeast inner wall.

The exterior of the crater retains something of an outer rampart, extending for about a third of crater diameter. The satellite crater Coulomb V lies just beyond the west-northwest limb, while on the opposite side Coulomb J lies a short distance from the outer rim, forming a nearly symmetric pattern. The inner walls of the crater have only a few small impacts along the sides, with one near each of the aforementioned satellite craters.

This crater is named after French physicist Charles A. Coulomb (1736–1806). Its designation was formally adopted by the International Astronomical Union in 1970.

== Satellite craters ==
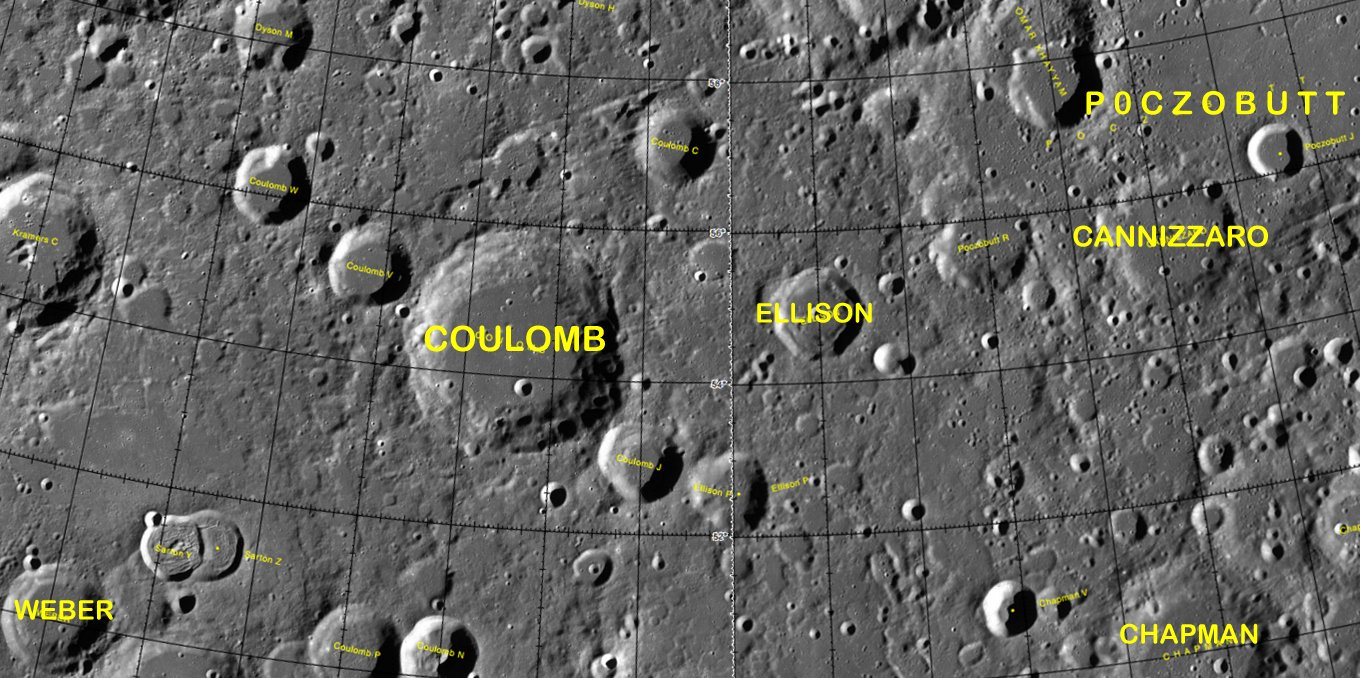
Vicinity of Coulomb showing satellite formations

By convention these features are identified on lunar maps by placing the letter on the side of the crater midpoint that is closest to Coulomb.

| Coulomb | Latitude | Longitude | Diameter |
|---|---|---|---|
| C | 57.4° N | 110.8° W | 34 km |
| J | 53.1° N | 111.6° W | 35 km |
| N | 50.6° N | 115.8° W | 32 km |
| P | 50.5° N | 117.4° W | 38 km |
| V | 55.6° N | 118.1° W | 36 km |
| W | 56.5° N | 120.4° W | 34 km |
