= Landau (crater) =

Crater on the Moon

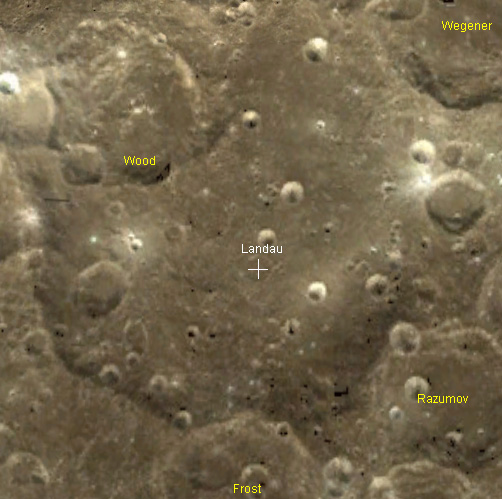
- Landau from orbit.
- Coordinates: 42.16°N 119.34°W
- Diameter: 218.15 km (135.55 mi)
- Depth: 4.15 km (2.58 mi)
- Colongitude: 121° at sunrise
- Formation: Pre-Nectarian
- Eponym: Lev D. Landau

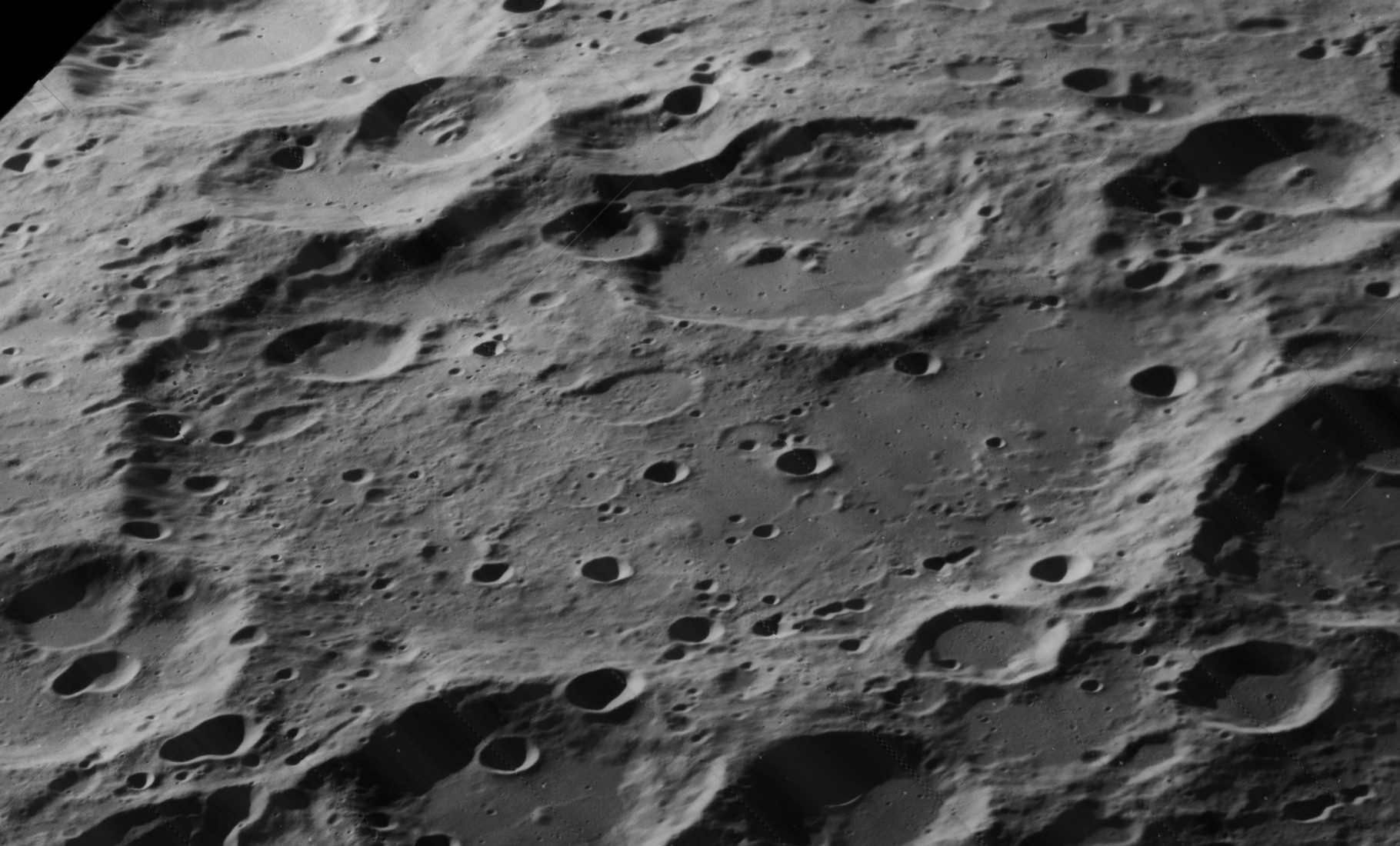
Oblique Lunar Orbiter 5 image, facing west

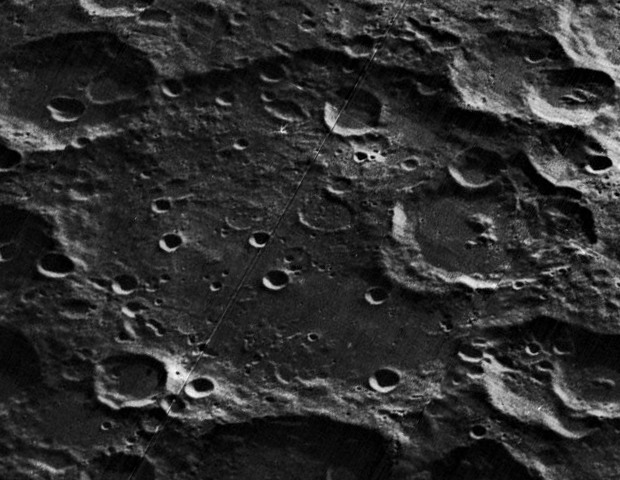
Another oblique view from Lunar Orbiter 5, facing southwest

Landau is a large lunar impact crater that is located in the northern hemisphere on the far side of the Moon. It was named after physicist Lev Landau. The crater Wegener is attached to the northeastern rim. Attached to the southeastern rim is Frost. Landau lies at the approximate margin of the Coulomb-Sarton Basin, a 530 km wide impact crater of Pre-Nectarian age.

This formation dates to the Pre-Nectarian period of the lunar geologic timescale. The outer rim of Landau is heavily eroded and modified by subsequent impacts. The most notable of these is Wood, which overlays the northwest rim.

Much of the floor is hilly and irregular, with only the northeast quadrant being somewhat level. There are multiple small craters and craterlets in the floor. The most intact section of the rim is in the southwest, although this is now little more than a low ridge line. The infrared spectrum of pure crystalline plagioclase has been identified on the southeast and central floor, plus the east rim.

Prior to formal naming by the IAU in 1970, Landau was called Crater 97.

== Satellite craters ==
By convention these features are identified on lunar maps by placing the letter on the side of the crater midpoint that is closest to Landau.

Landau	Latitude	Longitude	Diameter
Q	41.0° N	121.7° W	32 km
