= Yutu-2 =

Chinese lunar rover

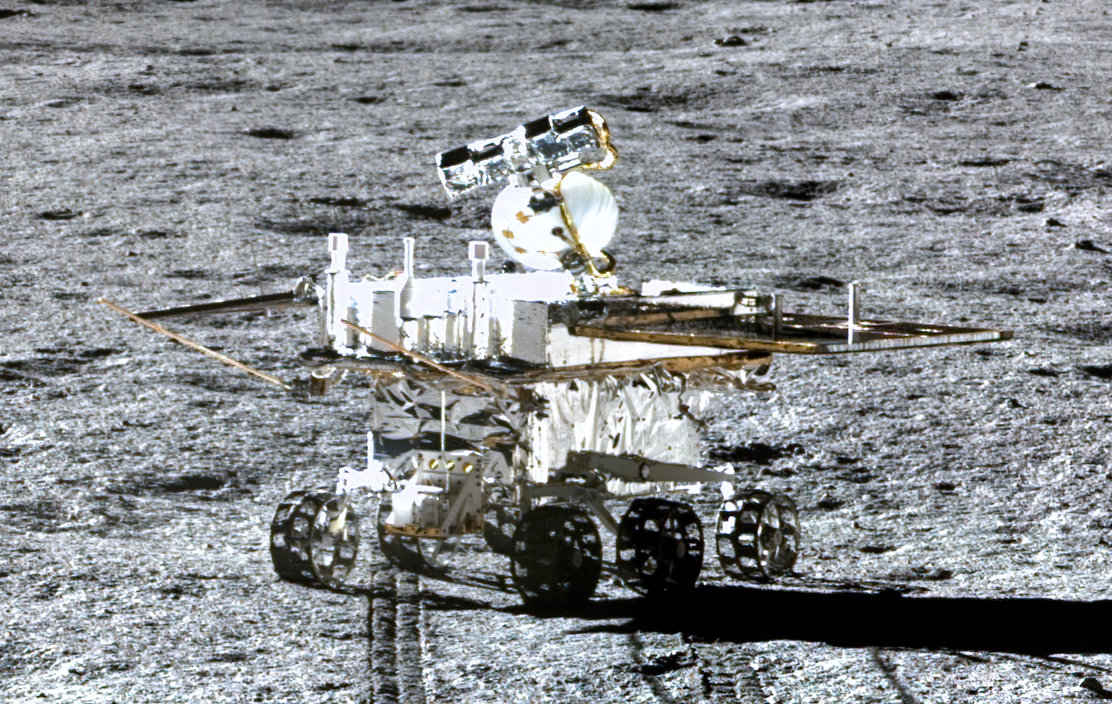
- Yutu-2 rover on the Moon as seen by the Chang'e 4 lander
- Mission type: lunar rover
- Operator: CNSA
- Mission duration: 3 months (planned); Current: 2844 days

Spacecraft properties
- Launch mass: Rover: 140 kg
- Landing mass: 140 kg
- Dimensions: 1.5 × 1.0 × 1.0 m

Start of mission
- Launch date: 7 December 2018, 18:23 UTC
- Rocket: Long March 3B
- Launch site: Xichang Satellite Launch Center

Lunar rover
- Landing date: 3 January 2019, 02:26 UTC
- Landing site: Von Kármán crater in the South Pole-Aitken Basin
- Distance driven: 1.613 km (1.002 mi) as of 19 September 2024

Yutu-2 (Chinese: 玉兔二号; pinyin: Yùtù Èrhào) is the robotic lunar rover component of CNSA's Chang'e 4 mission to the Moon, launched on 7 December 2018 18:23 UTC, it entered lunar orbit on 12 December 2018 before making the first soft landing on the far side of the Moon on 3 January 2019. Yutu-2 is currently operational as the longest-lived lunar rover after it eclipsed (on 20 November 2019) the previous lunar longevity record of 321 Earth days held by the Soviet Union's Lunokhod 1 rover.

Yutu-2 is the first lunar rover to traverse the far side of the Moon. By January 2022, it had travelled a distance of more than 1,000 metres (3,300 ft) along the lunar surface. Data from its ground penetrating radar (GPR) has been used by scientists to put together imagery of multiple layers deep beneath the surface of the far side of the Moon. As of September 2025, the Yutu-2 was still active, after a period of immobility, images from the LRO in September 2025 showed that it made small movements on the surface in the last lunar days (for a total of over 1,600 meters, about a mile).

== Overview ==
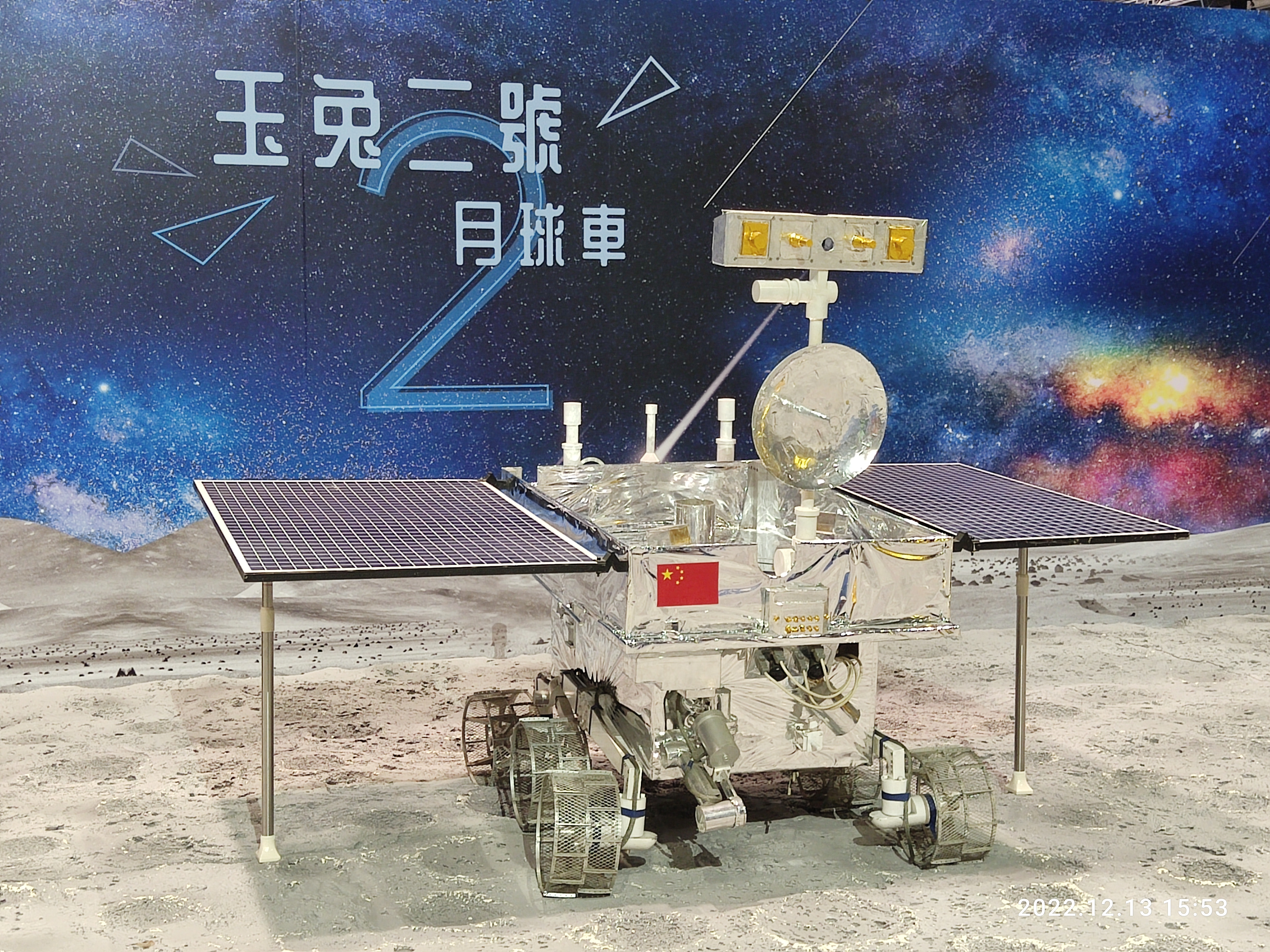
Mockup of Yutu-2 rover.

The total landing mass is 1,200 kg (2,600 lb). Both the stationary lander and Yutu-2 rover (literally: "Jade Rabbit") are equipped with a radioisotope heater unit (RHU) to maintain their subsystems during the long lunar nights, while electrical power is generated by solar panels.

After landing, the lander extended a ramp to deploy the Yutu-2 rover to the lunar surface. The rover measures 1.5 × 1.0 × 1.0 m (4.9 × 3.3 × 3.3 ft) with a mass of 140 kg (310 lb), and is propelled by six wheels. Yutu-2 was manufactured in Dongguan, Guangdong province. The rover is an improvement of the first Yutu rover from 2013; while its nominal operating time is three months, Chinese mission engineers hoped it would operate for "a few years", extending beyond its original planned mission.

The landing craft touched down at 02:26 UTC on 3 January 2019, becoming the first spacecraft to land on the far side of the Moon, and the rover deployed about 12 hours later.

== Science payloads ==
- Panoramic Camera (PCAM), is installed on the rover's mast and can rotate 360°. It has a spectral range of 420 nm–700 nm and it acquires 3D images by binocular stereovision.
- Lunar penetrating radar (LPR), is a ground penetrating radar with a probing depth of approximately 30 m with 30 cm vertical resolution, and more than 100 m with 10 m vertical resolution.
- Visible and Near-Infrared Imaging Spectrometer (VNIS), for imaging spectroscopy that can then be used for identification of surface materials and atmospheric trace gases. The spectral range covers visible to near-infrared wavelengths (450 nm – 950 nm).
- Advanced Small Analyzer for Neutrals (ASAN), is an energetic neutral atom analyzer provided by the Swedish Institute of Space Physics (IRF). It will reveal how solar wind interacts with the lunar surface, which may help determine the process behind the formation of lunar water.

== Cost ==
According to Wu Yanhua, the deputy director of the project, the cost of the entire mission was "close to building one kilometer of subway", which can vary from 500 million yuan (about 72.6 million U.S. dollars) to 1.2 billion yuan (about 172.4 million dollars).

== Landing site ==
The landing site is within the Von Kármán crater (180 km or 110 mi diameter) in the South Pole-Aitken Basin on the far side of the Moon, which was previously unexplored by landers. The site has symbolic as well as scientific value: Theodore von Kármán was the PhD advisor of Qian Xuesen, the founder of the Chinese space program.

== Operations and results ==
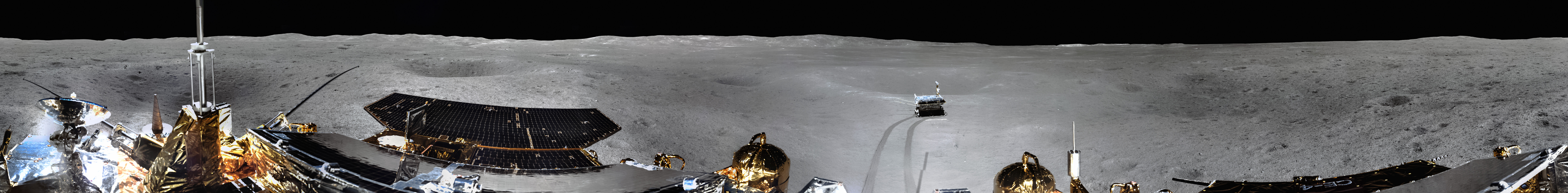
The first panorama from the far side of the Moon

A day after landing, Yutu-2 went into hibernation for its first lunar night and it resumed activities on 10 January 2019, with all instruments operating nominally. During its first full lunar day, the rover travelled 120 m (390 ft), and on 11 February 2019 it powered down for its second lunar night. In May 2019, it was reported that Chang'e 4 has identified what appear to be mantle rocks on the surface, its primary objective.

In November 2019, Yutu 2 broke the lunar longevity record previously held by the Soviet Union's Lunokhod 1 rover which operated on the lunar surface for eleven lunar days (321 Earth days).

In February 2020, Chinese astronomers reported, for the first time, a high-resolution image of a lunar ejecta sequence, and, as well, direct analysis of its internal architecture. These were based on observations made by the rover's Lunar Penetrating Radar (LPR).

Data from its two-channel ground penetrating radar (GPR) has constructed an image of multiple layers beneath the surface to a depth of 300 meters.

=== Gel-like Substance ===
In September 2019, the Yutu-2 rover found a mysterious, unusual "gel-like" substance on the lunar surface inside a small crater in the central region of the Von Kármán crater on the south pole of the far side of the Moon. Further analysis found that the substance resembled rock melted by a lunar impact, and the research indicates that the bright, green material is a rock that was melted by the heat generated by a meteorite impact.

=== Mystery Hut ===
In December 2021, the rover pictured what appeared to be a particularly prominent boulder, dubbed the "Mystery Hut" (神秘小屋), or "Moon Cube", which it was intended to explore in the following lunar days (Earth months). On 7 January 2022, news reported that the rover reached the "Mystery Hut" after traveling for a month, and found it to be "irregularly shaped rock"; resembling a rabbit, with a smaller nearby rock like a carrot, making a fitting discovery for the Yutu (Jade Rabbit).

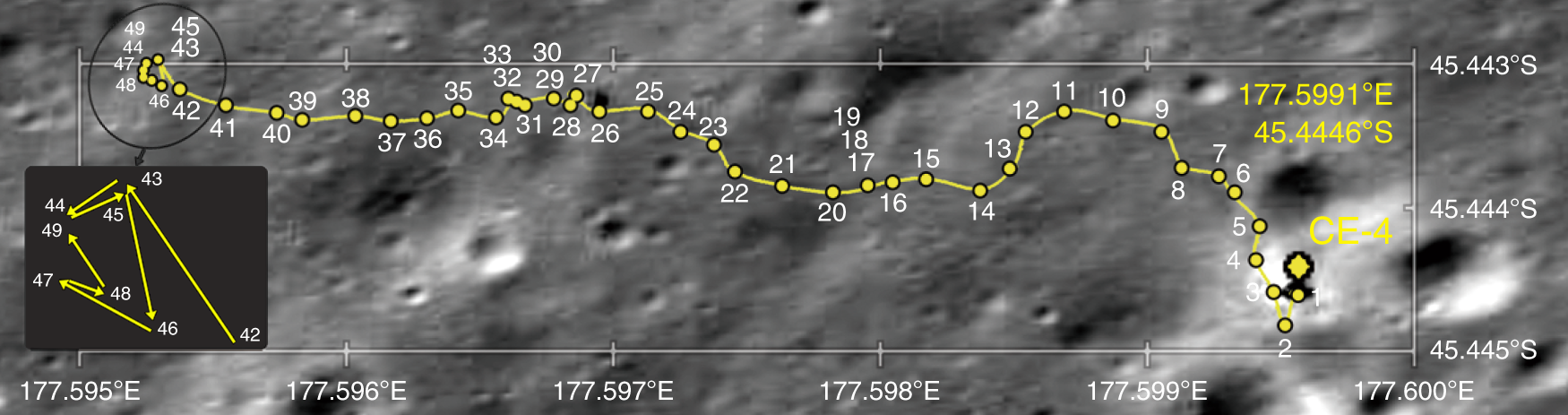
The routing path of the Yutu-2 rover.

As of September 2025, Yutu-2 is moving, after a long break in 2024. According to images from LRO, the rover began to slow down in 2023, before coming to a complete stop in March 2024 and remaining motionless for several months. The rover has been working on the far side of the Moon for 7 years and 9 months, covering a total distance of 1,613 m (1.002 mi). It has exceeded its 3-month design lifespan and currently holds the record for the longest working time on the Moon.

== See also ==
- Chinese Lunar Exploration Program
  - Chang'e 4
- List of missions to the Moon
  - Lunokhod 1
  - Lunokhod 2
  - Yutu, lunar rover
