= Finsen (crater) =

Crater on the Moon

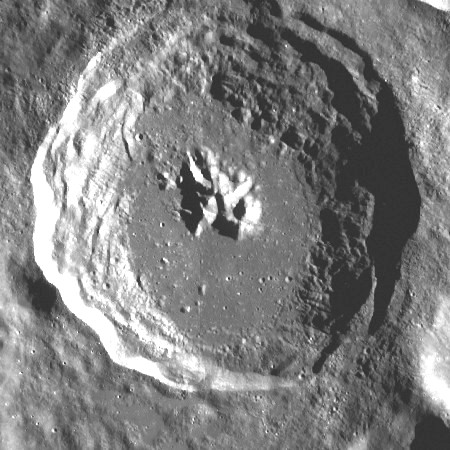
- LRO image
- Coordinates: 42.0°S 177.9°W
- Diameter: 72.98 km (45.35 mi)
- Depth: Unknown
- Colongitude: 179° at sunrise
- Eponym: Niels R. Finsen

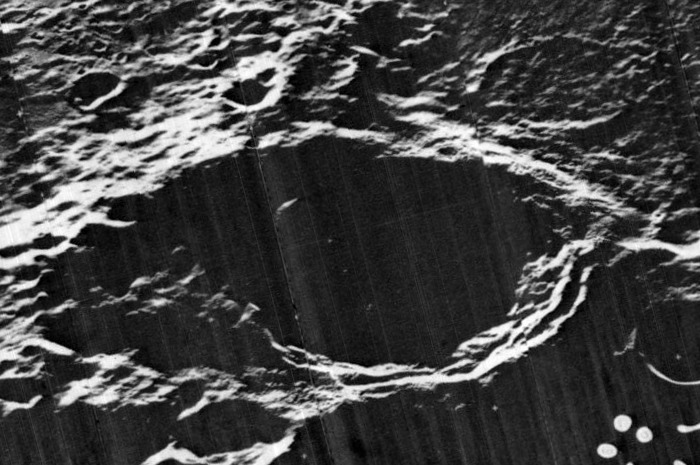
Oblique Lunar Orbiter 5 image, facing west

Finsen is a lunar impact crater that is located in the southern hemisphere, on the Moon's far side. It is attached to the southeastern exterior of the walled plain named Leibnitz, and the ejecta from Finsen covers the southeastern part of Leibnitz's interior floor. To the southwest of Finsen is another walled plain, Von Kármán, partly overlain by Leibnitz. All of these formations are located within the South Pole-Aitken basin.

This formation has been dated to the Eratosthenian epoch of the lunar geologic timescale. However, a 2021 study of Crater size-frequency distribution gives an age of 3.5 Gyr, which is from the Imbrian period. It is a relatively young impact crater with well-defined features that have not been significantly eroded by subsequent impacts. The rim is circular but somewhat uneven along the edge, with outward protrusions along the sides. The inner wall has slumped in places, producing a sharp rim edge in the southern half. There are a number of short terraces along the inner wall.

The inner wall is wider to the north, and so the relatively level interior floor is offset slightly to the south. At the midpoint of the crater is a central peak formation, occupying an area of roughly 15 km. This central peak has a higher albedo than the surrounding floor or rim, giving a lightened appearance. The spectra of this orthopyroxene-rich peak fits a gabbroic norite mineralogy, which originated from a depth of 7.2 to 11.2 km. There are no significant impacts along the crater rim or within the interior.

This crater is named after Danish phototherapist and Nobel laureate Niels Ryberg Finsen. Its designation was formally adopted by the International Astronomical Union in 1979.

== Satellite craters ==
By convention these features are identified on lunar maps by placing the letter on the side of the crater midpoint that is closest to Finsen.

Finsen	Latitude	Longitude	Diameter
C	40.6° S	175.8° W	26 km
G	43.0° S	175.3° W	33 km
