= Chang'e 4 =

2019 Chinese lunar lander & rover

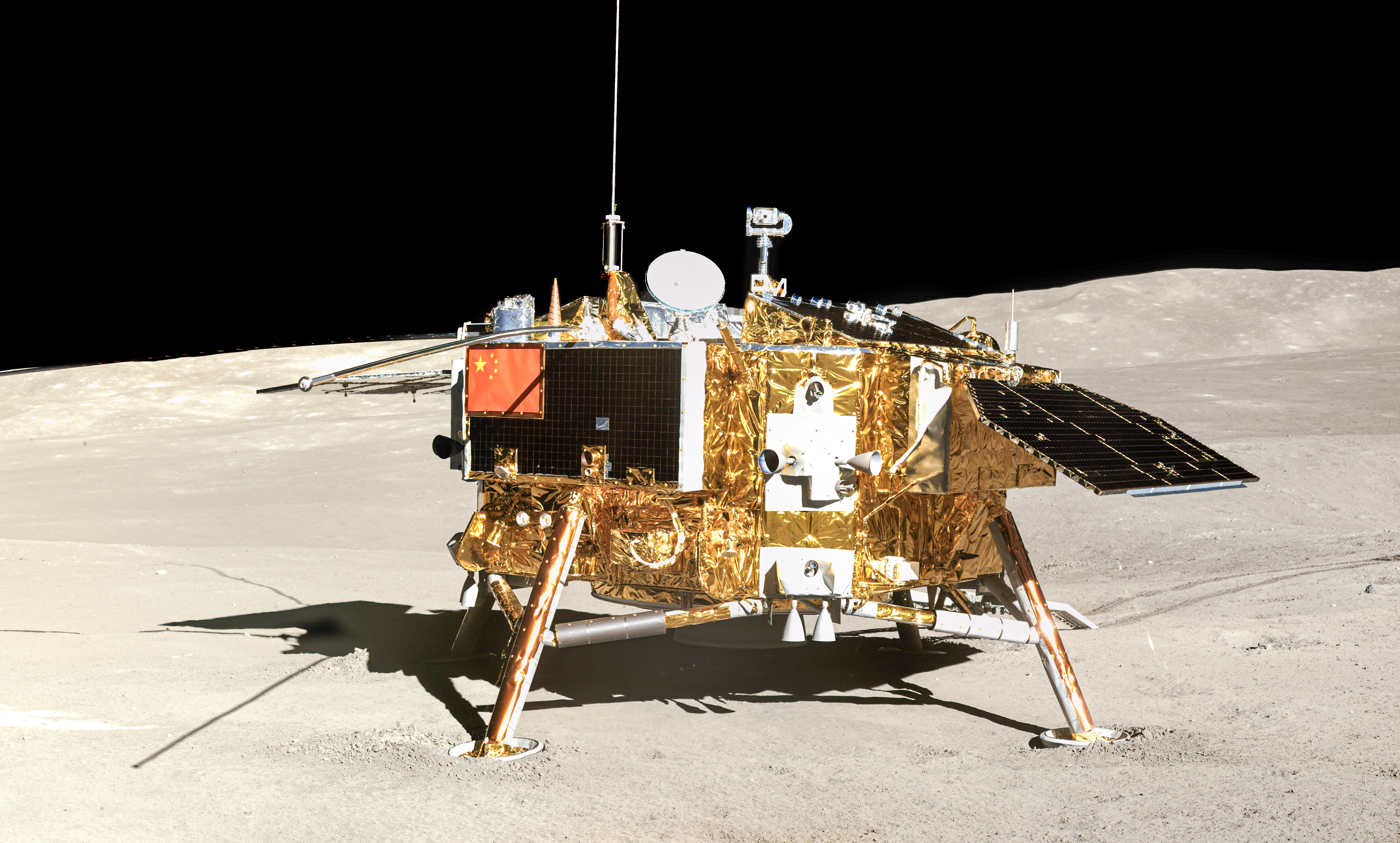
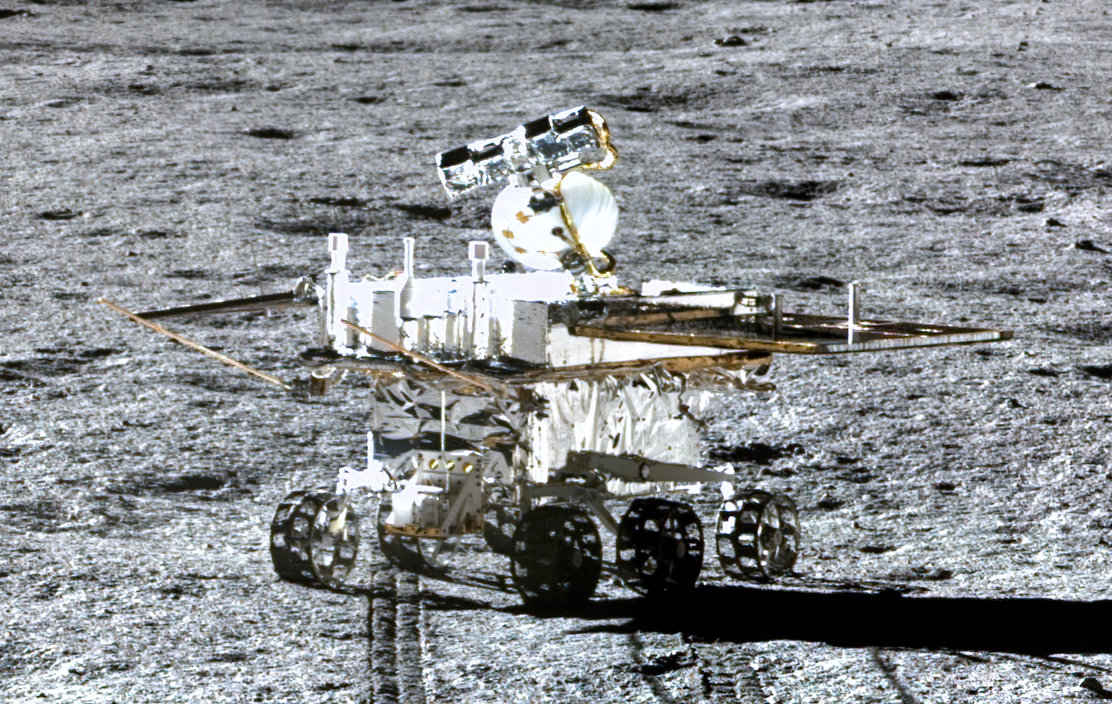
- Top: Chang'e 4 lander on the surface of the Moon; Bottom: Yutu-2 rover on lunar surface.
- Mission type: Lander, lunar rover
- Operator: CNSA
- COSPAR ID: 2018-103A
- SATCAT no.: 43845
- Mission duration: Lander: 12 months (planned); 2873 days (in progress); Rover: 3 months (planned); 2873 days (in progress)

Spacecraft properties
- Launch mass: Total: 3,780 kg Lander: 3,640 kg Rover: 140 kg
- Landing mass: Total: ~1,200 kg; rover: 140 kg
- Dimensions: Rover: 1.5 × 1.0 × 1.0 m

Start of mission
- Launch date: 7 December 2018, 18:23 UTC
- Rocket: Long March 3B
- Launch site: Xichang Satellite Launch Center, LA-2

Lunar lander
- Landing date: 3 January 2019, 02:26 UTC
- Landing site: Spatio Tianhe within Von Kármán crater in the South Pole-Aitken Basin; 45.444°S 177.599°E

Lunar rover
- Landing date: 3 January 2019, 02:26 UTC
- Landing site: Spatio Tianhe within Von Kármán crater in the South Pole-Aitken Basin
- Distance driven: 1.596 km (0.992 mi) as of 4 May 2024

Chang'e 4 (/tʃɑːŋˈə/; Chinese: 嫦娥四号; pinyin: Cháng'é Sìhào; lit. 'Chang'e No. 4') is a robotic spacecraft mission in the Chinese Lunar Exploration Program of the CNSA. It made a soft landing on the far side of the Moon, the first spacecraft to do so, on 3 January 2019.

A communication relay satellite, Queqiao, was first launched to a halo orbit near the Earth–Moon L_{2} point in May 2018. The robotic lander and Yutu-2 (Chinese: 玉兔二号; pinyin: Yùtù Èrhào; lit. 'Jade Rabbit No. 2') rover were launched on 7 December 2018 and entered lunar orbit on 12 December 2018, before landing on the Moon's far side. On 15 January it was announced that seeds had sprouted in the lunar lander's biological experiment, the first plants to sprout on the Moon. The mission is the follow-up to Chang'e 3, the first Chinese landing on the Moon.

The spacecraft was originally built as a backup for Chang'e 3 and became available after Chang'e 3 landed successfully in 2013. The configuration of Chang'e 4 was adjusted to meet new scientific and performance objectives. Like its predecessors, the mission is named after Chang'e, the Chinese Moon goddess.

In November 2019, the Chang'e 4 mission team was awarded a Gold Medal by the Royal Aeronautical Society. In October 2020, the team was awarded the World Space Award by the International Astronautical Federation. Both marked the first time that a Chinese mission had won their respective reward.

== Overview ==
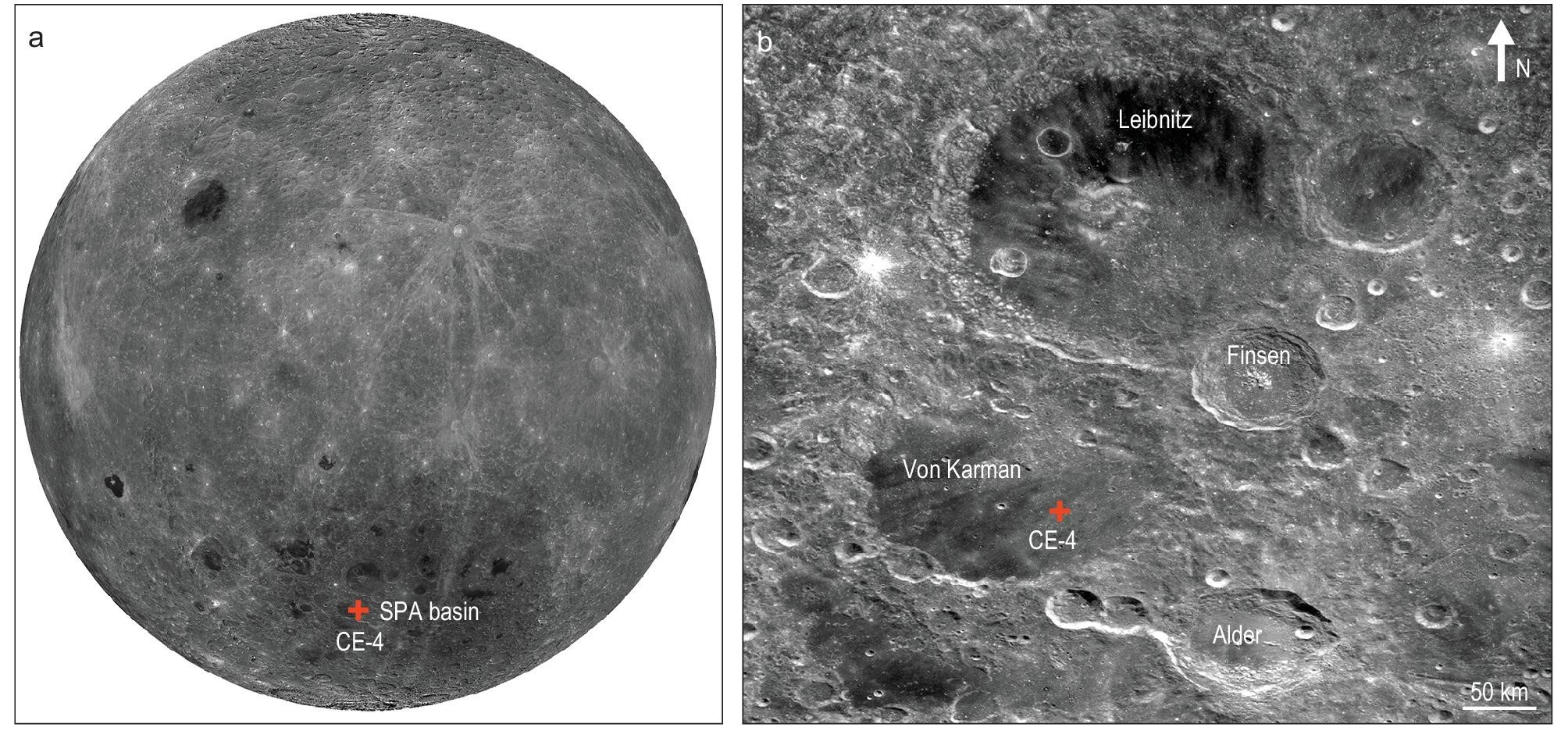
Chang'e 4 landing zone location on the far side of the Moon, which is not visible from Earth due to tidal locking.

The Chinese Lunar Exploration Program is designed to be conducted in four phases of incremental technological advancement: The first is simply reaching lunar orbit, a task completed by Chang'e 1 in 2007 and Chang'e 2 in 2010. The second is landing and roving on the Moon, as Chang'e 3 did in 2013 and Chang'e 4 did in 2019. The third is collecting lunar samples from the near-side and sending them to Earth, a task Chang'e 5 completed in 2020, and Chang'e 6 that completed in 2024. The fourth phase consists of development of a robotic research station near the Moon's south pole.

The program aims to facilitate a crewed lunar landing in the 2030s and possibly the building of an outpost near the south pole. The Chinese Lunar Exploration Program has started to incorporate private investment from individuals and enterprises for the first time, a move aimed at accelerating aerospace innovation, cutting production costs, and promoting military–civilian relationships.

This mission will attempt to determine the age and composition of an unexplored region of the Moon, as well as develop technologies required for the later stages of the program.

The landing craft touched down at 02:26 UTC on 3 January 2019, becoming the first spacecraft to land on the far side of the Moon. Yutu-2 rover was deployed about 12 hours after the landing.

=== Launch ===
The Chang'e 4 mission was first scheduled for launch in 2015 as part of the second phase of the Chinese Lunar Exploration Program. But the adjusted objectives and design of the mission imposed delays, and finally launched on 7 December 2018, 18:23 UTC.

=== Selenocentric phase ===
The spacecraft entered lunar orbit on 12 December 2018, 08:45 UTC. The orbit's perilune was lowered to 15 km (9.3 mi) on 30 December 2018, 00:55 UTC.

Landing took place on 3 January 2019 at 02:26 UTC, shortly after lunar sunrise over the Von Kármán crater in the large South Pole-Aitken basin.

== Objectives ==
An ancient collision event on the Moon left behind a very large crater, called the Aitken Basin, that is now about 13 km (8.1 mi) deep, and it is thought that the massive impactor likely exposed the deep lunar crust, and probably the mantle materials. If Chang'e 4 can find and study some of this material, it would get an unprecedented view into the Moon's internal structure and origins. The specific scientific objectives are:

- Measure the chemical compositions of lunar rocks and soils
- Measure lunar surface temperature over the duration of the mission.
- Carry out low-frequency radio astronomical observation and research using a radio telescope
- Study of cosmic rays
- Observe the solar corona, investigate its radiation characteristics and mechanism, and explore the evolution and transport of coronal mass ejections (CME) between the Sun and Earth.

== Components ==
=== Queqiao relay satellite ===
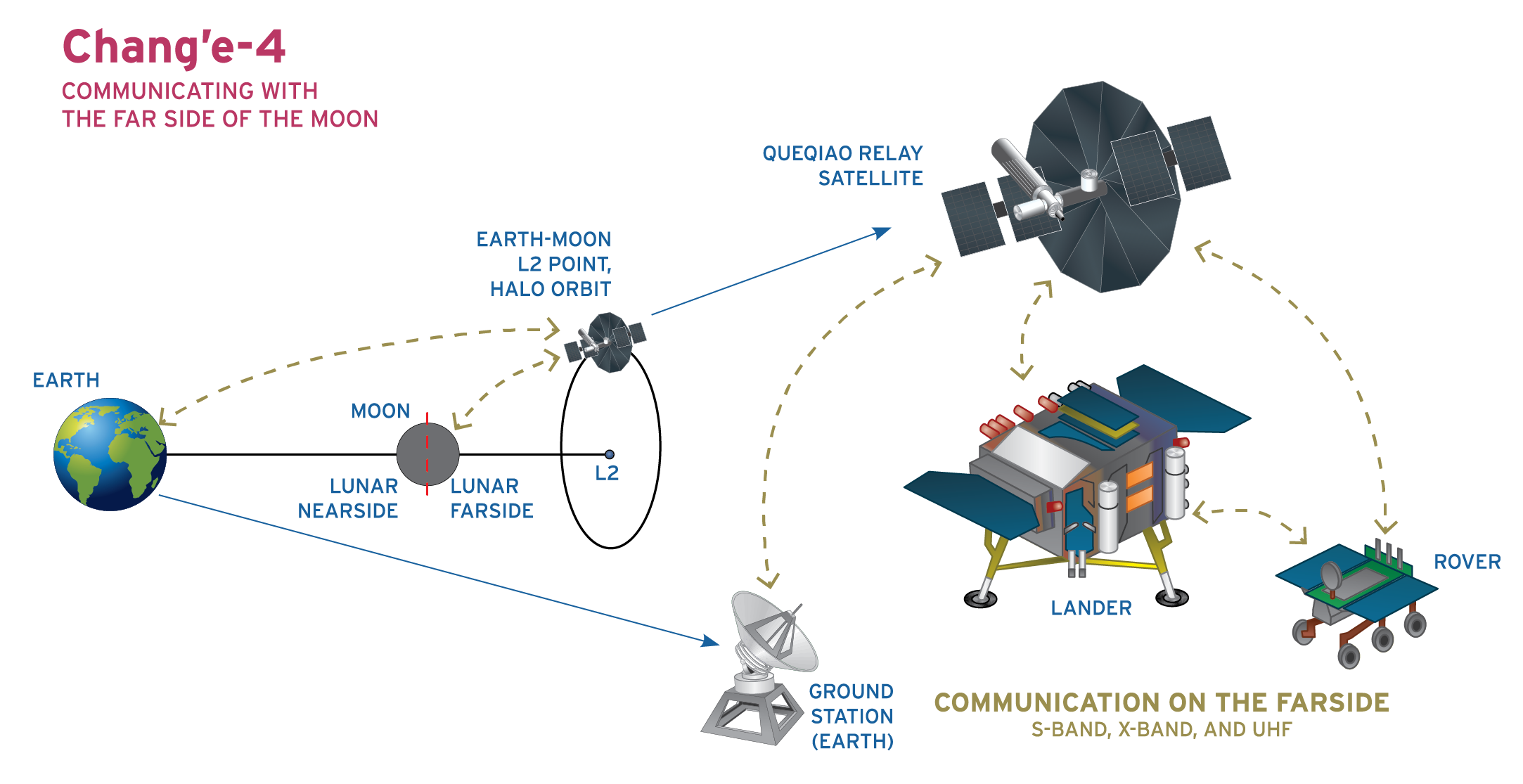
Communication with Chang'e 4 on the Moon's far side

Earth-Moon Lagrangian points: A satellite in a halo orbit around L_{2}, which is behind the Moon, will have a view of both the Earth and the Moon's far side

Direct communication with Earth is impossible on the far side of the Moon, since transmissions are blocked by the Moon. Communications must go through a communications relay satellite, which is placed at a location that has a clear view of both the landing site and the Earth. As part of the Lunar Exploration Program, the China National Space Administration (CNSA) launched the Queqiao (Chinese: 鹊桥; pinyin: Quèqiáo; lit. 'Magpie Bridge') relay satellite on 20 May 2018 to a halo orbit around the Earth–Moon L_{2} point. The relay satellite is based on the Chang'e 2 design, has a mass of 425 kg (937 lb), and it uses a 4.2 m (14 ft) antenna to receive X band signals from the lander and rover, and relay them to Earth control on the S band.

The spacecraft took 24 days to reach L_{2}, using a lunar swing-by to save fuel. On 14 June 2018, Queqiao finished its final adjustment burn and entered the L_{2} halo mission orbit, which is about 65,000 kilometres (40,000 mi) from the Moon. This is the first lunar relay satellite at this location.

The name Queqiao ("Magpie Bridge") was inspired by and came from the Chinese tale The Cowherd and the Weaver Girl.

=== Longjiang microsatellites ===
As part of the Chang'e 4 mission, two microsatellites (45 kg or 99 lb each) named Longjiang-1 and Longjiang-2 (Chinese: 龙江; pinyin: Lóng Jiāng; lit. 'Dragon River'; also known as Discovering the Sky at Longest Wavelengths Pathfinder or DSLWP), were launched along with Queqiao in May 2018. Both satellites were developed by Harbin Institute of Technology, China. Longjiang-1 failed to enter lunar orbit, but Longjiang-2 succeeded and operated in lunar orbit until 31 July 2019 when it was deliberately directed to crash onto the Moon.

Longjiang 2's crash site is located at 16.6956°N 159.5170°E inside Van Gent crater, where it made a 4 by 5 metre crater upon impact. These microsatellites were tasked to observe the sky at very low frequencies (1–30 megahertz), corresponding to wavelengths of 300 to 10 metres (984 to 33 ft), with the aim of studying energetic phenomena from celestial sources. Due to the Earth's ionosphere, no observations in this frequency range have been done in Earth orbit, offering potential breakthrough science.

=== Chang'e lander and Yutu-2 rover ===
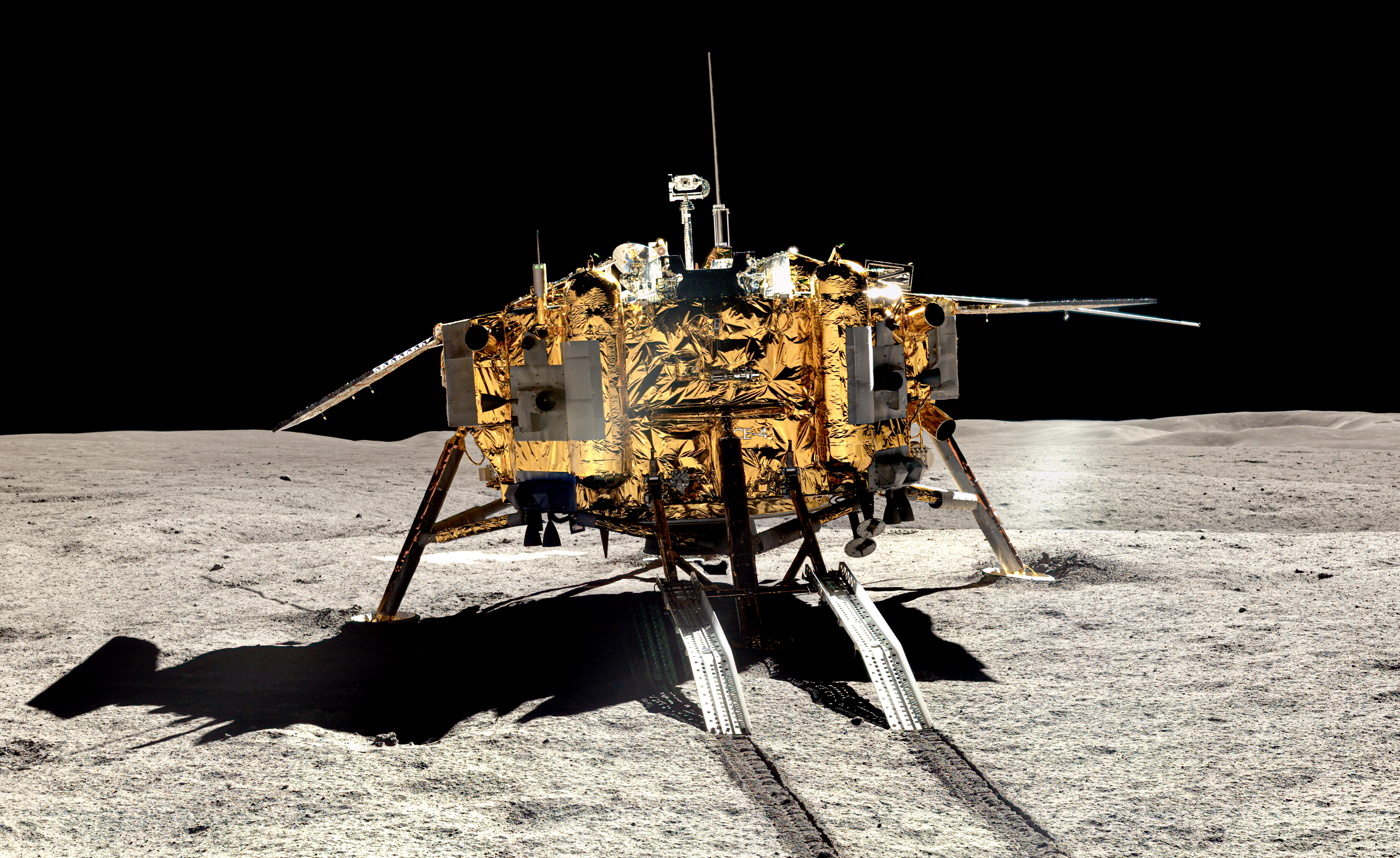
Chang'e 4 lander and the ramp designed for the Yutu-2 rover deployment.

The Chang'e 4 lander and rover design was modeled after Chang'e-3 and its Yutu rover. In fact, Chang'e 4 was built as a backup to Chang'e 3, and based on the experience and results from that mission, Chang'e 4 was adapted to the specifics of the new mission. The lander and rover were launched by Long March 3B rocket on 7 December 2018, 18:23 UTC, six months after the launch of the Queqiao relay satellite.

The total landing mass is 1,200 kg (2,600 lb). Both the stationary lander and Yutu-2 rover are equipped with a radioisotope heater unit (RHU) in order to heat their subsystems during the long lunar nights, while electrical power is generated by solar panels.

After landing, the lander extended a ramp to deploy the Yutu-2 rover (literally: "Jade Rabbit") to the lunar surface. The rover measures 1.5 × 1.0 × 1.0 m (4.9 × 3.3 × 3.3 ft) and has a mass of 140 kg (310 lb). Yutu-2 rover was manufactured by the China Academy of Space Technology; it is solar-powered, RHU-heated, and it is propelled by six wheels. The rover's nominal operating time is three months, but after the experience with Yutu rover in 2013, the rover design was improved and Chinese engineers are hopeful it will operate for "a few years". On November 21, 2019, Yutu 2 broke the lunar longevity record, of 322 Earth days, previously held by the Soviet Union's Lunokhod 1 rover (November 17, 1970 to October 4, 1971).

== Science payloads ==
The communications relay satellite, orbiting microsatellite, lander and rover each carry scientific payloads. The relay satellite is performing radio astronomy, whereas the lander and Yutu-2 rover will study the geophysics of the landing zone. The science payloads are, in part, supplied by international partners in Sweden, Germany, the Netherlands, and Saudi Arabia.

=== Relay satellite ===
The primary function of the Queqiao relay satellite that is deployed in a halo orbit around the Earth–Moon L_{2} point is to provide continuous relay communications between Earth and the lander on the far side of the Moon.

The Queqiao launched on 21 May 2018. It used a lunar swing-by transfer orbit to reach the Moon. After the first trajectory correction maneuvers (TCMs), the spacecraft is in place. On 25 May, Queqiao approached the vicinity of the L_{2}. After several small adjustments, Queqiao arrived at L_{2} halo orbit on 14 June.

Additionally, this satellite hosts the Netherlands–China Low-Frequency Explorer (NCLE), an instrument performing astrophysical studies in the unexplored radio regime of 80 kilohertz to 80 megahertz. It was developed by the Radboud University in Netherlands and the Chinese Academy of Sciences. The NCLE on the orbiter and the LFS on the lander work in synergy performing low-frequency (0.1–80 MHz) radio astronomical observations.

=== Lunar lander ===
The lander and rover carry scientific payloads to study the geophysics of the landing zone, with a life science and modest chemical analysis capability. The lander is equipped with the following payloads:

- Landing Camera (LCAM), mounted on the bottom of the spacecraft, the camera began to produce a video stream at the height of 12 km (7.5 mi) above the lunar surface.
- Terrain Camera (TCAM), mounted on top of the lander and able to rotate 360°, is being used to image the lunar surface and the rover in high definition.
- Low Frequency Spectrometer (LFS) to research solar radio bursts at frequencies between 0.1 and 40 MHz and to study the lunar ionosphere.
- Lunar Lander Neutrons and Dosimetry (LND), a (neutron) dosimeter developed by Kiel University in Germany. It is gathering information about radiation dosimetry for future human exploration of the Moon, and will contribute to solar wind studies. It has shown that the radiation dose on the surface of the Moon is 2 to 3 times higher than what astronauts experience in the ISS.
- Lunar Micro Ecosystem, is a 3 kg (6.6 lb) sealed biosphere cylinder 18 cm (7.1 in) long and 16 cm (6.3 in) in diameter with seeds and insect eggs to test whether plants and insects could hatch and grow together in synergy. The experiment includes six types of organisms: cottonseed, potato, rapeseed, Arabidopsis thaliana (a flowering plant), as well as yeast and fruit fly eggs. Environmental systems keep the container hospitable and Earth-like, except for the low lunar gravity and radiation. If the fly eggs hatch, the larvae would produce carbon dioxide, while the germinated plants would release oxygen through photosynthesis. It was hoped that together, the plants and fruit flies could establish a simple synergy within the container. Yeast would play a role in regulating carbon dioxide and oxygen, as well as decomposing processed waste from the flies and the dead plants to create an additional food source for the insects. The biological experiment was designed by 28 Chinese universities. Research in such closed ecological systems informs astrobiology and the development of biological life support systems for long duration missions in space stations or space habitats for eventual space farming.

Result: Within a few hours after landing on 3 January 2019, the biosphere's temperature was adjusted to 24 °C and the seeds were watered. On 15 January 2019, it was reported that cottonseed, rapeseed and potato seeds had sprouted, but images of only cottonseed were released. However, on 16 January, it was reported that the experiment was terminated due to an external temperature drop to −52 °C (−62 °F) as the lunar night set in, and a failure to warm the biosphere close to 24 °C. The experiment was terminated after nine days instead of the planned 100 days, but valuable information was obtained.

=== Lunar rover ===
- Panoramic Camera (PCAM), is installed on the rover's mast and can rotate 360°. It has a spectral range of 420 nm–700 nm and it acquires 3D images by binocular stereovision.
- Lunar penetrating radar (LPR), is a ground penetrating radar with a probing depth of approximately 30 m with 30 cm vertical resolution, and more than 100 m with 10 m vertical resolution.
- Visible and Near-Infrared Imaging Spectrometer (VNIS), for imaging spectroscopy that can then be used for identification of surface materials and atmospheric trace gases. The spectral range covers visible to near-infrared wavelengths (450 nm - 950 nm).
- Advanced Small Analyzer for Neutrals (ASAN), is an energetic neutral atom analyzer provided by the Swedish Institute of Space Physics (IRF). It will reveal how solar wind interacts with the lunar surface, which may help determine the process behind the formation of lunar water.

== Cost ==
According to the deputy project director, who would not quote an exact amount, "The cost (of the entire mission) is close to building one kilometer of subway." The cost-per-kilometre of subway in China varies from 500 million yuan (about US$72 million) to 1.2 billion yuan (about US$172 million), based on the difficulty of construction.

== Landing site ==
The landing site is within a crater called Von Kármán (180 km (110 mi) diameter) in the South Pole-Aitken Basin on the far side of the Moon that was still unexplored by landers. The site has symbolic as well as scientific value. Theodore von Kármán was the PhD advisor of Qian Xuesen, the founder of the Chinese space program.

The landing craft touched down at 02:26 UTC on 3 January 2019, becoming the first spacecraft to land on the far side of the Moon.

The Yutu-2 rover was deployed about 12 hours after the landing.

The selenographic coordinates of the landing site are 177.5991°E, 45.4446°S, at an elevation of -5935 m. The landing site was later (February 2019) named Statio Tianhe. Four other lunar features were also named during this mission: a mountain (Mons Tai) and three craters (Zhinyu, Hegu, and Tianjin).

Images of Chang'e 4 landing site
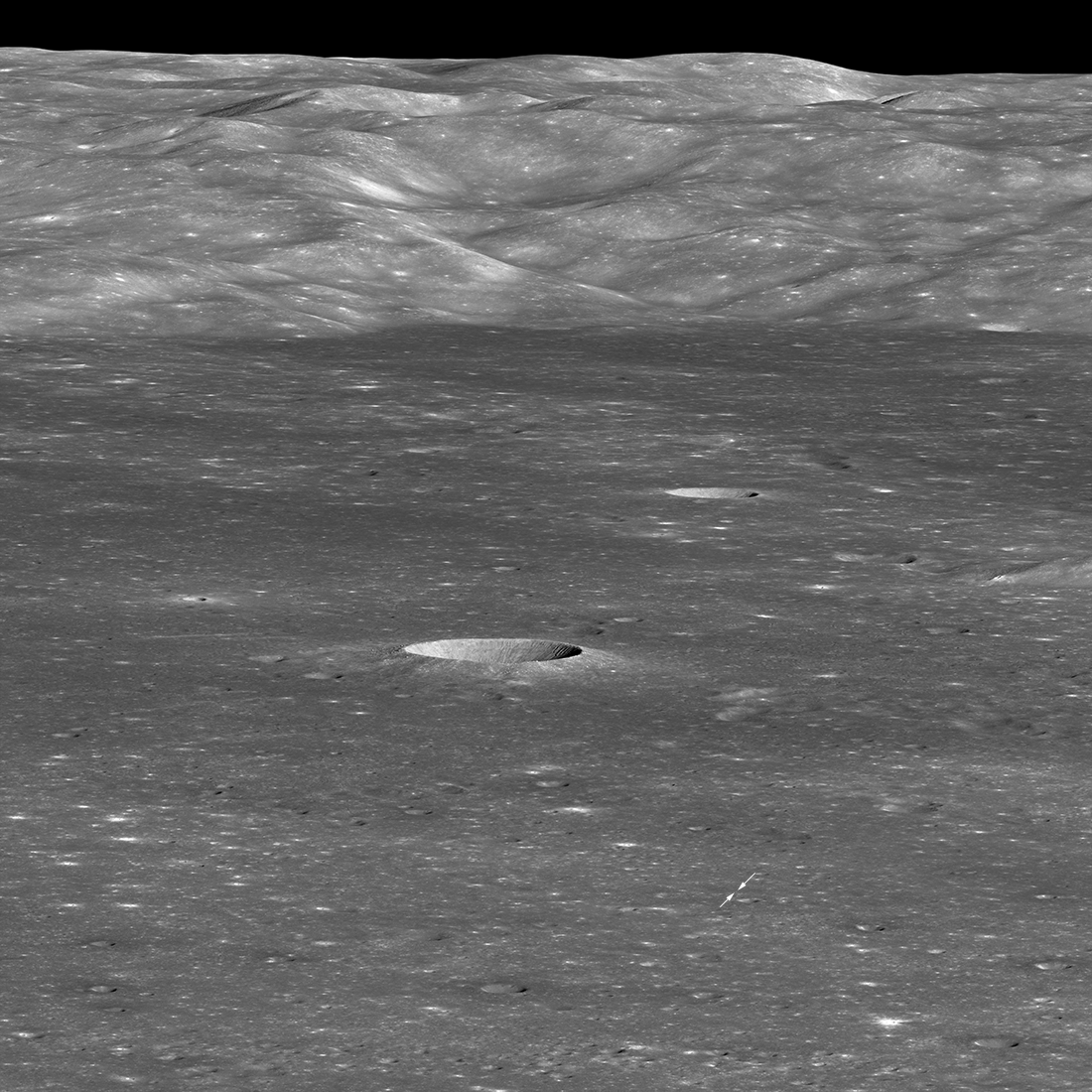
A view of landing site, marked by two small arrows, taken by the Lunar Reconnaissance Orbiter on 30 January 2019

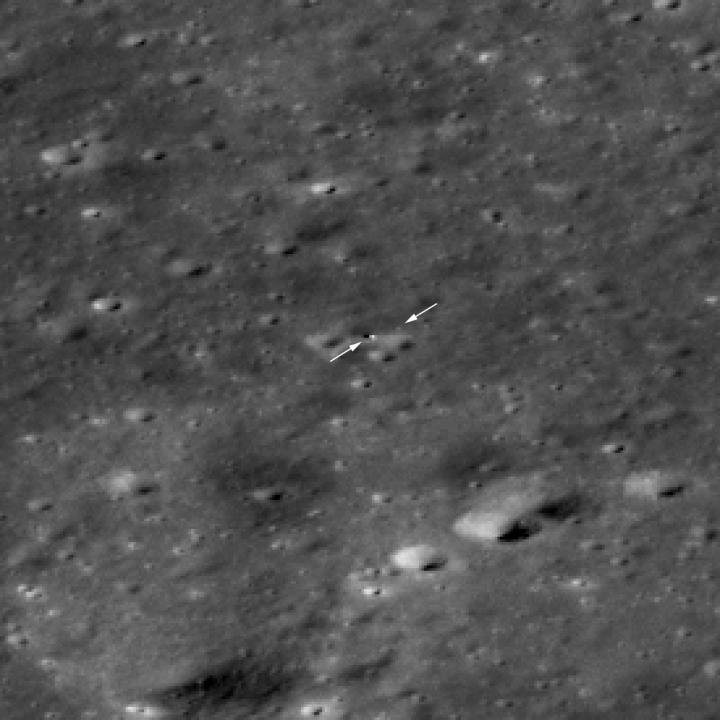
Chang'e 4 – Lander (left arrow) and Rover (right arrow) on the Moon surface (NASA photo, 8 February 2019).

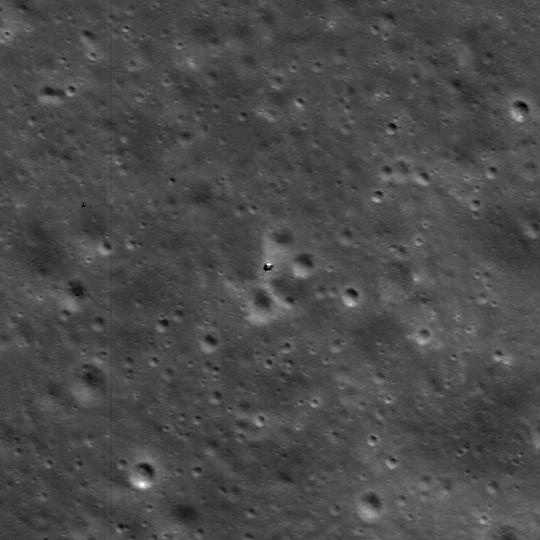
Chang'e 4 lander (center) and rover (west-northwest of lander) 6 months after landing.

== Operations and results ==
A few days after landing, Yutu-2 went into hibernation for its first lunar night and it resumed activities on 29 January 2019 with all instruments operating nominally. During its first full lunar day, the rover travelled 120 m (390 ft), and on 11 February 2019 it powered down for its second lunar night. In May 2019, it was reported that Chang'e 4 has identified what appear to be mantle rocks on the surface, its primary objective.

In January 2020, China released a large amount of data and high-resolution images from the mission lander and rover. In February 2020, Chinese astronomers reported, for the first time, a high-resolution image of a lunar ejecta sequence, and, as well, direct analysis of its internal architecture. These were based on observations made by the Lunar Penetrating Radar (LPR) on board the Yutu-2 rover while studying the far side of the Moon.

== International collaboration ==
Chang'e 4 marks the first major United States-China collaboration in space exploration since the 2011 Congressional ban. Scientists from both countries had regular contact prior to the landing. This included talks about observing plumes and particles lofted from the lunar surface by the probe's rocket exhaust during the landing to compare the results with theoretical predictions, but NASA's Lunar Reconnaissance Orbiter (LRO) was not in the right position for this during the landing. The Americans informed Chinese scientists about its satellites in orbit around the Moon, while the Chinese shared with American scientists the longitude, latitude, and timing of Chang'e 4's landing.

China has agreed to a request from NASA to use the Chang'e 4 probe and Queqiao relay satellite in future American Moon missions.

== International reactions ==
NASA Administrator Jim Bridenstine congratulated China and hailed the success of the mission as "an impressive accomplishment".

Martin Wieser of the Swedish Institute of Space Physics and principal investigator on one of the instruments onboard Chang'e, said: "We know the far side from orbital images and satellites, but we don't know it from the surface. It's uncharted territory and that makes it very exciting."

== Gallery ==
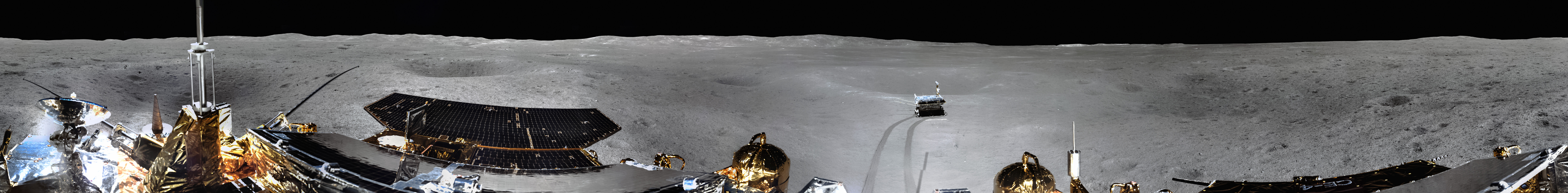
The first panorama from the far side of the Moon by Chang'e 4 lander, with the Yutu-2 rover

== See also ==
- Animals in space
- Plants in space
- Closed ecological system
- Exploration of the Moon
- List of missions to the Moon
- Luna 3, the first spacecraft to image the lunar far side
- List of artificial objects on the Moon
