= Far side of the Moon =

Hemisphere of the Moon that always faces away from Earth

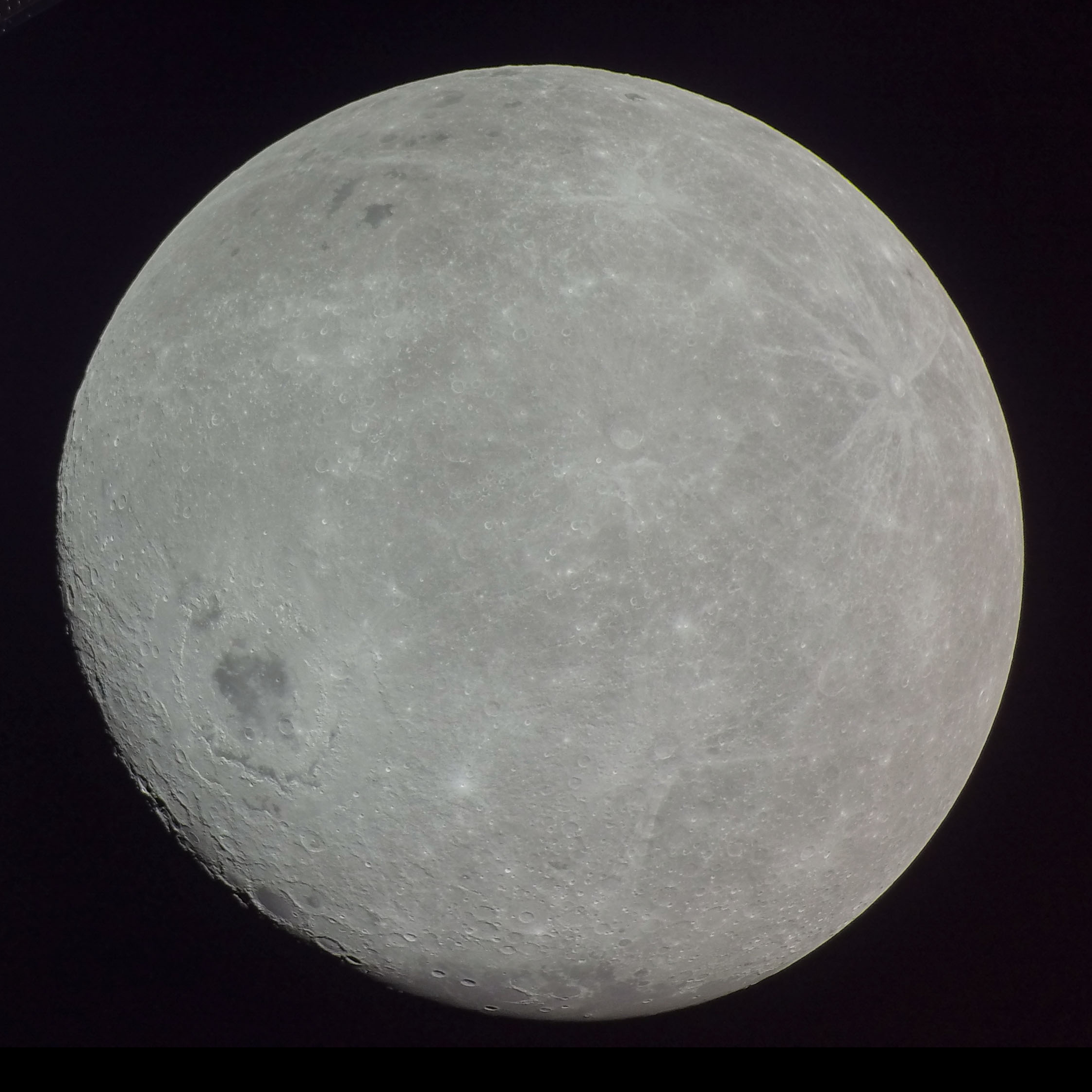
Photograph of the far side of the Moon, with Mare Orientale (center left) and the mare of the crater Apollo (top left) being visible, taken by Orion spacecraft during the Artemis 1 mission.

The far side of the Moon, also called the dark side of the Moon, is the hemisphere of the Moon that faces away from Earth; the opposite hemisphere being the near side. Due to tidal locking, the time it takes for the Moon to orbit the Earth once is equal to the time it takes for the Moon to rotate once, thus, the far side of the Moon never fully comes into view from Earth's surface. The far side has sometimes been called the "dark side of the Moon", where "dark" means "unseen" instead of "unilluminated". There is however a common misconception that the dark side of the Moon is so-called because it never receives light, when each location on the Moon experiences two weeks of sunlight while the opposite location experiences night. The far side is actually more reflective than the near side, as it lacks the large areas of darker maria surface.

About 18% of the far side is occasionally visible from Earth due to oscillation and to libration. The remaining 82% remained unobserved until 1959, when it was photographed by the Soviet Luna 3 space probe. The Soviet Academy of Sciences published the first atlas of the far side in 1960. The Apollo 8 astronauts were the first humans to see the far side in person when they orbited the Moon in December of 1968. Compared to the near side, the far side's terrain is rugged, with a multitude of impact craters and relatively few flat and dark lunar maria ("seas"), giving it an appearance closer to other barren places in the Solar System such as Mercury and Callisto. It has one of the largest craters in the Solar System, the South Pole–Aitken basin.

All crewed and uncrewed soft landings had taken place on the near side of the Moon, until January 3, 2019, when the Chang'e 4 spacecraft made the first landing on the far side. The Chang'e 6 sample-return mission was launched on May 3, 2024, landed in the Apollo basin in the southern hemisphere of the lunar far side and returned to Earth a month later on June 25 with humanity's first lunar samples retrieved from the far side.

Astronomers have suggested installing a large radio telescope on the far side, where the Moon would shield it from possible radio interference from Earth.

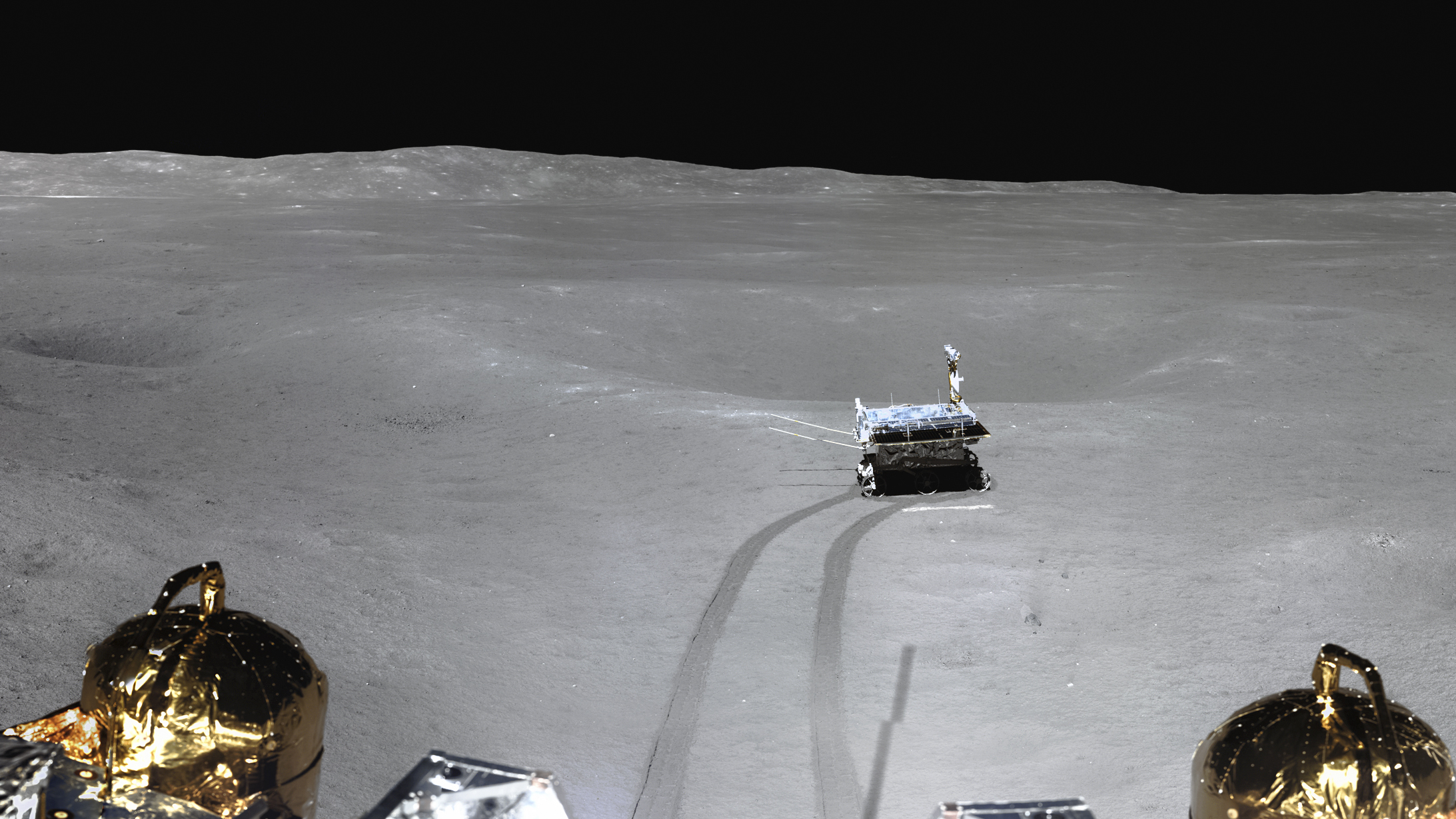
The ground surface of the lunar far side with the Yutu-2 rover (center), captured by the Chang'e 4 lander.

== Definition ==
Due to tidal locking, the inhabitants of the central body (Earth) will never be able to see the green area of the satellite (Moon).

Tidal forces from Earth have slowed the Moon's rotation to the point where the same side is always facing the Earth—a phenomenon called tidal locking. The other face, most of which is never visible from the Earth, is therefore called the "far side of the Moon". Over time, some crescent-shaped edges of the far side can be seen due to libration. In total, 59 percent of the Moon's surface is visible from Earth at one time or another. Useful observation of the parts of the far side of the Moon occasionally visible from Earth is difficult because of the low viewing angle from Earth (they cannot be observed "full on").

A common misconception holds that the Moon does not rotate on its axis. If that were so, the whole of the Moon would be visible to Earth over the course of its orbit. Instead, its rotation period matches its orbital period, meaning it turns around once for every orbit it makes: in Earth terms, it could be said that its day and its year have the same length (i.e., ~29.5 earth days).

Despite a common misconception, the phrase "dark side of the Moon" does not refer to "dark" as in the absence of light, but rather "dark" as in unseen: until humans were able to send spacecraft around the Moon, this area had never been seen. In reality, both the near and far sides receive, on average, almost equal amounts of light directly from the Sun. This symmetry is complicated by sunlight reflected from the Earth onto the near side (earthshine), and by lunar eclipses, which occur only when the far side is already dark. Lunar eclipses mean that the side facing Earth receives fractionally less sunlight than the far side when considered over a long period of time.

At night under a "full Earth" the near side of the Moon receives on the order of 10 lux of illumination (about what a city sidewalk under streetlights gets; this is 34 times more light than is received on Earth under a full Moon) whereas the far side of the Moon during the lunar night receives only about 0.001 lux of starlight. Only during a full Moon (as viewed from Earth) is the whole far side of the Moon dark.

The word dark has expanded to refer also to the fact that communication with spacecraft can be blocked while the spacecraft is on the far side of the Moon, during Apollo space missions for example.

== Differences ==
Detailed view with Mare Moscoviense visible, by the Lunar Reconnaissance Orbiter (LRO)

The two hemispheres of the Moon have dramatically different appearances, with the near side covered in multiple, large maria (Latin for 'seas', since the earliest astronomers incorrectly thought that these plains were seas of lunar water).

The far side has a battered, densely cratered appearance with few maria. Only 1% of the surface of the far side is covered by maria, compared to 31.2% on the near side, making the far side brighter. One commonly accepted explanation for this difference is related to a higher concentration of heat-producing elements on the near-side hemisphere, as has been demonstrated by geochemical maps obtained from the Lunar Prospector gamma-ray spectrometer. While other factors, such as surface elevation and crustal thickness, could also affect where basalts erupt, these do not explain why the far side South Pole–Aitken basin (which contains the lowest elevations of the Moon and possesses a thin crust) was not as volcanically active as Oceanus Procellarum on the near side.

It has also been proposed that the differences between the two hemispheres may have been caused by a collision with a smaller companion moon that also originated from the Theia collision. In this model, the impact led to an accretionary pile rather than a crater, contributing a hemispheric layer of extent and thickness that may be consistent with the dimensions of the far side highlands. The chemical composition of the far side is inconsistent with this model.

The far side has more visible craters. This is thought to be a result of the effects of lunar lava flows, which cover and obscure craters, rather than a shielding effect from the Earth. NASA calculates that the Earth obscures only about 4 square degrees out of 41,000 square degrees of the sky as seen from the Moon. "This makes the Earth negligible as a shield for the Moon [and] it is likely that each side of the Moon has received equal numbers of impacts, but the resurfacing by lava results in fewer craters visible on the near side than the far side, even though both sides have received the same number of impacts."

Newer research suggests that heat from Earth at the time when the Moon was formed is the reason the near side has fewer impact craters. The lunar crust consists primarily of plagioclases formed when aluminium and calcium condensed and combined with silicates in the mantle. The cooler far side experienced condensation of these elements sooner and so formed a thicker crust; meteoroid impacts on the near side would sometimes penetrate the thinner crust here and release basaltic lava that created the maria, but would rarely do so on the far side.

The far side exhibits more extreme variations in terrain elevation than the near side. The Moon's highest and lowest points, along with its tallest mountains measured from base to peak, are all located on the far side.

== Exploration ==
=== Early exploration ===
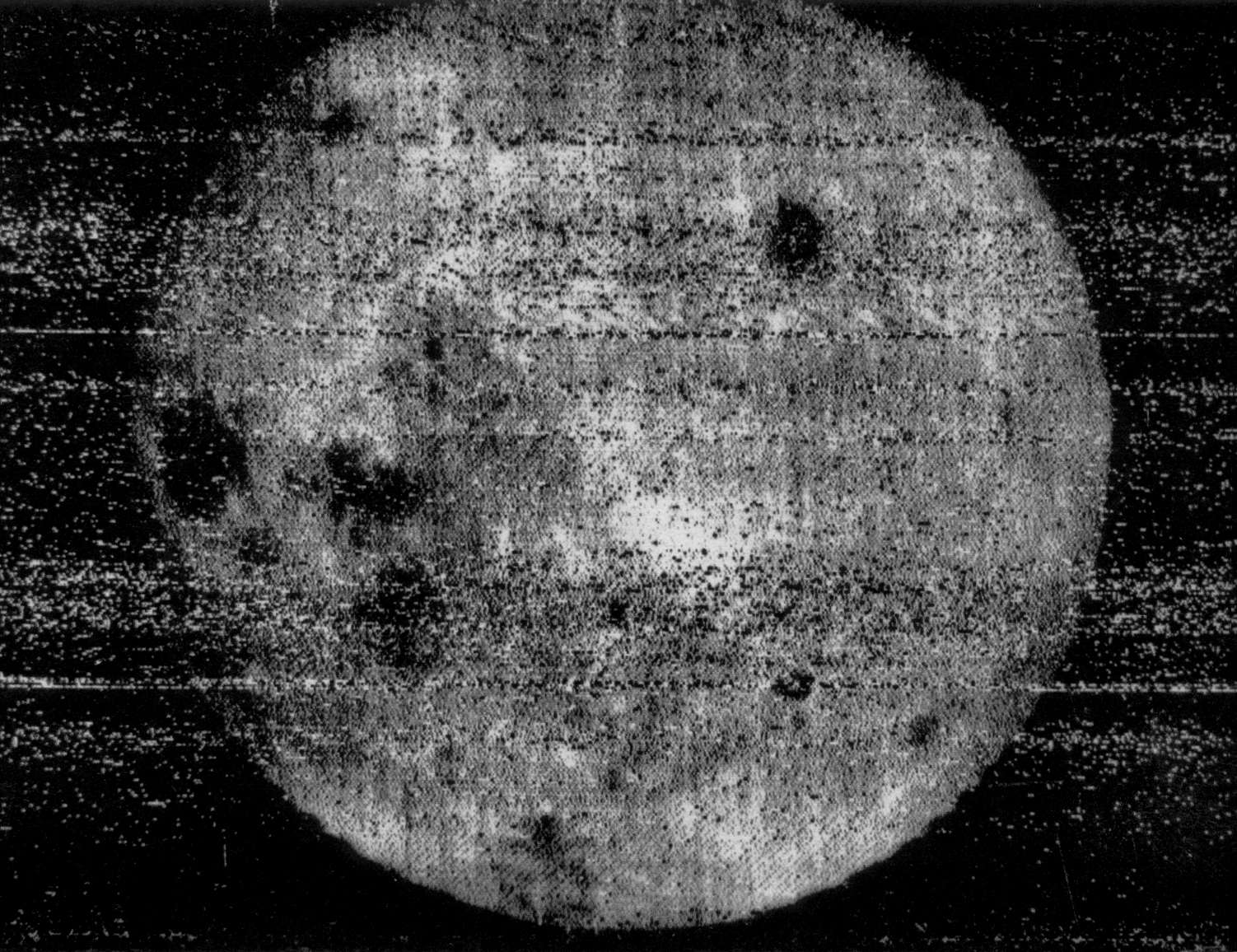
The 7 October 1959 image by Luna 3, which revealed for the first time the far side of the Moon. Clearly visible is Mare Moscoviense (top right) and a mare triplet of Mare Crisium, Mare Marginis and Mare Smythii (left center).

Until the late 1950s, little was known about the far side of the Moon. Librations periodically allowed limited glimpses of features near the lunar limb on the far side, but only up to 59% of the total surface of the Moon. These features were seen from a low angle, hindering useful observation (it proved difficult to distinguish a crater from a mountain range). The remaining 82% of the surface on the far side remained unknown, and its properties were subject to much speculation.

An example of a far side feature that can be seen through libration is the Mare Orientale, which is a prominent impact basin spanning almost 1,000 km (600 miles), yet this was not even named as a feature until 1906, by Julius Franz in Der Mond. The true nature of the basin was discovered in the 1960s when rectified images were projected onto a globe. The basin was photographed in fine detail by Lunar Orbiter 4 in 1967. Before space exploration began, astronomers expected that the far side would be similar to the side visible to Earth.

On 7 October 1959, the Soviet probe Luna 3 took the first photographs of the lunar far side, eighteen of them resolvable, covering one-third of the surface invisible from the Earth. The images were analysed, and the first atlas of the far side of the Moon was published by the USSR Academy of Sciences on 6 November 1960. It included a catalog of 500 distinguished features of the landscape. In 1961, the first globe (1:13600000 scale) containing lunar features invisible from the Earth was released in the USSR, based on images from Luna 3.

On 20 July 1965, another Soviet probe, Zond 3, transmitted 25 pictures of very good quality of the lunar far side, with much better resolution than those from Luna 3. In particular, they revealed chains of craters, hundreds of kilometers in length, but, unexpectedly, no mare plains like those visible from Earth with the naked eye. In 1967, the second part of the Atlas of the Far Side of the Moon was published in Moscow, based on data from Zond 3, with the catalog now including 4,000 newly discovered features of the lunar far side landscape. In the same year, the first Complete Map of the Moon (1:5000000 scale) and updated complete globe (1:10000000 scale), featuring 95 percent of the lunar surface, were released in the Soviet Union.

As many prominent landscape features of the far side were discovered by Soviet space probes, Soviet scientists selected names for them. This caused some controversy, though the Soviet Academy of Sciences selected many non-Soviet names, including Jules Verne, Marie Curie and Thomas Edison. The International Astronomical Union later accepted many of the names.

=== Further survey missions ===
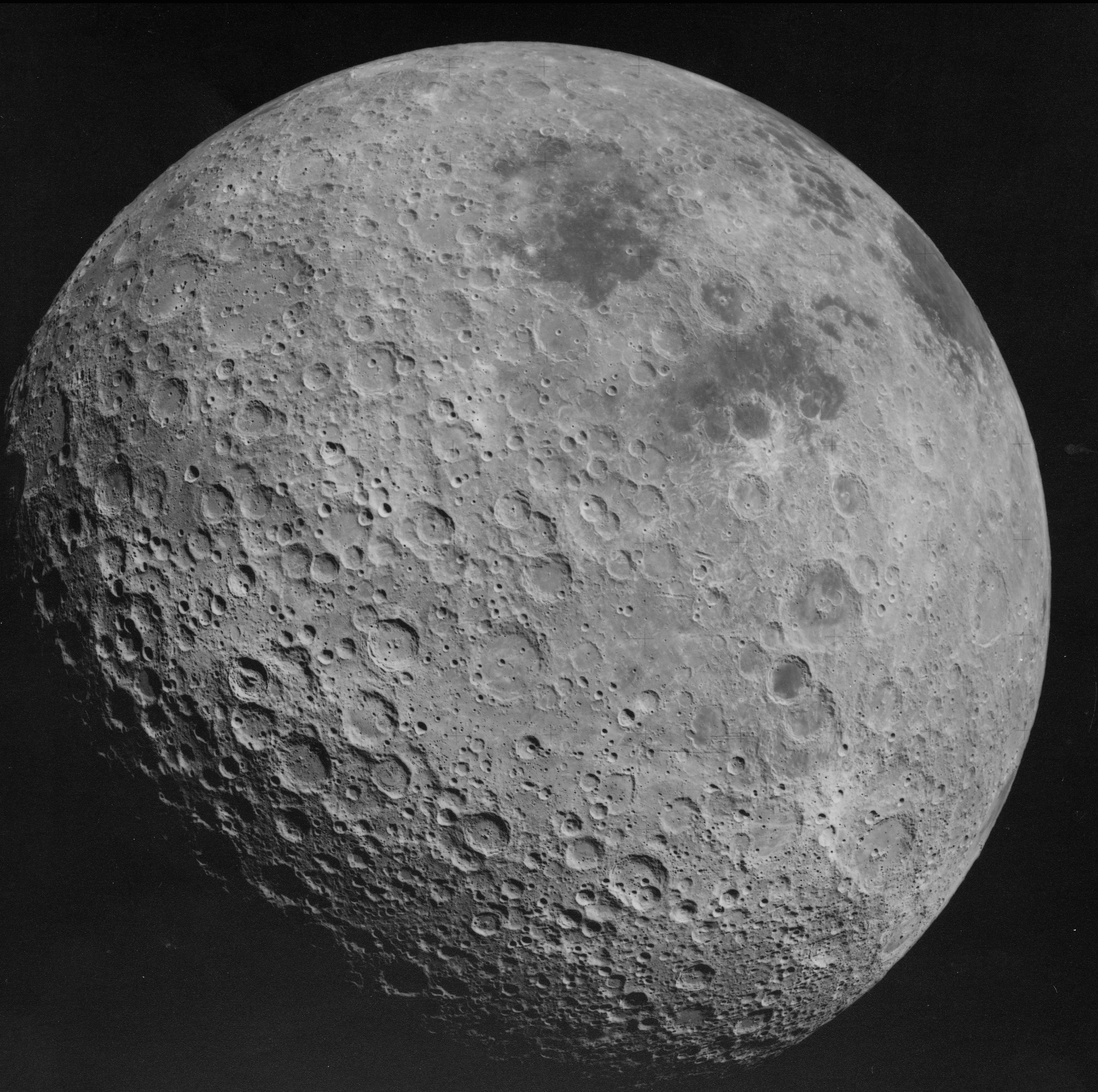
The far side of the Moon, with Mare Marginis and Mare Smythii visible, photographed by Apollo 16 in 1972. It is much more cratered than the near side of the Moon.

On 26 April 1962, NASA's Ranger 4 space probe became the first spacecraft to impact the far side of the Moon, although it failed to return any scientific data before impact.

The first truly comprehensive and detailed mapping survey of the far side was undertaken by the American uncrewed Lunar Orbiter program launched by NASA from 1966 to 1967. Most of the coverage of the far side was provided by the final probe in the series, Lunar Orbiter 5.

The far side was first seen directly by human eyes during the Apollo 8 mission in December, 1968. Astronaut William Anders described the view:

"The backside looks like a sand pile my kids have played in for some time. It's all beat up, no definition, just a lot of bumps and holes."

It has been seen directly by all 24 men who flew on Apollo 8 and Apollo 10 through Apollo 17 and the three men and one woman on Artemis II, and photographed by multiple lunar probes. Spacecraft passing behind the Moon were out of direct radio communication with the Earth, and had to wait until the orbit allowed transmission. During the Apollo missions, the main engine of the Service Module was fired when the vessel was behind the Moon, producing some tense moments in Mission Control before the craft reappeared.

Geologist-astronaut Harrison Schmitt, who became the last to step onto the Moon, had aggressively lobbied for Apollo 17's landing site to be on the far side of the Moon, targeting the lava-filled crater Tsiolkovskiy. Schmitt's ambitious proposal included a special communications satellite based on the existing TIROS satellites to be launched into a Farquhar–Lissajous halo orbit around the L2 point so as to maintain line-of-sight contact with the astronauts during their powered descent and lunar surface operations. NASA administrators rejected these plans on the grounds of added risk and lack of funding.

The idea of utilizing the Earth–Moon L_{2} for a communications satellite covering the Moon's far side has been realized, as China National Space Administration launched the Queqiao relay satellite in 2018. It has since been used for communications between the Chang'e 4 lander and Yutu-2 rover, which successfully landed in early 2019 on the lunar far side, and ground stations on the Earth. L2 is proposed to be "an ideal location" for a propellant depot as part of the proposed depot-based space transportation architecture.

=== Soft landing ===
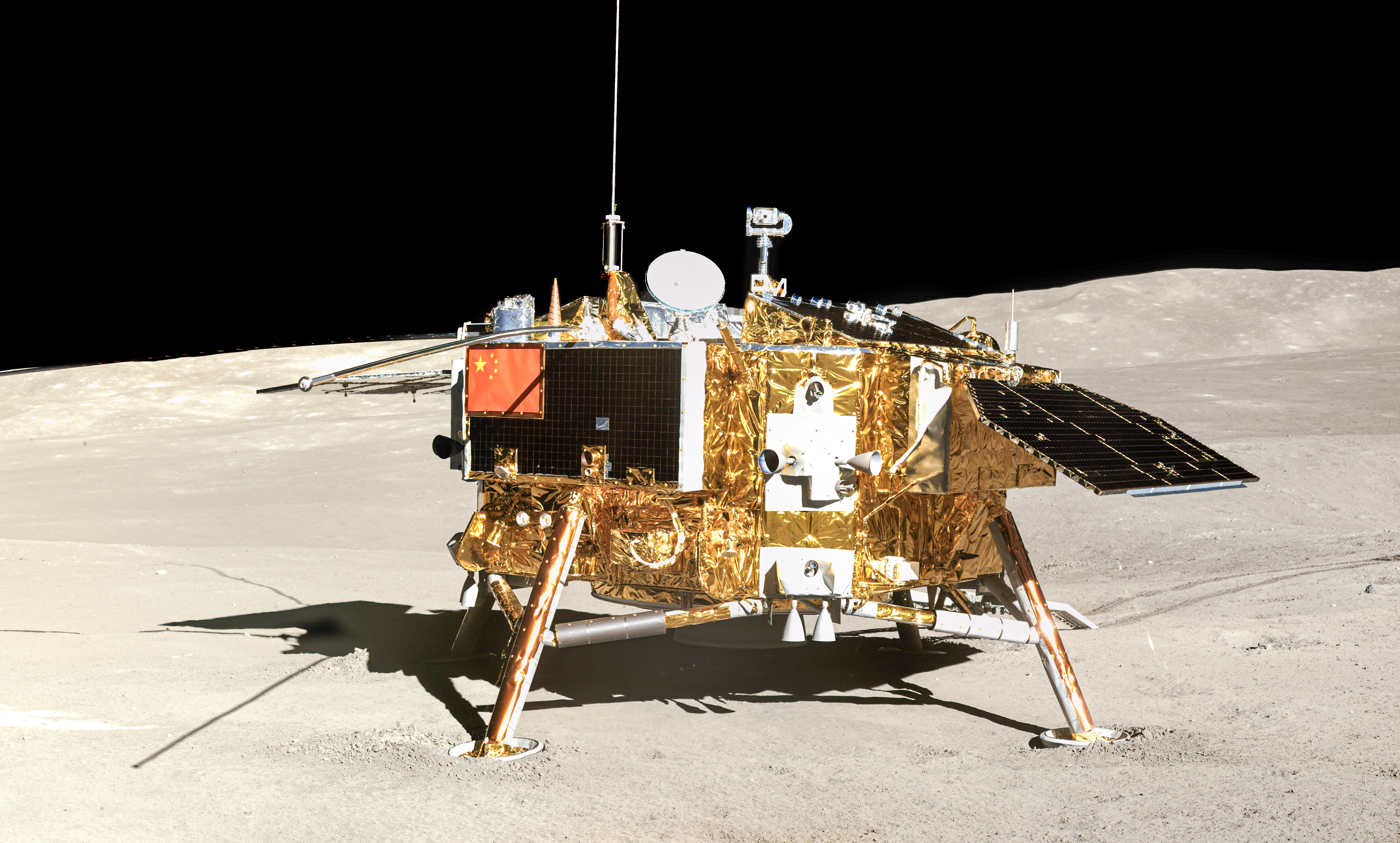
The Chang'e-4 lander imaged by the Yutu-2 rover on the lunar far side.

The China National Space Administration (CNSA)'s Chang'e 4 achieved the first ever soft landing on the lunar far side on 3 January 2019 and deployed the Yutu-2 lunar rover onto the lunar surface.

The craft included a lander equipped with a low-frequency radio spectrograph and geological research tools. The far side of the Moon provides a good environment for radio astronomy as interferences from the Earth are blocked by the Moon.

In February 2020, Chinese astronomers reported, for the first time, a high-resolution image of a lunar ejecta sequence, as well as direct analysis of its internal architecture. These were based on observations made by the Lunar Penetrating Radar (LPR) on board the Yutu-2 rover.

CNSA launched Chang'e 6 on 3 May 2024, which conducted the first lunar sample return from Apollo Basin on the far side of the Moon. It was CNSA's second lunar sample return mission, the first achieved by Chang'e 5 from the lunar near side four years earlier. It also carried a mini "Jinchan" rover to conduct infrared spectroscopy of lunar surface and imaged the Chang'e 6's lander on the lunar surface. The lander-ascender-rover combination was separated with the orbiter and returner before landing on 1 June 2024 at 22:23 UTC. It landed on the Moon's surface on 1 June 2024. The ascender was launched back to lunar orbit on 3 June 2024 at 23:38 UTC, carrying samples collected by the lander, and later completed another robotic rendezvous and docking in lunar orbit. The sample container was then transferred to the returner, which landed in Inner Mongolia on 25 June 2024, completing China's far side sample return mission.

The Lunar Surface Electromagnetics Experiment (LuSEE-Night) lander, a mission to soft land as early as 2026 a robotic observatory on the far side designed to measure electromagnetic waves from the early history of the universe is being developed by NASA and the United States Department of Energy.

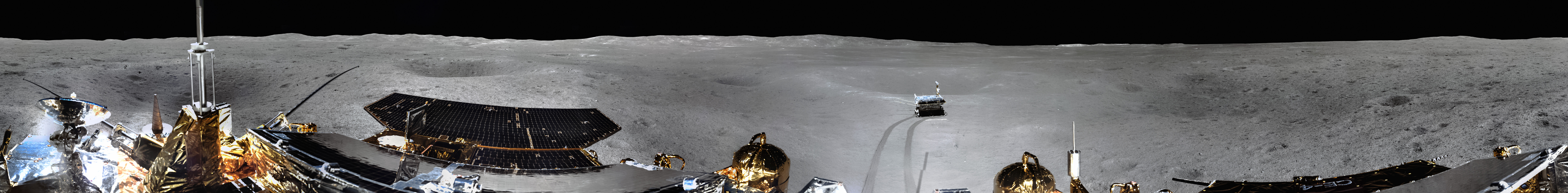
The first panorama from the far side of the Moon taken by Chang'e 4

== Potential uses and missions ==
Because the far side of the Moon is shielded from radio transmissions from the Earth, it is considered a good location for placing radio telescopes for use by astronomers. Small, bowl-shaped craters provide a natural formation for a stationary telescope similar to Arecibo in Puerto Rico. For much larger-scale telescopes, the 100-kilometer-diameter (60 mi) crater Daedalus is situated near the center of the far side, and the 3-kilometer-high (2 mi) rim would help to block stray communications from orbiting satellites. Another potential candidate for a radio telescope is the Saha crater.

Before deploying radio telescopes to the far side, several problems must be overcome. The fine lunar dust can contaminate equipment, vehicles, and space suits. The conducting materials used for the radio dishes must also be carefully shielded against the effects of solar flares. Finally, the area around the telescopes must be protected against contamination by other radio sources.

The L_{2} Lagrange point of the Earth–Moon system is located about 62,800 km (39,000 mi) above the far side, which has also been proposed as a location for a future radio telescope which would perform a Lissajous orbit about the Lagrangian point.

One of the NASA missions to the Moon under study would send a sample-return lander to the South Pole–Aitken basin, the location of a major impact event that created a formation nearly 2,400 km (1,500 mi) across. The force of this impact has created a deep penetration into the lunar surface, and a sample returned from this site could be analyzed for information concerning the interior of the Moon.

Because the near side is partly shielded from the solar wind by the Earth, the far side maria are expected to have the highest concentration of helium-3 on the surface of the Moon. This isotope is relatively rare on the Earth, but has good potential for use as a fuel in fusion reactors. Proponents of lunar settlement have cited the presence of this material as a reason for developing a Moon base.

== Named features ==
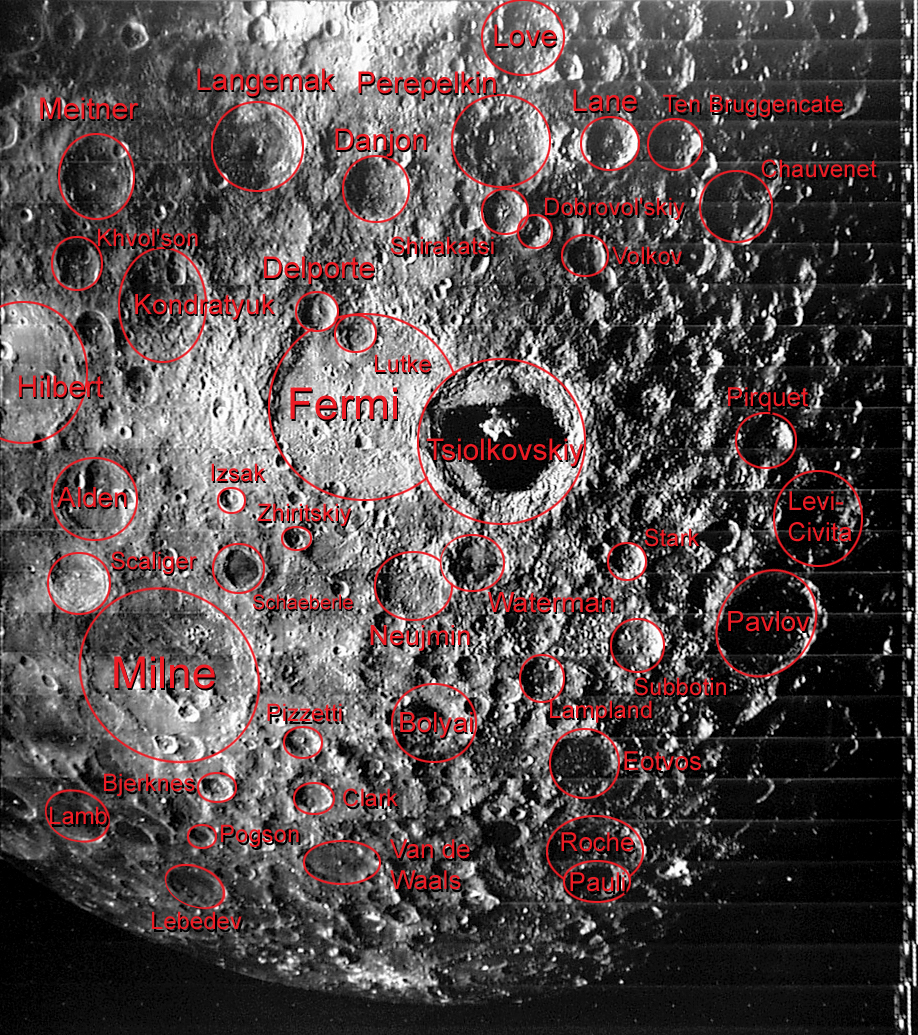
Some of the features of the geography of the far side of the Moon are labeled in this image

- Aitken (crater)
- Amici (crater)
- Anuchin (crater)
- Apollo (crater)
- Avogadro (crater)
- Bel'kovich (crater)
- Belopol'skiy (crater)
- Bergstrand (crater)
- Berkner (crater)
- Birkhoff (crater)
- Bjerknes (lunar crater)
- Bok (lunar crater)
- Campbell (lunar crater)
- Cantor (crater)
- Carnot (crater)
- Carroll (crater)
- Cassegrain (crater)
- Chandler (crater)
- Chappell (crater)
- Chernyshev (crater)
- Comrie (crater)
- Coulomb-Sarton Basin
- Crookes (crater)
- d'Alembert (crater)
- Daedalus (crater)
- Davisson (crater)
- Debus (crater)
- Delporte (crater)
- Dyson (crater)
- Ellerman (crater)
- Emden (crater)
- Esnault-Pelterie (crater)
- Fermi (crater)
- Finsen (crater)
- Fleming (crater)
- Fowler (crater)
- Fridman (crater)
- Ganskiy (crater)
- Gerasimovich (crater)
- Gullstrand (crater)
- Hayn (crater)
- Hegu (crater)
- Hertzsprung (crater)
- H. G. Wells (crater)
- Hippocrates (lunar crater)
- Houzeau (crater)
- Icarus (crater)
- Integrity (crater)
- Ioffe (crater)
- Izsak (crater)
- Jenner (crater)
- Kamerlingh Onnes (crater)
- Kirkwood (crater)
- Klute (crater)
- Kolhörster (crater)
- Komarov (crater)
- Korolev (lunar crater)
- Kovalevskaya (crater)
- Krasovskiy (crater)
- Kugler (crater)
- Kulik (crater)
- Lamb (crater)
- Lacus Luxuriae
- Lacus Oblivionis
- Lander (crater)
- Langevin (crater)
- Lebedev (crater)
- Leibnitz (crater)
- Lucretius (crater)
- Lunar south pole
- Maksutov (crater)
- McKellar (crater)
- Mare Australe
- Mare Frigoris
- Mare Humboldtianum
- Mare Ingenii
- Mare Moscoviense
- Mare Orientale
- Mendeleev (crater)
- Michelson (crater)
- Montes Cordillera
- Montes Rook
- Mons Tai
- Nicholson (lunar crater)
- Nishina (crater)
- Ohm (crater)
- Oppenheimer (crater)
- Oresme (crater)
- Pannekoek (crater)
- Paraskevopoulos (crater)
- Parenago (crater)
- Patsaev (crater)
- Perrine (crater)
- Pettit (lunar crater)
- Pirquet (crater)
- Pogson (crater)
- Priestley (lunar crater)
- Quetelet (crater)
- Rowland (crater)
- Sarton (crater)
- Schlesinger (crater)
- Shaler (crater)
- Shternberg (crater)
- Shuleykin (crater)
- Sikorsky (crater)
- Sniadecki (crater)
- Sommerfeld (crater)
- South Pole–Aitken basin
- Statio Tianhe (Chang'e 4 landing site)
- Stebbins (crater)
- Stoletov (crater)
- Sverdrup (crater)
- Tianjin (crater)
- Tikhov (lunar crater)
- Titov (crater)
- Tsander (crater)
- Tsinger (crater)
- Tsiolkovskiy (crater)
- Tyndall (lunar crater)
- Vallis Bouvard
- Vallis Inghirami
- van't Hoff (crater)
- Van de Graaff (crater)
- Van der Waals (crater)
- Vavilov (crater)
- Vertregt (crater)
- Virtanen (crater)
- Volkov (crater)
- Von Kármán (lunar crater)
- Von Neumann (crater)
- Von Zeipel (crater)
- Wan-Hoo (crater)
- Wiener (crater)
- Wright (lunar crater)
- Yamamoto (crater)
- Zhinyu (crater)

== Far side of Earth ==
While Earth is not tidally locked to the Moon, and therefore does not keep the same face turned away from the Moon, Earth has a "far side" to the Moon, which features a "far side" tidal bulge pulled to the Moon.

== See also ==
- Geology of the Moon
- Giant-impact hypothesis
- Near side of the Moon
