= List of RAeS medal recipients =

This is a list of recipients of medals awarded by the Royal Aeronautical Society.

== Individual medal recipients ==
=== Gold Medal recipients ===
- 1909 - Wilbur and Orville Wright
- 1910 - Octave Chanute
- 1945 - Air Cdre Frank Whittle
- 1949 - Sydney Camm
- 1950 - Sir Geoffrey de Havilland
- 1952 - Theodore von Kármán
- 1955 - Ernest Hives, 1st Baron Hives - "for his outstanding work in the field of aircraft propulsion.".
- 1957 - Robert Lickley
- 1958 - Stuart Davies
- 1959 - Marcel Dassault
- 1960 - Sir Frederick Handley Page
- 1964 - Ronald Eric Bishop
- 1967 - Stanley Hooker
- 1977 - Sir Frederick Page
- 1977 - George Lee
- 1983 - Geoffrey Lilley
- 1986 - Ralph Hooper
- 1986 - Sir Donald Spiers
- 2009 - Henry McDonald
- 2012 - Elon Musk
- 2014 - Dr Gordon McConnell
- 2015 - Professor Richard J Parker
- 2024 - Sue Partridge, FREng

=== Silver Medal recipients ===
Winners of the annual Silver Medal of the Royal Aeronautical Society

- 1962 - Dietrich Küchemann
- 1967 - Charles Joy
- 1971 - John Argyris
- 1991 - Roy Dommett
- 2005 - Professor David Southwood
- 2010 - Frank De Winne
- 2011 - Professor Terence Jones
- 2012 - Robert Smith
- 2013 - Professor John Denton
- 2014 - Mr Frank Ogilvie
- 2014 - Mr Robert Saia
- 2015 - G. Satheesh Reddy

== Team medal recipients ==
=== Team Gold Medalists ===
- 2004 - SpaceShipOne
- 2005 - Airbus A380 Wing Design Team
- 2007 - BERP rotor development team
- 2008 - Trent 900 Engineering Team
- 2009 - Vectored-thrust Aircraft Advanced Control (VAAC) Team
- 2009 - Jules Verne ATV Operations Team
- 2014 - Project Zero Team
- 2015 - Rosetta Mission Team
- 2019 - Chang'e 4 Lunar Landing Mission Team

=== Team Silver Medalists ===
- 2005 - Huygens project team
- 2008 - Cranfield Aerospace X-48B UAV
- 2010 - Mantis UAV project team
- 2011 - HYLAS-1 team
- 2012 - CAMPS development team
- 2013 - ASTRAEA Team
- 2014 - Team Taranis
- 2015 - The Beagle 2 Mars Mission Engineering Team
