= Zhinyu (crater) =

Lunar impact crater

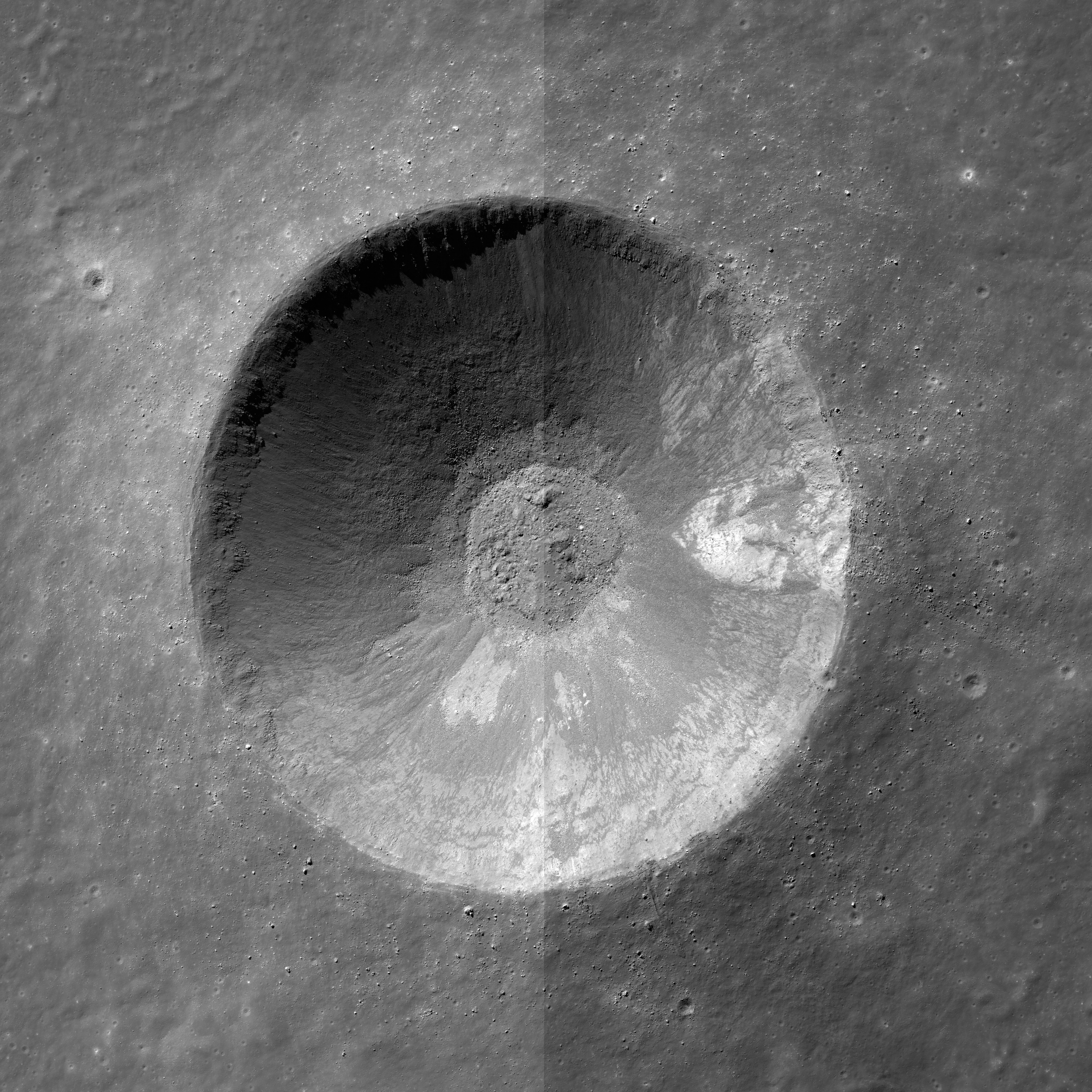
- LRO mosaic
- Coordinates: 45.34°S 176.15°E
- Diameter: 3.8 km
- Depth: Unknown
- Eponym: Constellation name in ancient Chinese star map

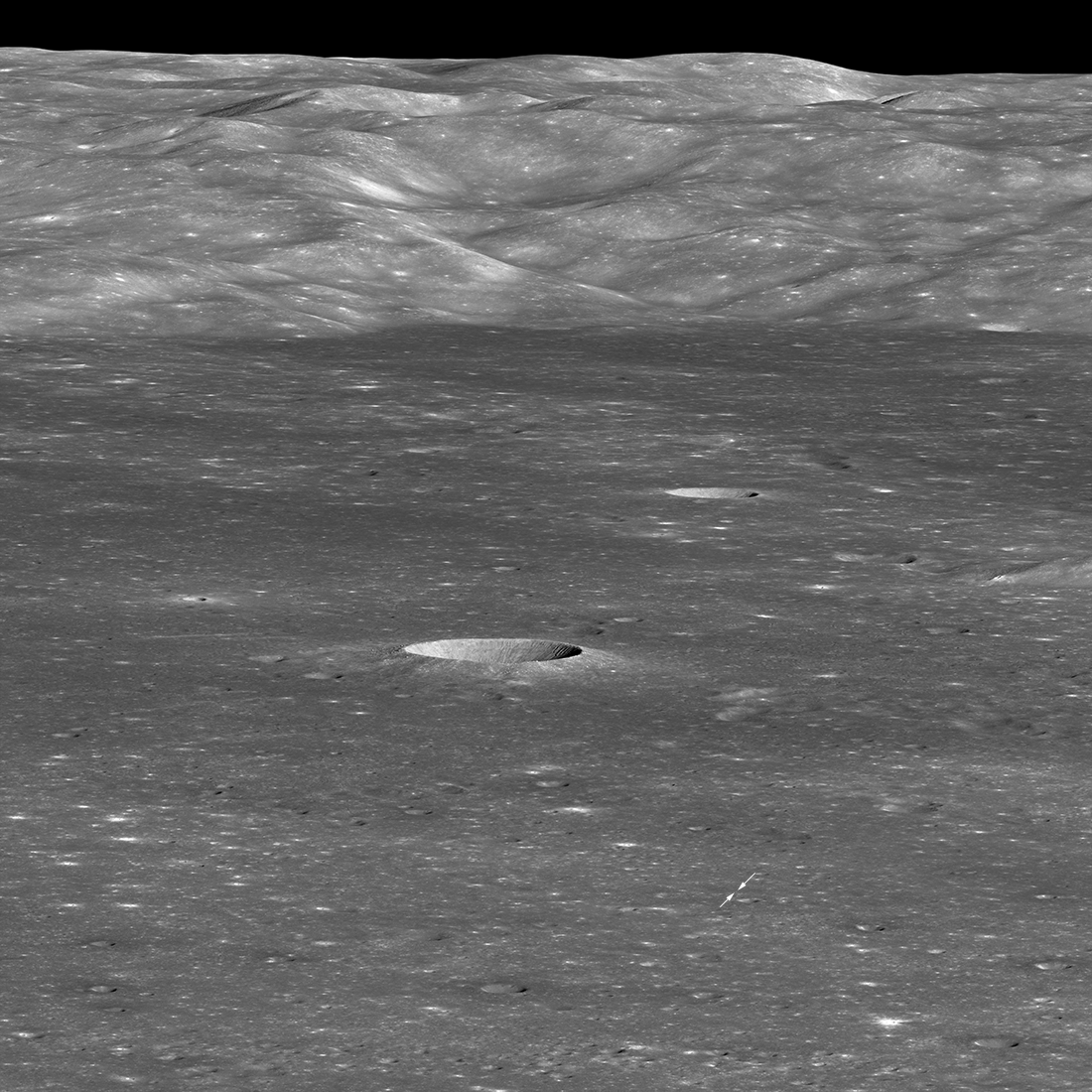
Oblique view with Zhinyu at center, and the Chang'e 4 lander and rover indicated by arrows

Zhinyu is a lunar impact crater that is located within Von Kármán crater on the far side of the Moon. The crater is located west of the landing site of the Chinese Chang'e 4 lander. The best fit model of the crater impactor suggest a projectile with a diameter of 224 m and a velocity of 17 km/s.

The crater's name was approved by the IAU on 4 February 2019. It is named after the Chinese mythical figure Zhinü, (Note: traditional Chinese: 織女; simplified Chinese: 织女; pinyin: Zhīnǚ) the "weaver girl" from the traditional myth The Cowherd and the Weaver Girl, as well as an ancient Chinese constellation.

This is a young crater with a diameter of about 3.8 km and a depth of around 800 m. This impact penetrated the 320 m deep basalt mare deposits in the Von Kármán crater, thus providing information about the subsurface deposits. The ejecta from the Zhinyu crater varies radially by distance, suggesting a heterogeneous composition. It displays three layers of separate deposits from the mare, but the composition of the layers is similar and may have a common origin.
