= Tianjin (crater) =

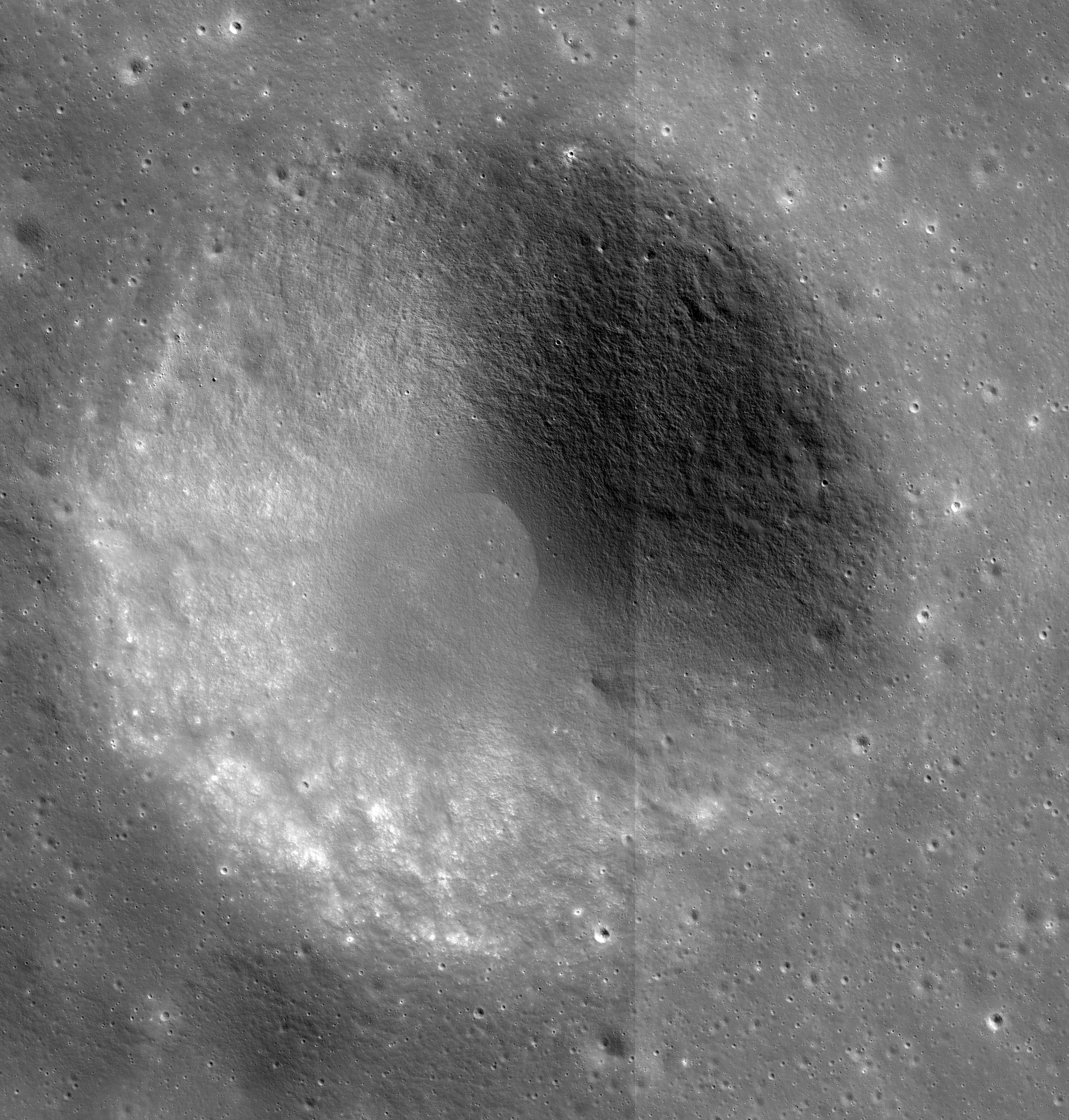
- LRO mosaic
- Coordinates: 44.93°S 178.81°E
- Diameter: 3.9 km
- Depth: Unknown
- Eponym: Constellation name in ancient Chinese star map

Tianjin is a lunar impact crater that is located within Von Kármán crater on the far side of the Moon. The crater is located northeast of the landing site of the Chinese Chang'e 4 lander.

The crater's name was approved by the IAU on 4 February 2019. It is based on an ancient Chinese constellation of the same name (天津), which is a character in the traditional myth The Cowherd and the Weaver Girl. The literal meaning is “Celestial Ford”, the Milky Way is known as “Celestial River” (天河) in China.
