= Oresme (crater) =

Crater on the Moon

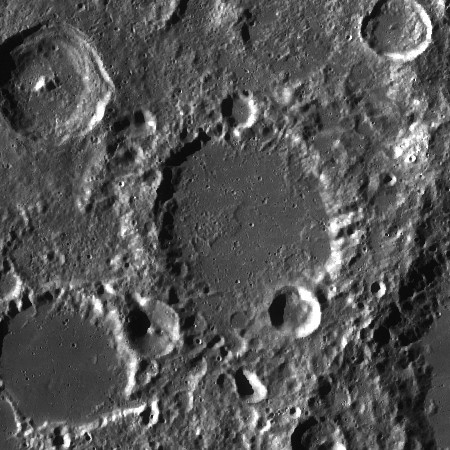
- LRO image
- Coordinates: 42.4°S 169.2°E
- Diameter: 76 km
- Depth: Unknown
- Colongitude: 192° at sunrise
- Eponym: Nicole Oresme

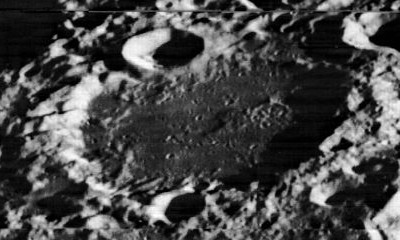
Oblique Lunar Orbiter 2 view, facing south

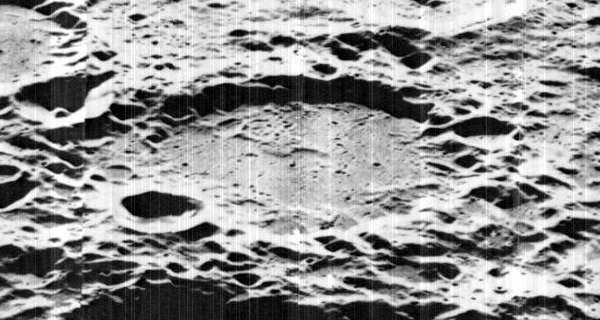
Oblique Lunar Orbiter 5 image, facing west

Oresme is a crater on the Moon's far side. It lies just to the west-northwest of the larger Von Kármán. To the southwest of Oresme is Chrétien, and to the northwest is the Mare Ingenii. This crater was believed to have formed during the Nectarian epoch, about 4 billion years ago.

This crater has a considerably damaged outer rim that forms an uneven, irregular ring about the interior floor. By contrast, the floor of Oresme is a relatively level, featureless surface that is marked only by a few tiny craters and low topological features. The rim is cut across along the southeast by the satellite crater Oresme K, and a smaller crater lies along the northern rim.

Prior to formal naming in 1970 by the IAU, the crater was known as Crater 430.

== Satellite craters ==
By convention these features are identified on lunar maps by placing the letter on the side of the crater midpoint that is closest to Oresme.

Oresme	Latitude	Longitude	Diameter
K	43.9° S	170.0° E	24 km
Q	44.0° S	167.2° E	23 km
U	41.6° S	164.8° E	84 km
V	40.5° S	165.6° E	51 km
