= Hegu (crater) =

Lunar impact crater

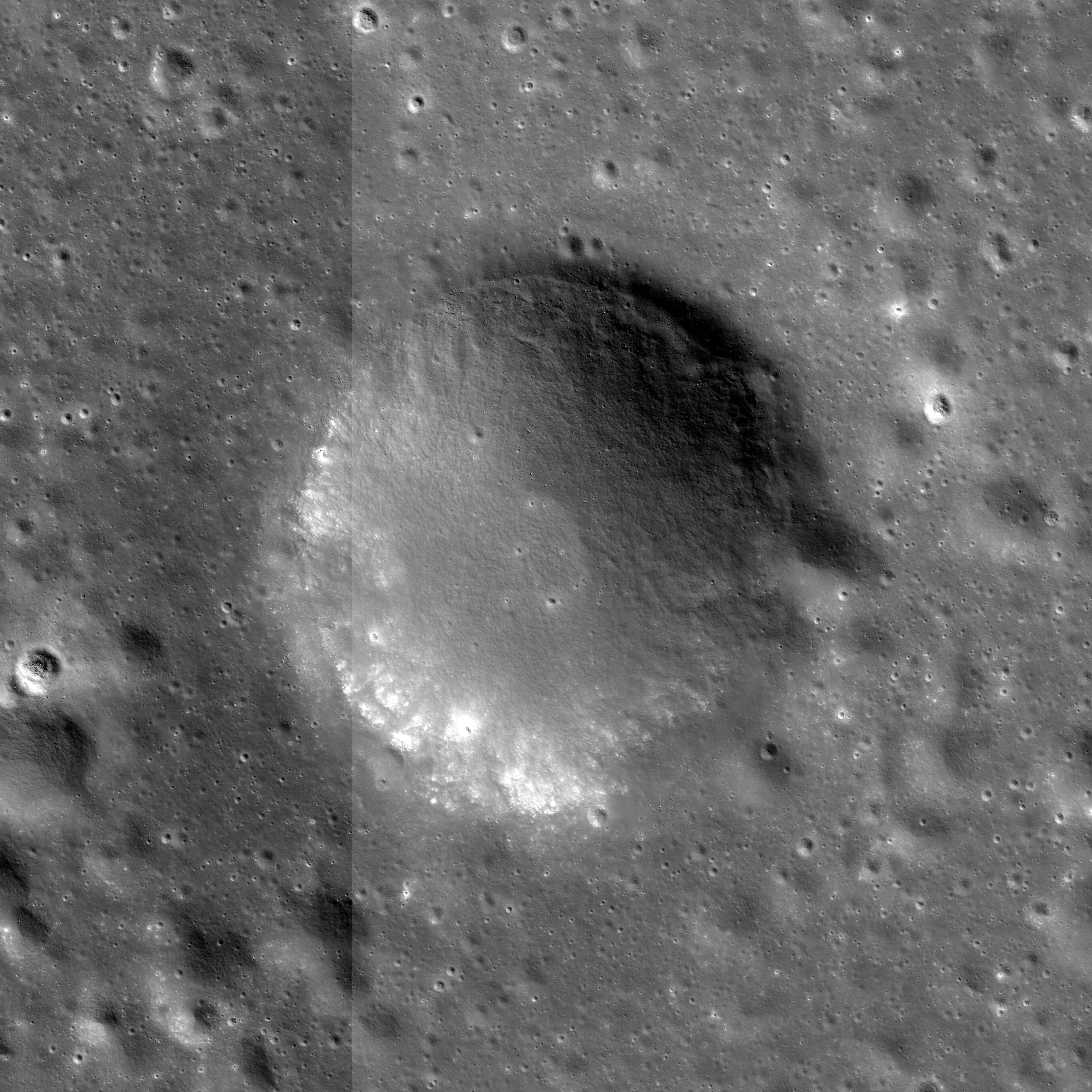
- LRO mosaic
- Coordinates: 46.3°S 177.57°E
- Diameter: 2.2km
- Depth: Unknown
- Eponym: Constellation name in ancient Chinese star map

Hegu is a lunar impact crater that is located within Von Kármán crater on the far side of the Moon. The crater is located south of the landing site of the Chinese Chang'e 4 lander.

The crater's name was approved by the IAU on 4 February 2019. It is based on an ancient Chinese constellation of the same name (河鼓).
