= Von Kármán (lunar crater) =

Lunar impact crater

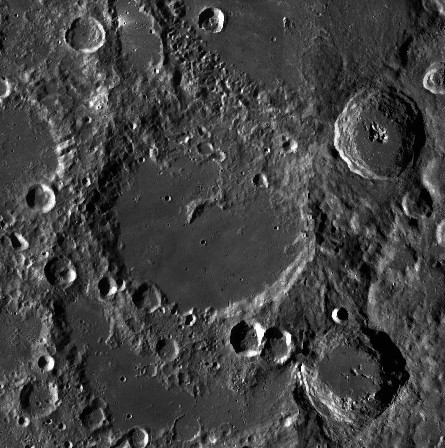
- LRO image
- Coordinates: 44.45°S 176.25°E
- Diameter: 186.35 km (115.79 mi)
- Colongitude: 188° at sunrise
- Formation: Pre-Nectarian
- Eponym: Theodore von Kármán

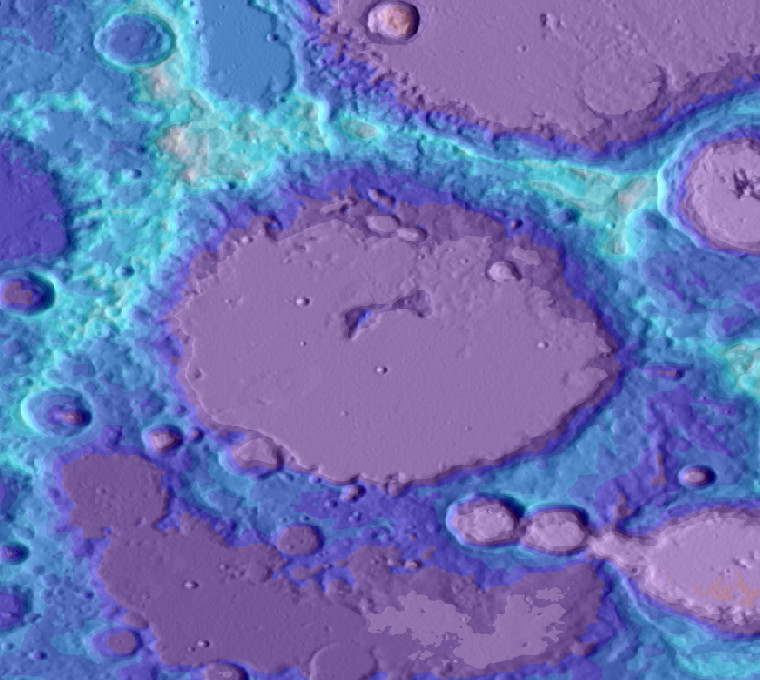
Shaded relief topographic map of the crater.

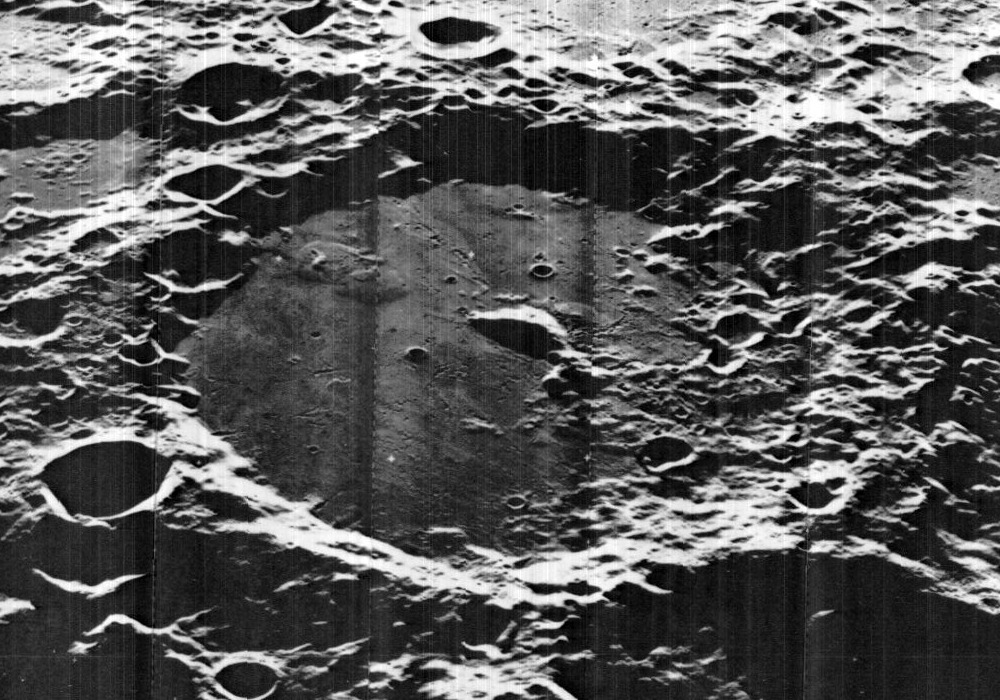
Oblique Lunar Orbiter 5 image, looking west; north sector of crater buried by Leibnitz ejecta

Von Kármán is a large lunar impact crater that is located in the southern hemisphere on the far side of the Moon. The crater is about 186 km (116 mi) in diameter and lies within an immense impact feature known as the South Pole–Aitken basin of roughly 2,500 km (1,600 mi) in diameter and 13 km (8.1 mi) deep. Von Kármán is the site of the first soft-landing on the lunar far side by the Chinese Chang'e 4 spacecraft on 3 January 2019.

The crater is named after Hungarian-American aeronautical engineer Theodore von Kármán. Prior to formal naming in 1970 by the IAU, the crater was known as Crater 434.

== Overview ==
The northern third of this feature is overlain by the rim and outer rampart of the walled plain designated Leibnitz, forming a deep indentation in the formation. The remainder of the outer wall is roughly circular in shape, although it is irregular and heavily worn by subsequent impacts.

The interior of Von Kármán has been subjected to flooding by lava flows after the original crater formed, leaving the southern portion of the floor nearly flat. This surface has a lower albedo than the surrounding terrain, and is nearly as dark as the interior of Leibnitz. There is a central peak at the location where the midpoint of the original Von Kármán was formed, which joins with the rougher surface in the northern part of the crater. The spectra of this peak fits a olivine-bearing noritic gabbro mineralogy, which originated from a depth of 18.0 to 30.3 km.

In addition to Leibnitz to the north, the crater Oresme is located to the west-northwest, and Finsen lies to the northeast on the edge of Leibnitz's rim. Nearly attached to the southeast rim is the unusual figure-eight-shaped formation Von Kármán L. Directly to the east of this is the crater Alder.

== Exploration and cotton seeds sprouting ==
On 3 January 2019, the Chinese spacecraft Chang'e 4 landed inside the crater Von Kármán, becoming the first spacecraft to soft-land on the far side of the Moon. The site holds symbolic meaning and scientific value as Theodore von Kármán (1881–1963) was the PhD advisor of Qian Xuesen, the founder of the Chinese space program.

Chang'e 4 took cotton seeds on its mission, and on 15 January 2019, China announced that cotton seeds had sprouted, the first "truly otherworldly plant in history".

On 4 February 2019 the IAU approved the name of the landing site as Statio Tianhe. The central peak of Von Kármán, to the northwest of the landing site, was named Mons Tai. Three small craters were also named: Hegu is south of the landing site, Zhinyu is to the west, and Tianjin is to the northeast.

== Satellite craters ==
By convention these features are identified on lunar maps by placing the letter on the side of the crater midpoint that is closest to Von Kármán.

Von Kármán	Latitude	Longitude	Diameter
L	47.7° S	177.9° E	29 km
M	47.2° S	176.2° E	225 km
R	45.8° S	170.8° E	28 km

Von Kármán M dates to the Pre-Nectarian period of the lunar geologic timescale.
