= Mons Tai =

Mountain on the Moon

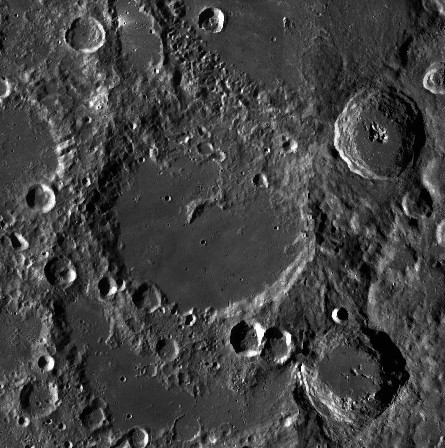

Highest point
- Listing: Lunar mountains
- Coordinates: 44.56°S 175.83°E

Geography

Mons Tai is a mountain of the surface of the Moon. It is named after Tai Shan, a mountain in China's Shandong province just south of Beijing. Its diameter is 24 km. The name was given in connection with the Chang'e 4 mission, the lander of which has landed within this crater.
