= South Pole–Aitken basin =

Large impact crater on the Moon

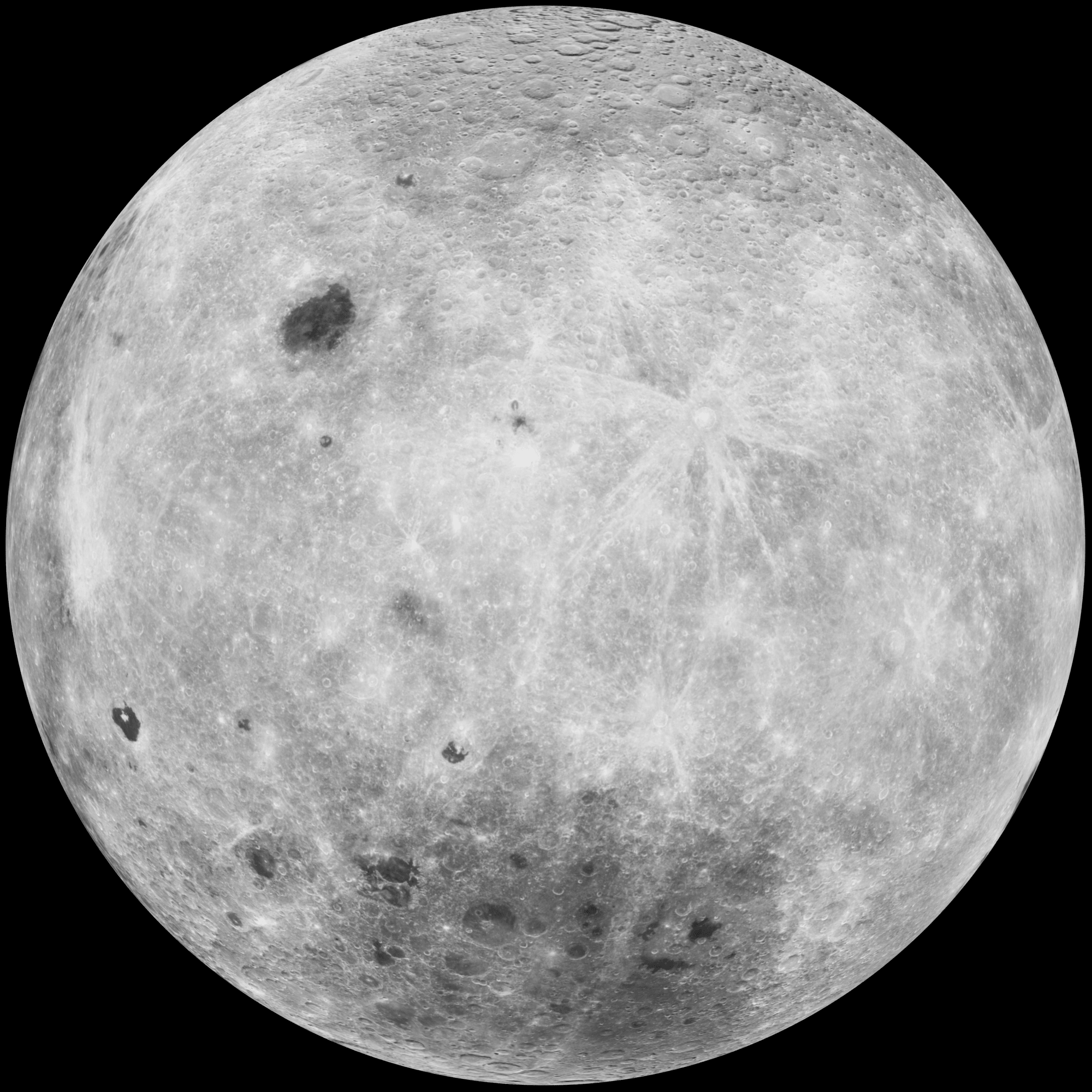
- The South Pole–Aitken basin is the darker area at the bottom of this image of the far side of the Moon
- Location: The Moon
- Coordinates: 53°S 169°W
- Diameter: c. 2,500 km (1,600 mi)
- Depth: c. 8.2 km (5.1 mi)
- Impactor diameter: c. 200 km
- Age: c. 4.338 billion years

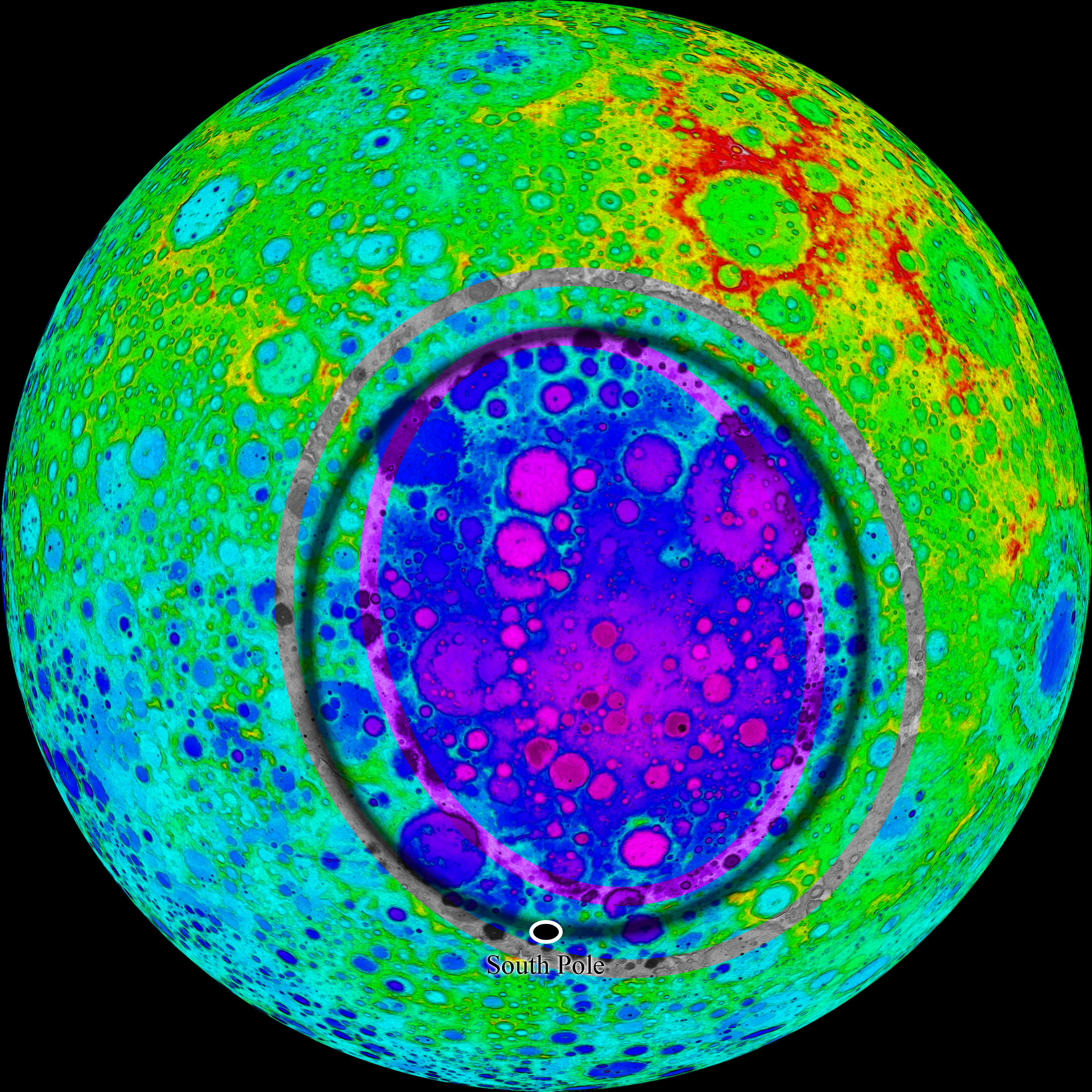
Topographic map of the South Pole–Aitken basin based on Kaguya data. Red represents high elevation, purple represents low elevation. The purple and grey elliptical rings trace the inner and outer walls of the basin. (The black ring is an old artifact of the image.)

The South Pole–Aitken basin (SPA Basin, /ˈeɪtkɪn/) is an immense, ancient impact crater on the far side of the Moon. At roughly 2,500 km (1,600 mi) in diameter and between 6.2 and 8.2 km (3.9–5.1 mi) deep, it is one of the largest known impact craters in the Solar System. It is the largest, oldest, and deepest basin recognized on the Moon. It is estimated that it was formed during the pre-Nectarian epoch, with radiometric dating of lunar zircons proposed to originate from the basin suggesting a precise age of 4.338 billion years. It was named for two features on opposite sides of the basin: the lunar South Pole at one end and the crater Aitken on the northern end. The outer rim of this basin can be seen from Earth as a huge mountain chain located on the Moon's southern limb, sometimes informally called "Leibnitz mountains".

On 3 January 2019, the Chinese spacecraft Chang'e 4 landed in the basin, specifically within a crater called Von Kármán. In May 2019, scientists announced that a large mass of material had been identified deep within the crater. Chang'e 6 collected a sample from this crater, specifically within the Apollo basin.

== Discovery ==
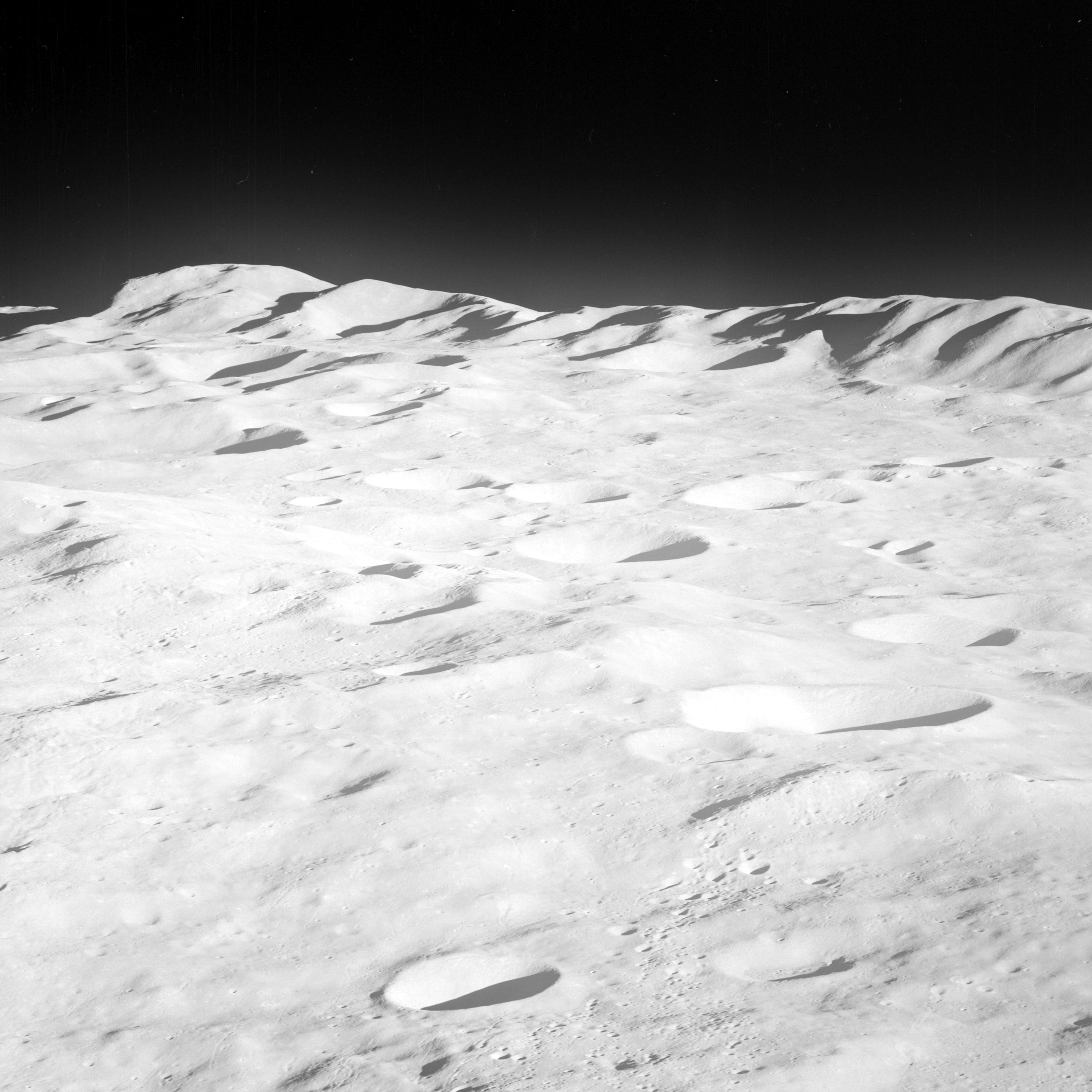
Apollo 8 photograph showing the mountains along the northern rim of the basin

The existence of a giant far side basin was suspected as early as 1962 based on early Soviet probe images (namely Luna 3 and Zond 3), but it was not until wide-field photographs taken by the US Lunar Orbiter program became available in 1966 that geologists recognized its true size. Laser altimeter data obtained during the Apollo 15 and 16 missions showed that the northern portion of this basin was very deep, but since these data were only available along the near-equatorial ground tracks of the orbiting command and service modules, the topography of the rest of the basin remained unknown. The geologic map showing the northern half of this basin and with its edge depicted was published in 1978 by the United States Geological Survey. Little was known about the basin until the 1990s, when the spacecraft Galileo and Clementine visited the Moon. Multispectral images obtained from these missions showed that this basin contains more FeO and Titanium dioxide than typical lunar highlands, and hence has a darker appearance. The topography of the basin was mapped in its entirety for the first time using altimeter data and the analysis of stereo image pairs taken during the Clementine mission. Most recently, the composition of this basin has been further constrained by the analysis of data obtained from a gamma-ray spectrometer that was on board the Lunar Prospector mission.

== Physical characteristics ==
The South Pole–Aitken basin is the largest, deepest and oldest basin recognized on the Moon. The lowest elevations of the Moon (about −9 km) are located within the South Pole–Aitken basin. The Moon's tallest mountains are found around the basin's rim – they have summit elevations of up to 8.5 km and base-to-peak heights of up to 7 km. Because of this basin's great size, the crust at this locale is expected to be thinner than typical as a result of the large amount of material that was excavated due to an impact. Crustal thickness maps constructed using the Moon's topography and gravity field imply a thickness of about 30 km beneath the floor of this basin, in comparison to 60–80 km around it and the global average of around 50 km.

The composition of the basin, as estimated from the Galileo, Clementine, and Lunar Prospector missions, appears to be different from typical highland regions. Most importantly, none of the samples obtained from the American Apollo and Russian Luna missions, nor the handful of identified lunar meteorites, have comparable compositions. The orbital data indicate that the floor of the basin has slightly elevated abundances of iron, titanium, and thorium. In terms of mineralogy, the basin floor is much richer in clinopyroxene and orthopyroxene than the surrounding highlands, which are largely anorthositic. Several possibilities exist for this distinctive chemical signature: one is that it might simply represent lower crustal materials that are somewhat richer in iron, titanium and thorium than the upper crust; another is that the composition reflects the widespread distribution of ponds of iron-rich basalts, similar to those that make up the lunar maria; alternatively, the rocks in the basin could contain a component from the lunar mantle if the basin excavated all the way through the crust; and, finally, it is possible that a large portion of the lunar surface surrounding the basin was melted during the impact event, and differentiation of this impact melt sheet could have given rise to additional geochemical anomalies. Complicating the matter is the possibility that several processes have contributed to the basin's anomalous geochemical signature. Ultimately, the origin of the anomalous composition of the basin is not known with certainty and will likely require a sample return mission to determine.

In 1994, the Clementine Mission detected several regions of water ice within the basin. These areas were mapped in greater detail by the Lunar Prospector mission in 1998 and several missions since then.

== Exploration ==
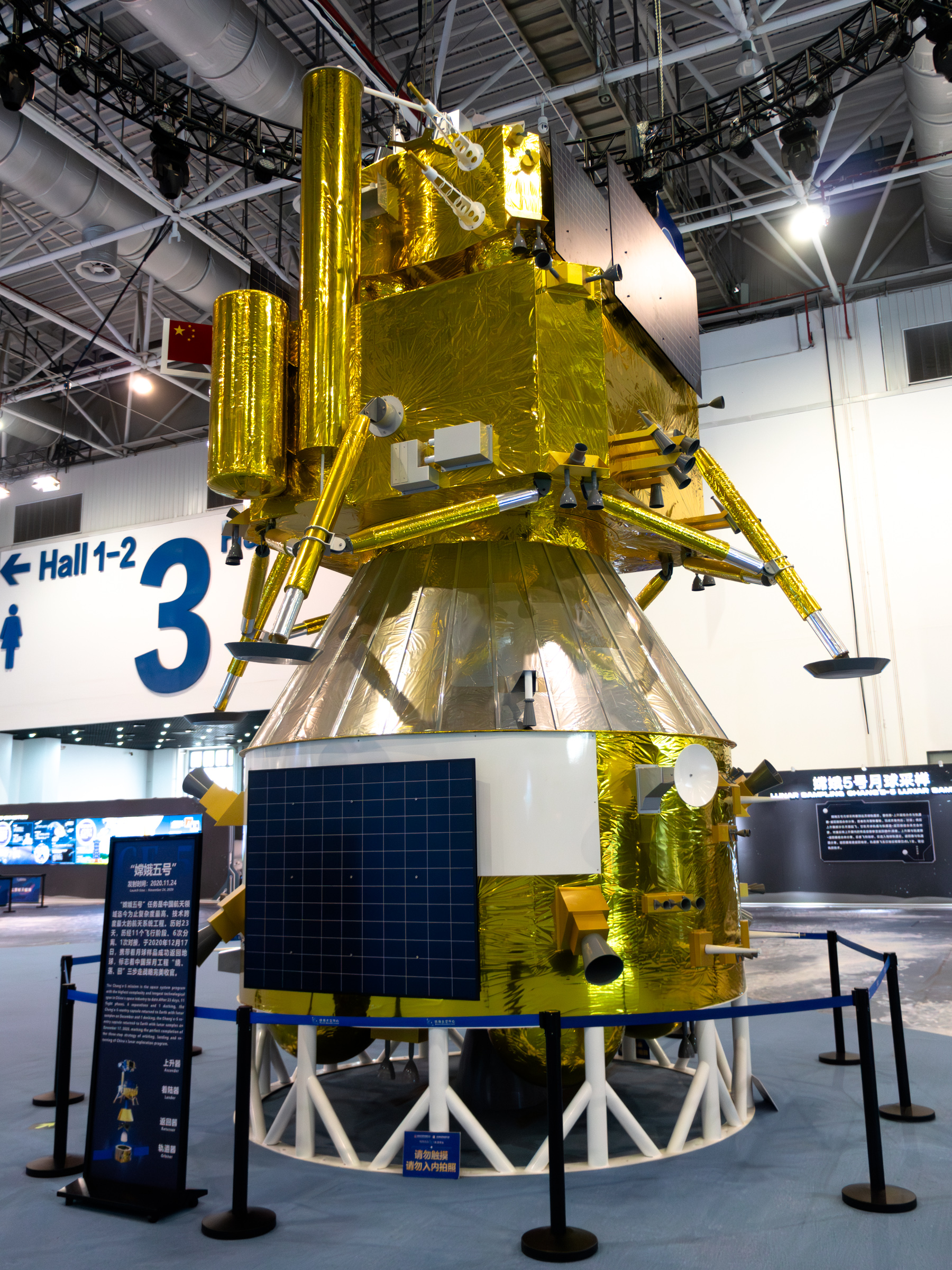
Chang'e-5/6 spacecraft full-stack full-scale mockup

China sent Chang'e 6 on 3 May 2024, which conducted the first lunar sample return from Apollo Basin on the far side of the Moon. This is China's second lunar sample return mission, the first was achieved by Chang'e 5 from the lunar near side four years earlier. It also carried a Chinese rover called Jinchan to conduct infrared spectroscopy of lunar surface and imaged Chang'e 6 lander on lunar surface. The lander-ascender-rover combination was separated with the orbiter and returner before landing on 1 June 2024 at 22:23 UTC. It landed on the Moon's surface on 1 June 2024. The ascender was launched back to lunar orbit on 3 June 2024 at 23:38 UTC, carrying samples collected by the lander, and later completed another robotic rendezvous and docking in lunar orbit. The sample container was then transferred to the returner, which landed on Inner Mongolia on 25 June 2024, completing China's far side extraterrestrial sample return mission.

== Origin ==
Simulations of near vertical impacts show that the bolide ought to have excavated vast amounts of mantle materials from depths as great as 200 km below the surface. However, observations thus far do not favor a mantle composition for this basin and crustal thickness maps seem to indicate the presence of about 10 kilometers of crustal materials beneath this basin's floor. This has suggested to some that the basin was not formed by a typical high-velocity impact, but may instead have been formed by a low-velocity projectile around 200 km in diameter (compared to the 10 km diameter Chicxulub impactor) that hit at a low angle (about 30 degrees or less), and hence did not dig very deeply into the Moon. Putative evidence for this comes from the high elevations north-east of the rim of the South Pole–Aitken basin that might represent ejecta from such an oblique impact. The impact theory would also account for magnetic anomalies on the Moon.

== See also ==
- Geology of the Moon
- Lunar craters
- Lunar water
- Animation of the Impact
