= Comet du Toit =

Comet du Toit may refer to any of the five comets discovered by South African astronomer, Daniel du Toit, below:

- 57P/du Toit–Neujmin–Delporte
- 66P/du Toit
- 79P/du Toit–Hartley
- C/1945 L1 (du Toit)
- C/1945 X1 (du Toit)
