= NGC 5523 =

Galaxy in the constellation of Bootes

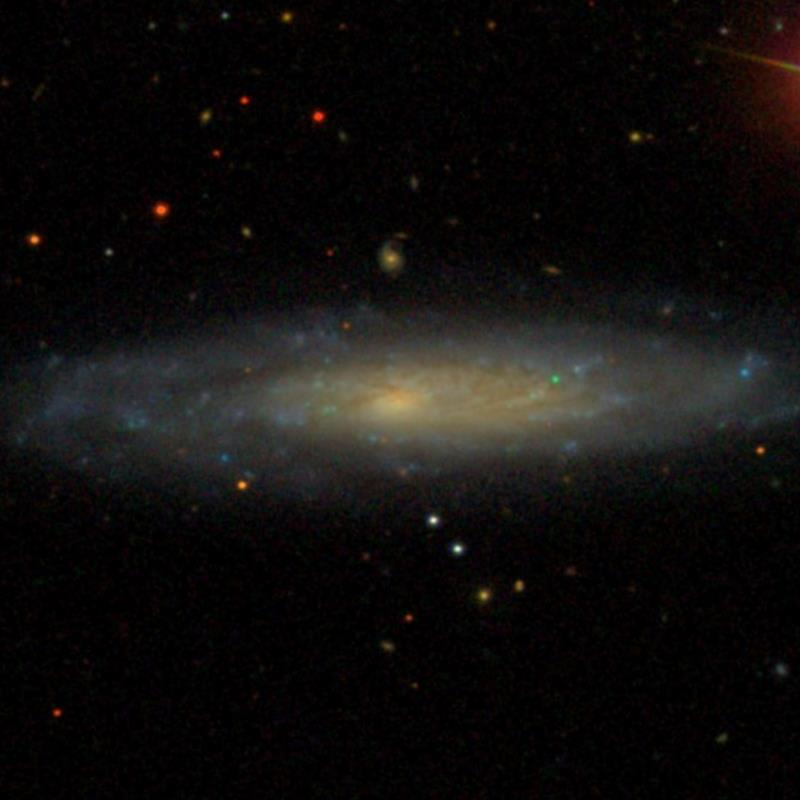
- SDSS image of NGC 5523

Observation data (J2000 epoch)
- Constellation: Boötes
- Right ascension: 14^{h} 14^{m} 52.31^{s}
- Declination: +25° 19′ 3.41″
- Redshift: 0.003488
- Heliocentric radial velocity: 1044 km/s
- Galactocentric velocity: 1093 km/s
- Distance: 49 ± 3 Mly (15.0 ± 1.0 Mpc)
- Apparent magnitude (V): 12.75
- Absolute magnitude (V): -18.1 (Note: Calculated from Galactocentric GSR Distance modulus)

Characteristics
- Type: SA(s)cd
- Apparent size (V): 4.6' x 1.3'

Other designations
- UGC 9119, MCG +04-34-008, PGC 50895

NGC 5523 is an unbarred spiral galaxy in the constellation of Boötes, registered in New General Catalogue (NGC). The galaxy forms an equilateral triangle with NGC 5641 and NGC 5466 when observed using a telescope from the ground.

== Observation history ==
NGC 5523 was discovered by William Herschel on 19 May 1784 using 18.7-inch f/13 speculum telescope. John Louis Emil Dreyer inside the New General Catalogue, described it as "faint, pretty large, pretty much extended 90°, 10th magnitude star to northwest". It was described in Burnham's Celestial Handbook as "faint, pretty large (5.0'x0.8'), much elongated, nearly edge-on". Steve Coe, an American astronomer, described it as "faint, pretty large, much elongated (3 X 1) in PA 90 and brighter in the middle at 100X."

== General ==
The galaxy was originally thought to be isolated due to its lack of interaction with other galaxies in the past 1 to 3 billion years. However, a 2016 study reported that some irregularities of the contour of the discs and nucleated bulge at the center of the galaxy suggested that the galaxy previously had soft collisions with other galaxies.
