= C/1958 R1 (Burnham–Slaughter) =

Non-periodic comet

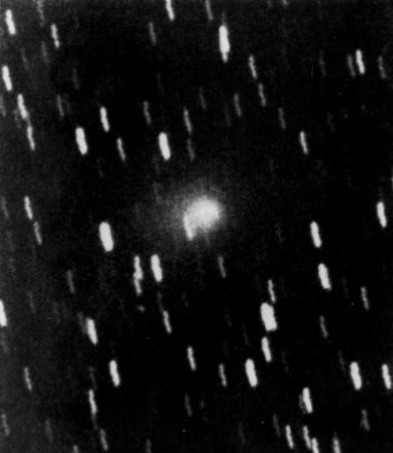
- Comet Burnham–Slaughter photographed by Elizabeth Roemer from the US Naval Observatory on 10 November 1958.

Discovery
- Discovered by: Robert Burnham Jr. Charles D. Slaughter
- Discovery site: Lowell Observatory
- Discovery date: 7 September 1958

Designations
- Alternative designations: 1959 I, 1958e

Orbital characteristics
- Epoch: 21 April 1959 (JD 2436679.5)
- Observation arc: 592 days (1.62 years)
- Number of observations: 94
- Aphelion: ~27,600 AU (inbound); ~7,100 AU (outbound)
- Perihelion: 1.628 AU
- Semi-major axis: ~13,800 AU (inbound); ~3,550 AU (outbound)
- Eccentricity: 0.99984
- Orbital period: ~1.6 million years (inbound); ~210,000 years (outbound)
- Inclination: 61.257°
- Longitude of ascending node: 323.78°
- Argument of periapsis: 100.74°
- Last perihelion: 11 March 1959
- T_{Jupiter}: 0.761
- Earth MOID: 1.158 AU
- Jupiter MOID: 0.578 AU

Physical characteristics
- Comet total magnitude (M1): 13.7
- Apparent magnitude: 11.1 (1959 apparition)

Comet Burnham–Slaughter, also known by its modern designation C/1958 R1, is a faint non-periodic comet that was observed through telescopes between September 1958 and April 1960. It is the first of two comets that were co-discovered by Robert Burnham Jr. and Charles D. Slaughter. (Note: Their second comet, 56P/Slaughter–Burnham, was discovered on 27 January 1959)

== Observational history ==
While conducting a proper motion survey at the Lowell Observatory on 7 September 1958, astronomers Robert Burnham Jr. and Charles D. Slaughter found a new comet using the observatory's 13 in (33 cm) telescope. At the time, it was a diffuse 14th-magnitude object within the constellation Equuleus. (Note: Reported initial position upon discovery was: α = 21^{h} 19.6^{m} , δ = 10° 24′) It was Burnham's third comet discovery overall after C/1957 U1 and C/1958 D1.

Elizabeth Roemer became the only astronomer to regularly observe the comet from late 1959 to early 1960. Upon her final known observation on 21 April 1960, she described the comet as a "weak but fairly sharply condensed" object at magnitude 19.7 within the constellation Hydra. (Note: Positions upon final observation was: α = 9^{h} 16.19^{m} , δ = –15° 18′)

== Orbit ==
George van Biesbroeck calculated the comet's definitive orbit in 1970, using 94 positions recorded in a time span of 592 days. Taking into account the gravitational perturbations of all the planets except Mercury, the comet has a highly parabolic elliptical orbit with an orbital period spanning millions of years, inclined about 61 degrees from the ecliptic. Forward and backward computations of its barycentric orbit in 20-year intervals by Brian G. Marsden has concluded that Burnham–Slaughter is permanently bound to the Solar System.

Additional data from JPL Horizons has indicated that the aphelion of the comet on its outbound trajectory has significantly decreased from 13,800 AU (2.06 trillion km) to 3,550 AU (531 billion km), subsequently reducing its orbital period from 1.6 million years to 210,000 years.
