= NGC 5629 =

Galaxy in the constellation Boötes

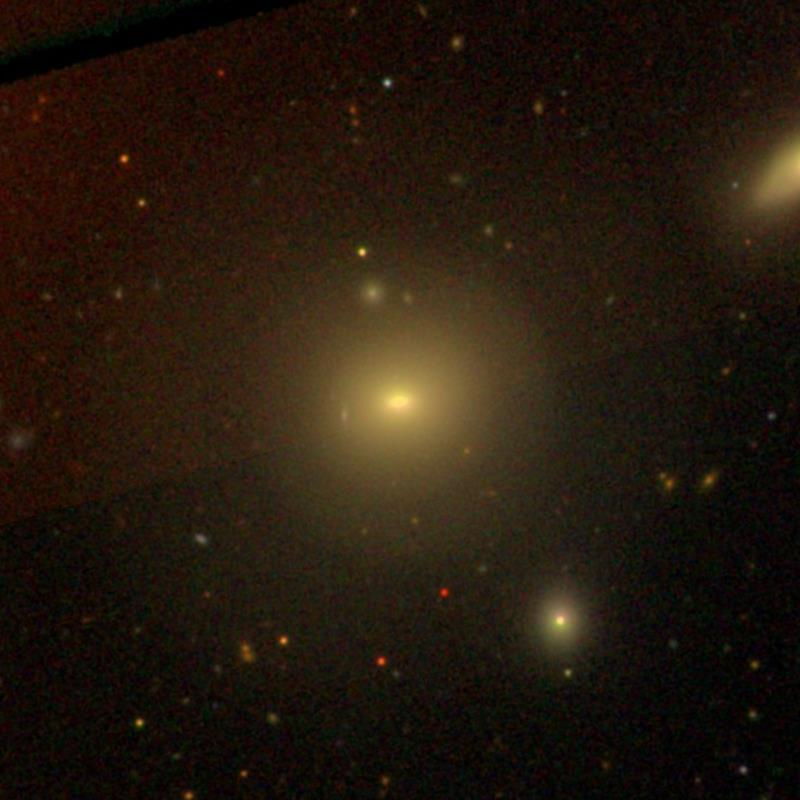

NGC 5629 is a lenticular galaxy located in the constellation Boötes. It was discovered by John Herschel on May 6, 1831. With an apparent magnitude of 12.19, NGC 5629 (NGC 5629) is not visible to the naked eye under dark skies.

== NGC 5653 group ==
According to A. M. Garcia, NGC 5629 is part of the NGC 5653 group (also known as LGG 383). This group of galaxies has at least 15 members, including NGC 5635, NGC 5639, NGC 5641, NGC 5642, NGC 5653, NGC 5659, NGC 5657, NGC 5672, NGC 5703, NGC 5735, IC 4397, UGC 9253, UGC 9268, and UGC 9302.
