= NGC 5641 =

Galaxy in the constellation of Boötes

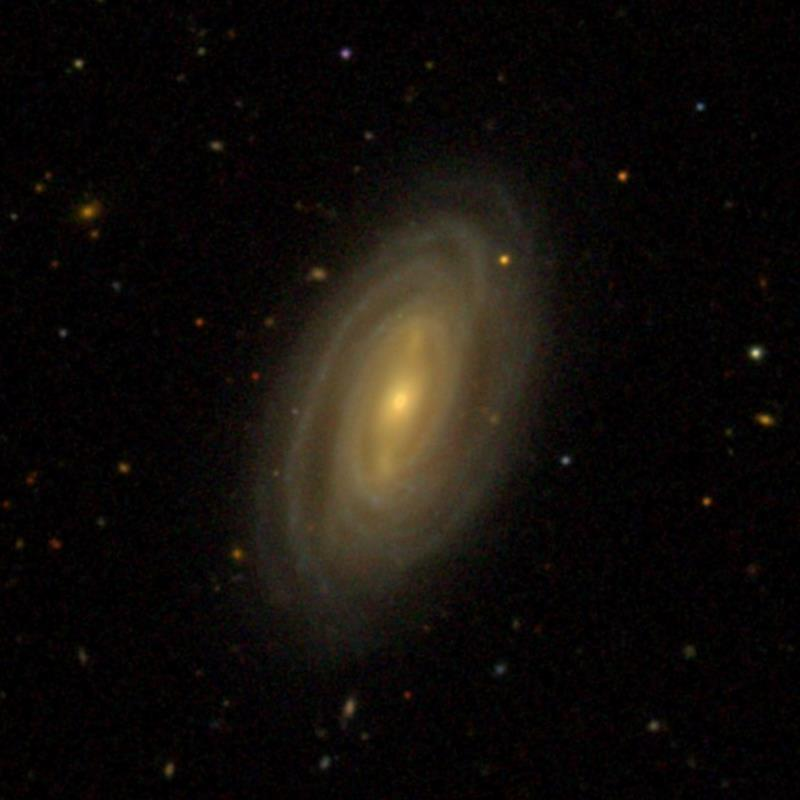
- SDSS image of NGC 5641

Observation data (J2000 epoch)
- Constellation: Boötes
- Right ascension: 14^{h} 29^{m} 16.6^{s}
- Declination: +28° 49′ 18.7″
- Redshift: 0.01440
- Heliocentric radial velocity: 4286 km/s
- Galactocentric velocity: 4384 km/s
- Distance: 196 ± 14 Mly (60.1 ± 4.2 Mpc)
- Apparent magnitude (V): 13.0
- Absolute magnitude (V): -20.9 (Note: Calculated from Galactocentric GSR Distance modulus)

Characteristics
- Type: (R')SAB(r)ab
- Apparent size (V): 2.4' x 1.1'

Other designations
- UGC 9300, MCG +05-34-055, PGC 51758

NGC 5641 is a type Sb-barred spiral galaxy in the constellation of Boötes, registered in New General Catalogue (NGC). It is located five degrees east of NGC 5466.

== Observation history ==
NGC 5641 was discovered by Édouard Stephan on 4 June 1880. John Louis Emil Dreyer inside the New General Catalogue, described the galaxy as "pretty bright, pretty small, a little extended, much brighter middle, mottled but not resolved?" It was described in Burnham's Celestial Handbook as "pretty bright, pretty small, slightly elongated and much brighter in the middle". Walter Scott Houston also noted that this galaxy was missed by William Herschel. He wrote "although NGC 5641 is only 2' long, this should not have been a problem for Herschel observing at 157x."

== NGC 5653 group ==
According to A. M. Garcia, NGC 5641 is part of the NGC 5653 group (also known as LGG 383). This group of galaxies has at least 15 members, including NGC 5629, NGC 5635, NGC 5639, NGC 5642, NGC 5653, NGC 5659, NGC 5657, NGC 5672, NGC 5703, NGC 5735, IC 4397, UGC 9253, UGC 9268, and UGC 9302.
