= NGC 5653 =

Spiral galaxy in the constellation Boötes

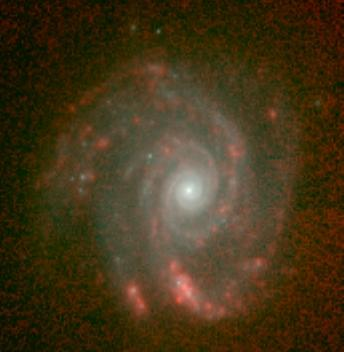
- An Infrared Hubble Space Telescope (HST) image of NGC 5653.

Observation data (J2000 epoch)
- Constellation: Boötes
- Right ascension: 14^{h} 30^{m} 10.4^{s}
- Declination: +31° 12′ 56″
- Redshift: 3562 ± 5 km/s
- Distance: 161 million light-years
- Apparent magnitude (V): 12.9

Characteristics
- Type: (R')SA(rs)b
- Apparent size (V): 1.7′ × 1.3′

Other designations
- UGC 9318, PGC 51814, IRAS 14280+3126, MCG+05-34-058, Z 163-68, 7C 1428+3125, LEDA 51814, IRAS F14280+3126, 2MASX J14301041+3112558, Z 1427.9+3126, IC 1026, ZWG 156.68

NGC 5653 is an unbarred spiral galaxy in the constellation Boötes. It was discovered on March 13, 1785, by William Herschel and subsequently placed in the New General Catalogue.

== NGC 5653 group ==
According to A. M. Garcia, NGC 5653 is the namesake of the NGC 5653 group (also known as LGG 383). This group of galaxies has at least 15 members, including NGC 5629, NGC 5635, NGC 5639, NGC 5641, NGC 5642, NGC 5659, NGC 5657, NGC 5672, NGC 5703, NGC 5735, IC 4397, UGC 9253, UGC 9268, and UGC 9302.
