= NGC 5735 =

Galaxy in the constellation Boötes

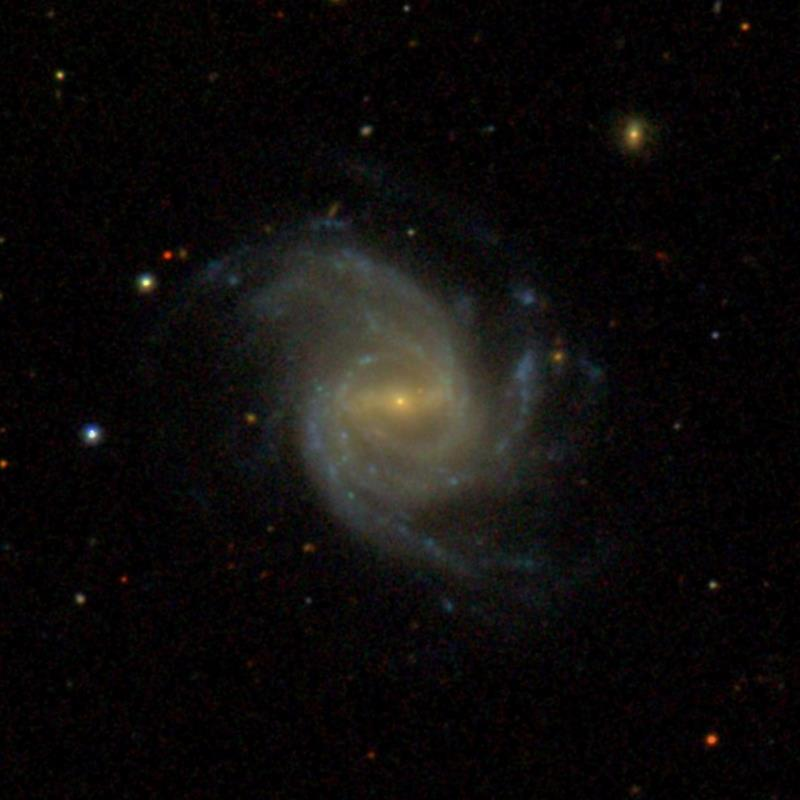
- NGC 5735 imaged by SDSS

Observation data (J2000 epoch)
- Constellation: Boötes
- Right ascension: 14^{h} 42^{m} 33.2479^{s}
- Declination: +28° 43′ 35.420″
- Redshift: 0.012408±0.00000700
- Heliocentric radial velocity: 3,720±2 km/s
- Distance: 190.48 ± 2.45 Mly (58.400 ± 0.751 Mpc)
- Group or cluster: NGC 5653 Group (LGG 383)
- Apparent magnitude (V): 13.10

Characteristics
- Type: SB(rs)bc
- Size: ~155,200 ly (47.57 kpc) (estimated)
- Apparent size (V): 2.4′ × 1.9′

Other designations
- IRAS 14403+2856, 2MASX J14423324+2843347, UGC 9481, MCG +05-35-007, PGC 52535, CGCG 164-013

NGC 5735 is a barred spiral galaxy in the constellation of Boötes. Its velocity with respect to the cosmic microwave background is 3,894±12 km/s, which corresponds to a Hubble distance of 187.3 ± 13.1 Mly (57.44 ± 4.02 Mpc). Additionally, three non-redshift measurements give a similar mean distance of 190.48 ± 2.45 Mly (58.400 ± 0.751 Mpc). It was discovered by German-British astronomer William Herschel on 17 May 1784.

NGC 5735 is a LINER galaxy, i.e. a galaxy whose nucleus has an emission spectrum characterized by broad lines of weakly ionized atoms.

== NGC 5653 group ==
NGC 5735 is a member of the NGC 5653 group (also known as LGG 383). This group contains 15 galaxies, including NGC 5629, NGC 5635, NGC 5639, NGC 5641, NGC 5642, NGC 5653, NGC 5659, NGC 5657, NGC 5672, NGC 5703, IC 4397, UGC 9253, UGC 9268, and UGC 9302.

== Supernova ==
One supernova has been observed in NGC 5735:

- SN 2006qp (Type IIb, mag. 17.1) was discovered by Kōichi Itagaki on 25 November 2006.

== See also ==
- List of NGC objects (5001–6000)
