= Daniel du Toit =

South African astronomer

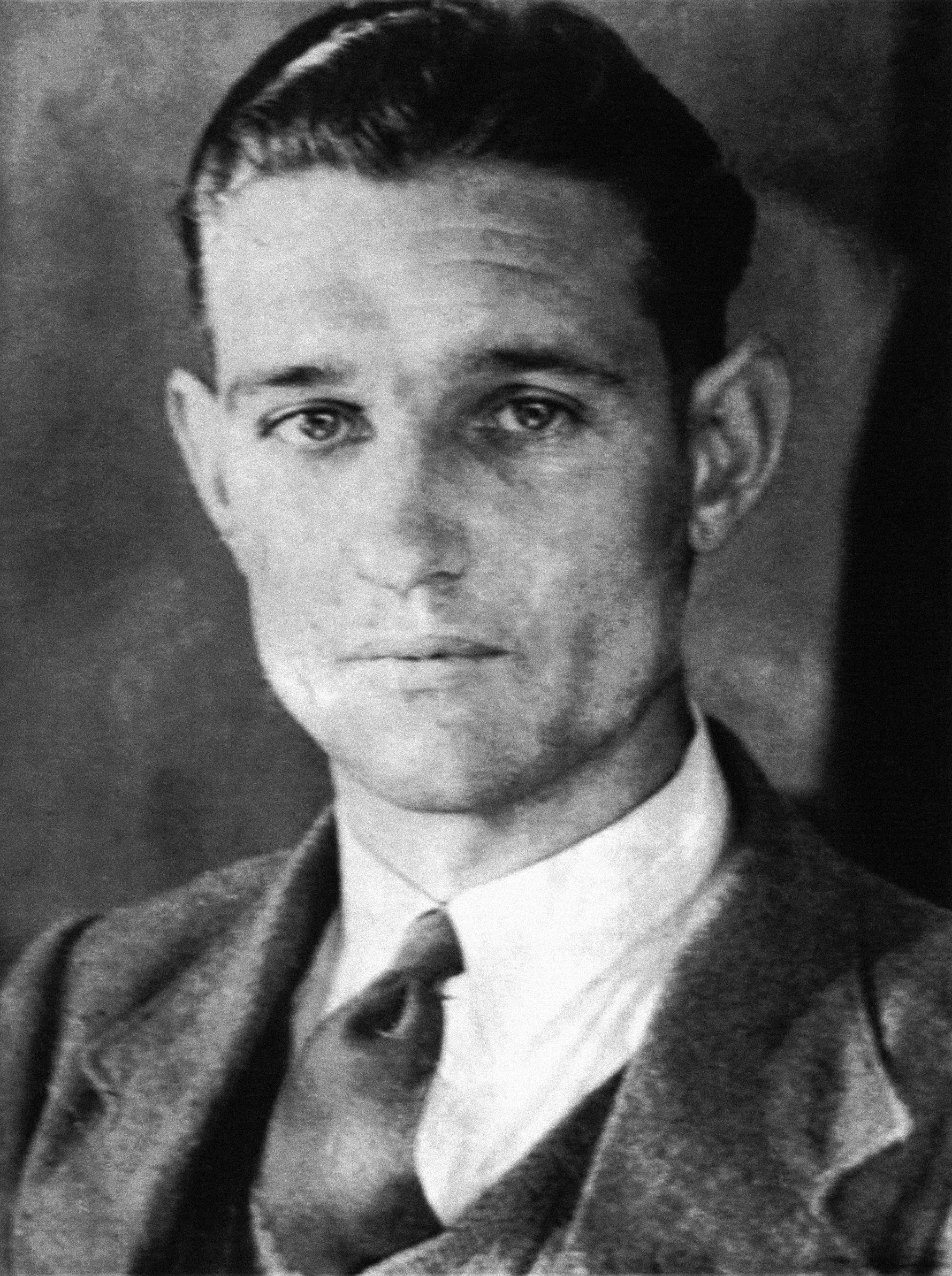
- Born: 15 December 1917; Springfontein, Free State
- Died: 28 September 1981 (aged 63); Bloemfontein, Free State
- Scientific career
- Institutions: Boyden Observatory

Daniel Stefanus du Toit (1917–1981) was a South African astronomer.

Daniel Stefanus du Toit was born in Springfontein, in the Free State, South Africa, on 15 December 1917, he was educated at the Sentraal High school Hoërskool Sentraal in Bloemfontein, after school he entered employment at the Boyden Observatory (Harvard College Observatory, Boyden station) at Maselspoort in 1936, and became the chief assistant to the director dr John S. Paraskevopoulos.

He discovered and co-discovered several comets, including 57P/du Toit–Neujmin–Delporte, 66P/du Toit, 79P/du Toit–Hartley. He worked at Boyden Observatory Maselspoort, Free State, South Africa (then administered by Harvard College Observatory, Boyden Station).

All comets were discovered whilst examining photographic plates taken by the Bache or Metcalf telescopes. It was their job to check the photographic plates taken on behalf of Harlow Shapley, then Director at Harvard. The exposures were generally 45 minutes on Cramer High Speed Blue plates, or later Kodak 103a, taken with the 10-inch Metcalf or 8-inch Bache telescopes.

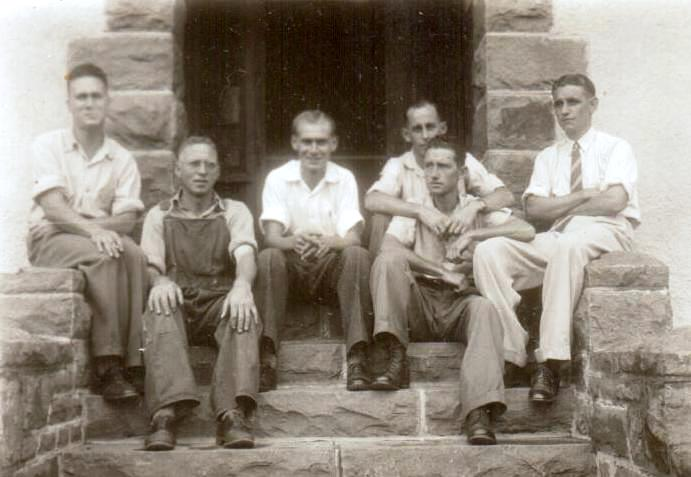
Michael Bester far left and Daniel du Toit on the far right in 1941 (courtesy Boyden Observatory)

It was during the examination of the exposure for image quality that Daniel du Toit discovered his comets. Daniel du toit and his colleague Michiel Bester discovered several comets, with Michiel Bester ranked first with 6 comets discovered, and Daniel discovering 5 comets and dr J.S. Paraskevopoulos discovering 2 this gives the Boyden Observatory a total of 13 comets discovered.

Daniel du Toit, discovered his five comets between 1941 and 1945. Three of Du Toit's five comets can still be observed today. His first comet is 57P/du Toit–Neujmin–Delporte (retrospectively designated as P/1941 O1), his second is 66P du Toit, and his third is 79P/du Toit–Hartley. The latter has been in the news recently due to the breakup of its nucleus. In 2002 it was discovered that 57P/du Toit–Neujmin–Delporte to have broken up into at least 19 fragments.

79P/du Toit–Hartley or du Toit 2 is a periodic comet, now divided into two parts, in the Solar System with an orbital period of 5.06 years. Discovered: 9 April 1945 a Jupiter family comet, expected back 2018 September 13, The dust trail complex of comet 79P/du Toit-Hartley and meteor outbursts at Mars. Uncertainties in the calculation of the orbit meant the comet was lost until rediscovered by Malcolm Hartley of the UK Schmidt Telescope Unit, Siding Spring, Australia in 1982, when it was found to have broken into two parts, probably in 1976. Both parts had a brightness of magnitude 17. Observed in 1987, it was missed in 1992 but rediscovered by astronomers at Los Molinos Observatory, Uruguay on 4 March 2003 at magnitude 17. Discoverers: Daniel du Toit, Malcolm Hartley Discovered: on 9 April 1945 with a brightness of apparent magnitude 10.

Du Toit comets discovered: 5
| P/1941 O1 or 57P/du Toit–Neujmin–Delporte | 18 July 1941 |
| P/1944 K1 or 66P/du Toit | 16 May 1944 |
| P/1945 G1 or 79P/du Toit–Hartley | 9 April 1945 |
| C/1945 L1 (du Toit) | 11 June 1945 |
| C/1945 X1 (du Toit) | 11 December 1945 |

Boyden Observatory Comets discovered: 13
| P/1940 O1 Paraskevopoulos | 8 October 1940 |
| P/1941 B2 Paraskevopoulos | 23 January 1941 |
| P/1941 O1 du Toit | 18 July 1941 |
| P/1944 K1 du Toit | 16 May 1944 |
| P/1945 G1 du Toit | 9 April 1945 |
| C/1945 L1 du Toit | 11 June 1945 |
| C/1945 X1 du Toit | 11 December 1945 |
| C/1946 U1 Bester | 31 October 1946 |
| C/1947 F1 Bester | 24 March 1947 |
| C/1947 F1 Bester | 18 May 1947 |
| C/1947 S1 Bester | 25 September 1947 |
| C/1948 W1 Bester | 24 November 1948 |
| C/1959 O1 Bester | 26 July 1959 |

The 1937 team consisted of Dr Paraskevopoulos, Bester, Du Toit, de Villiers and Steyn.

Daniel du Toit left the observatory post war 1946, to pursue a career in the building industry but was forced into early career change by an accident, losing his leg in later years. He died on 28 September 1981 at the age of 63 in Bloemfontein, South Africa.

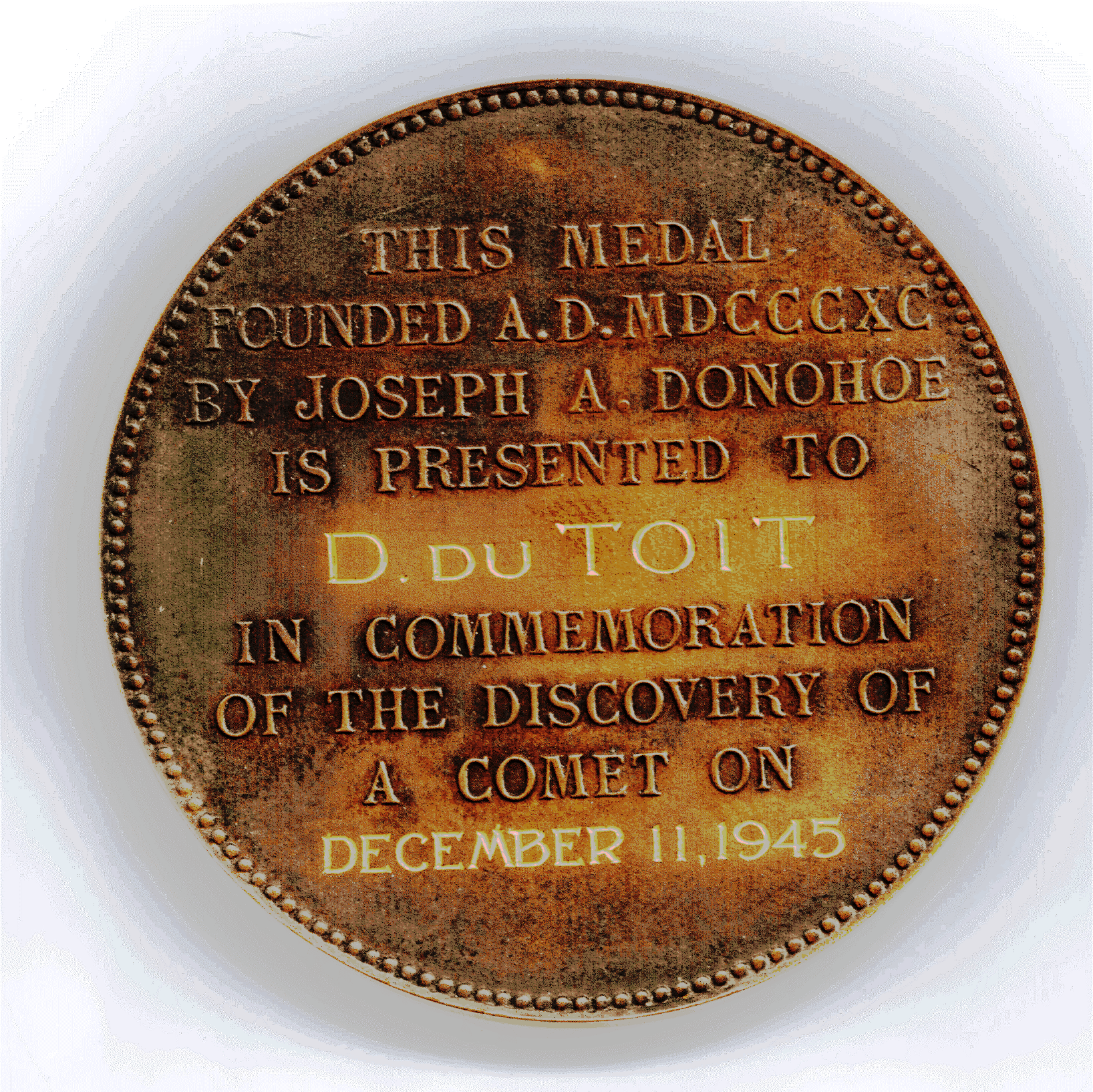
One of the medals from the Astronomical Society of the Pacific to Daniel du Toit for the discovery of each of the comets

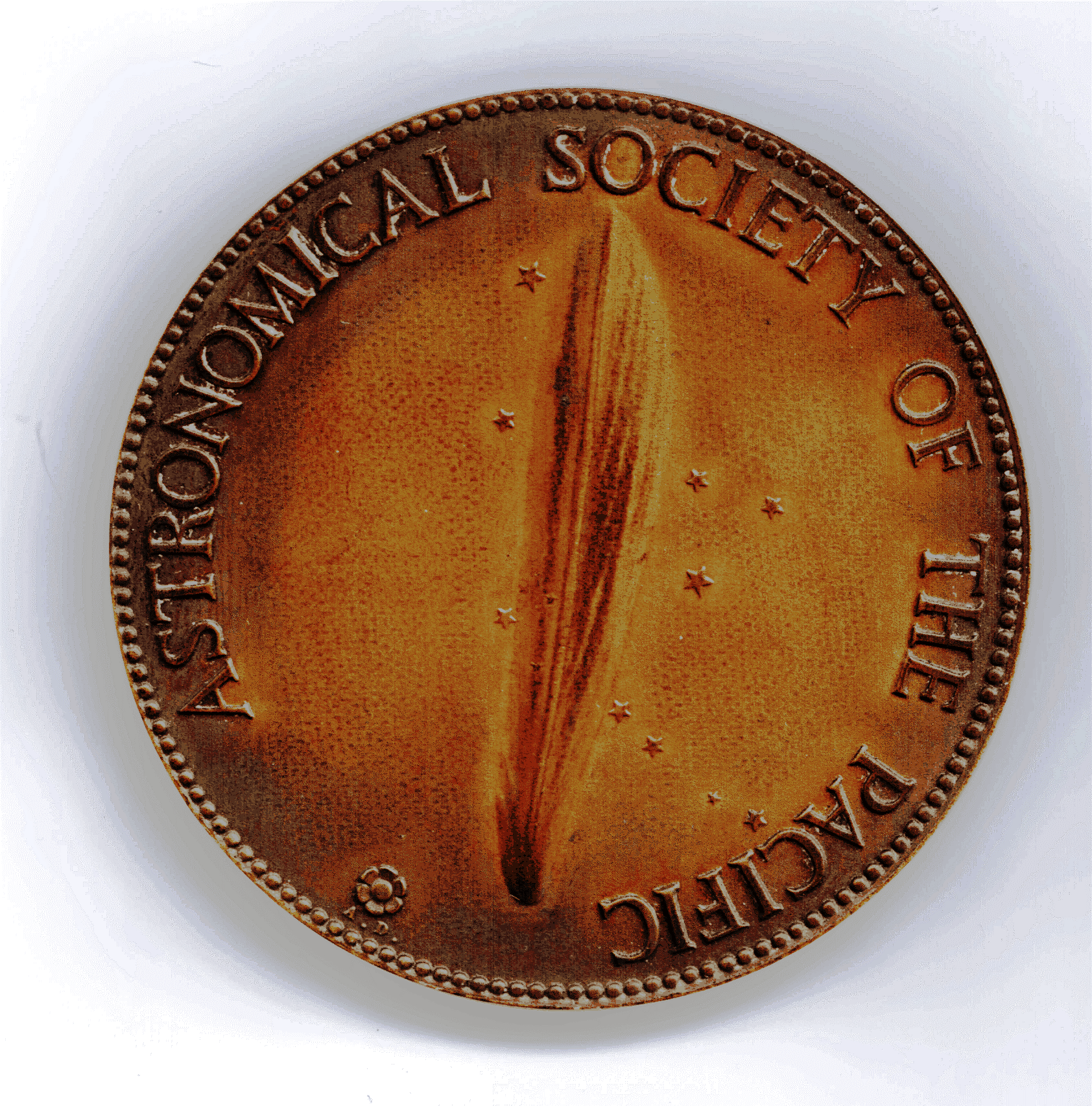
Back of medal
