= IC 4397 =

Galaxy in the constellation Boötes

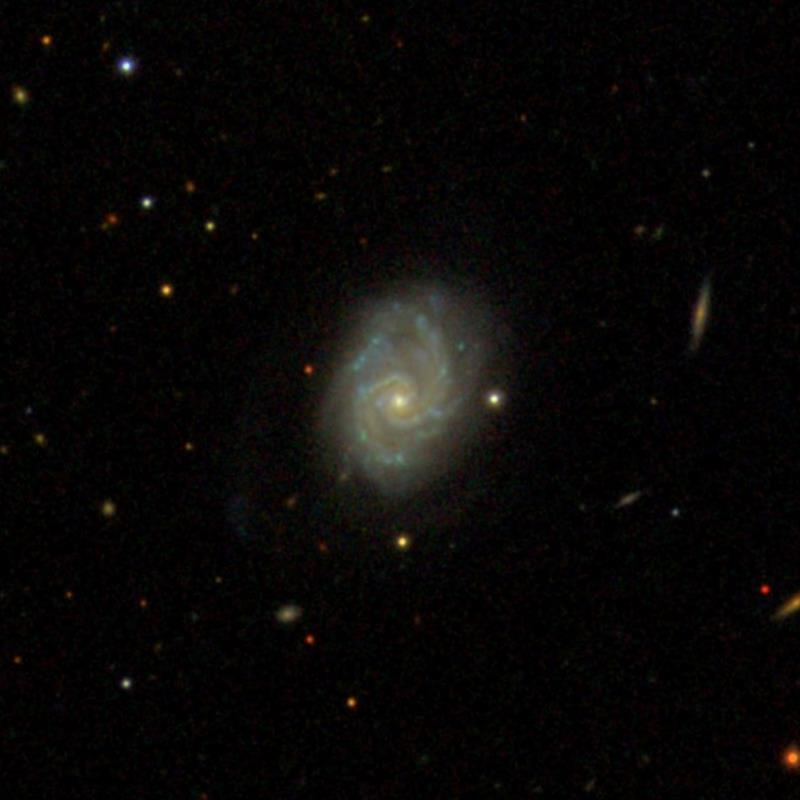
- IC 4397 imaged by SDSS

Observation data (J2000 epoch)
- Constellation: Boötes
- Right ascension: 14^{h} 17^{m} 58.7102^{s}
- Declination: +26° 24′ 45.889″
- Redshift: 0.014744±0.0000200
- Heliocentric radial velocity: 4,420±6 km/s
- Distance: 222.6 ± 15.6 Mly (68.25 ± 4.78 Mpc)
- Group or cluster: NGC 5653 group (LGG 383)
- Apparent magnitude (V): 14.14

Characteristics
- Type: S
- Size: ~103,500 ly (31.72 kpc) (estimated)
- Apparent size (V): 1.1′ × 0.9′

Other designations
- IRAS 14156+2638, 2MASS J14175870+2624454, UGC 9150, MCG +05-34-012, Mrk 1510, PGC 51073, CGCG 163-018

IC 4397 is a spiral galaxy in the constellation of Boötes. Its velocity with respect to the cosmic microwave background is 4,627±16 km/s, which corresponds to a Hubble distance of 222.6 ± 15.6 Mly (68.25 ± 4.78 Mpc). It was discovered by French astronomer Guillaume Bigourdan on 23 June 1889.

IC 4397 has an active galactic nucleus, i.e. it has a compact region at the center of a galaxy that emits a significant amount of energy across the electromagnetic spectrum, with characteristics indicating that this luminosity is not produced by the stars. It is a Seyfert II galaxy, i.e. it has a quasar-like nucleus with very high surface brightness, whose spectra reveal strong, high-ionisation emission lines, but unlike quasars, the host galaxy is clearly detectable. The nucleus also shines brightly in the ultraviolet. IC 4397 is listed in the Markarian catalogue as Mrk 1510.

== NGC 5653 group ==
According to A. M. Garcia, IC 4397 is part of the NGC 5653 group (also known as LGG 383). This group of galaxies has at least 15 members, including NGC 5629, NGC 5635, NGC 5639, NGC 5641, NGC 5642, NGC 5653, NGC 5659, NGC 5657, NGC 5672, NGC 5703, NGC 5735, UGC 9253, UGC 9268, and UGC 9302.

== Supernovae ==
Three supernovae have been observed in IC 4397:

- SN 2018dbg (Type Ib/Ic, mag. 18.43) was discovered by the Zwicky Transient Facility on 28 June 2018.
- SN 2019hyk (Type II, mag. 16.5) was discovered by ASAS-SN on 22 June 2019.
- SN 2025afdy (Type Ia, mag. 16.003) was discovered by ATLAS on 27 November 2025.

== See also ==
- List of IC objects
