= 65P/Gunn =

Periodic comet

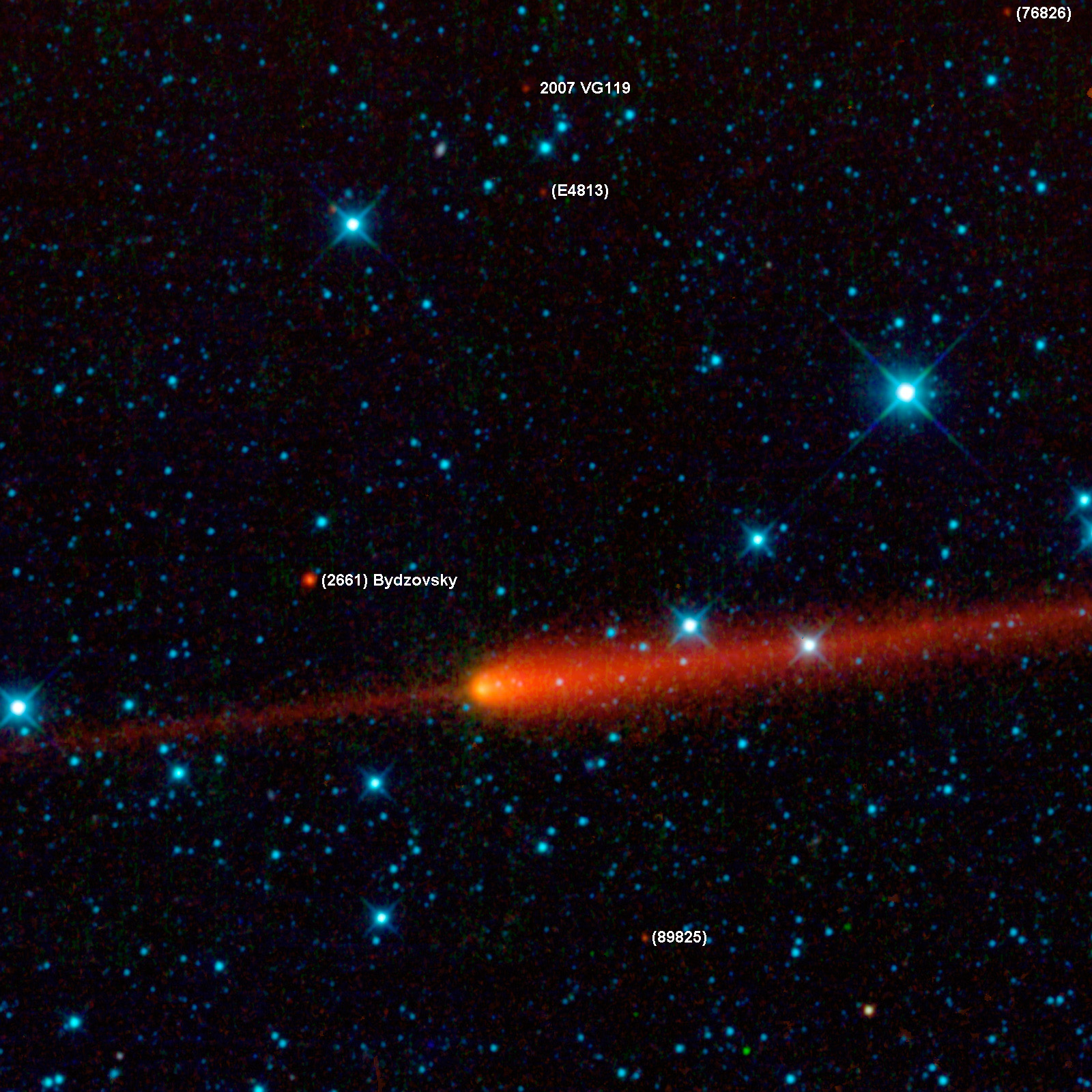
- Infrared image of Gunn's Comet taken from the WISE observatory on 11 June 2010.

Discovery
- Discovered by: James E. Gunn
- Discovery site: Palomar Observatory
- Discovery date: 17 October 1970

Designations
- MPC designation: P/1954 P1, P/1970 U2
- Alternative designations: 1953 VIII, 1969 II; 1976 III, 1989 XI; 1970p

Orbital characteristics
- Epoch: 9 June 2026 (JD 2461200.5)
- Observation arc: 72.02 years (Note: Observation arc from the Minor Planet Center database covering dates from 8 August 1954 until 14 August 2026.)
- Earliest precovery date: 8 August 1954
- Number of observations: 7,463
- Aphelion: 4.852 AU
- Perihelion: 2.926 AU
- Semi-major axis: 3.891 AU
- Eccentricity: 0.24807
- Orbital period: 6.414 years
- Inclination: 9.175°
- Longitude of ascending node: 61.965°
- Argument of periapsis: 213.62°
- Mean anomaly: 45.948°
- Last perihelion: 16 June 2025
- Next perihelion: 11 February 2033
- T_{Jupiter}: 2.991
- Earth MOID: 1.903 AU
- Jupiter MOID: 0.396 AU

Physical characteristics
- Mean radius: < 5.4 km (3.4 mi)
- Spectral type: (V–R) = 0.54±0.06
- Comet total magnitude (M1): 10.1

65P/Gunn is a Jupiter-family comet orbiting the Sun every 7.67 years inside the main asteroid belt between the orbits of the planets Mars and Jupiter.

== Observational history ==
It was discovered on 11 October 1970 by James E. Gunn of Princeton University using the 122-cm Schmidt telescope at the Palomar Observatory. It had a low brightness of magnitude 16 at that time. In 1972, Elizabeth Roemer managed to observe 65P/Gunn close to aphelion.

In 1980, it was noticed that a 19th magnitude comet found in plates obtained by Palomar Observatory on 8 August 1954 was a previous apparition of 65P/Gunn. The link was confirmed by Toshiro Nomura and Brian G. Marsden.

During the very favorable apparition of 1996, 65P/Gunn reached magnitude 12.

== Orbit ==
As of June 2026, 65P/Gunn currently has an orbit inclined about 9.2 degrees from the ecliptic, which takes it between 2.93 AU (438 million km) and 4.852 AU (725.8 million km) from the Sun. Between 1910 and 2135, the comet made several close approaches to Jupiter, including four that were closer than 1.0 AU (150 million km) from the giant planet. (Note: The comet made its closest encounters with Jupiter in 1965 (0.36 AU), 2012 (0.56 AU), 2072 (0.91 AU) and 2096 (0.73 AU), respectively.)

On 4 February 1970, the comet passed 0.015 AU (2.2 million km; 1.4 million mi) from Ceres.

== Physical characteristics ==
Infrared observations from the IRAS satellite in 1983 detected a dust trail around 65P/Gunn, indicating that it had a mass loss rate of 27±9 kg/s. Additional observations from the Infrared Space Observatory in 1996 revealed a strongly asymmetric dust trail, with a higher mass loss rate of 100–300 kg/s by November 1996.

CCD photometry conducted between 1993 and 1996 reveal a nucleus that is less than 11 km (6.8 mi) in diameter, later revised to 10.8 km (6.7 mi). The comet was very active when it was observed, therefore the size estimate likely represent an upper limit.

== Notes ==
Numbered comets
Previous; 64P/Swift–Gehrels	65P/Gunn	Next; 66P/du Toit
