= 79P/du Toit–Hartley =

Periodic comet with 5 year orbit

Discovery
- Discovered by: Daniel du Toit; Malcolm Hartley
- Discovery site: Boyden Observatory, South Africa; Siding Spring Observatory, Australia
- Discovery date: 9 April 1945; 7 February 1982

Designations
- MPC designation: P/1945 G1; P/1982 C1
- Alternative designations: 1945 II, 1945c; 1982 II, 1982b; 1987 IX, 1986q

Orbital characteristics
- Epoch: 17 October 2024 (JD 2460600.5)
- Observation arc: 79.32 years
- Number of observations: 323
- Aphelion: 4.766 AU
- Perihelion: 1.121 AU
- Semi-major axis: 2.943 AU
- Eccentricity: 0.61920
- Orbital period: 5.049 years
- Inclination: 3.149°
- Longitude of ascending node: 280.52°
- Argument of periapsis: 281.76°
- Mean anomaly: 74.702°
- Last perihelion: 30 September 2023
- Next perihelion: 16 October 2028
- T_{Jupiter}: 2.943
- Earth MOID: 0.234 AU
- Jupiter MOID: 0.366 AU

Physical characteristics
- Mean diameter: 2.8 km (1.7 mi)
- Comet total magnitude (M1): 17.4

79P/du Toit–Hartley or du Toit 2 is a periodic comet, now divided into two parts, in the Solar System with an orbital period of 5.06 years. Its most recent perihelion was reached on 30 September 2023. It was about 2.7 AU (400 million km) from the Sun and Earth on 26 May 2024.

== Observational history ==
It was originally discovered by Daniel du Toit at the Boyden Observatory, Bloemfontein, South Africa (then administered by Harvard College) on 9 April 1945 with a brightness of apparent magnitude 10.

Uncertainties in the calculation of the orbit meant the comet was lost until rediscovered by Malcolm Hartley of the UK Schmidt Telescope Unit, Siding Spring, Australia in 1982, when it was found to have broken into two parts, probably in 1976. Both parts had a brightness of magnitude 17. Observed in 1987, it was missed in 1992 but rediscovered by astronomers at Los Molinos Observatory, Uruguay on 4 March 2003 at magnitude 17. Fragment 79P-B is lost as it only has a 23-day observation arc from 1982.

== See also ==
- List of numbered comets

Numbered comets
Previous; 78P/Gehrels	79P/du Toit–Hartley	Next; 80P/Peters–Hartley
