= Carnot (crater) =

Crater on the Moon

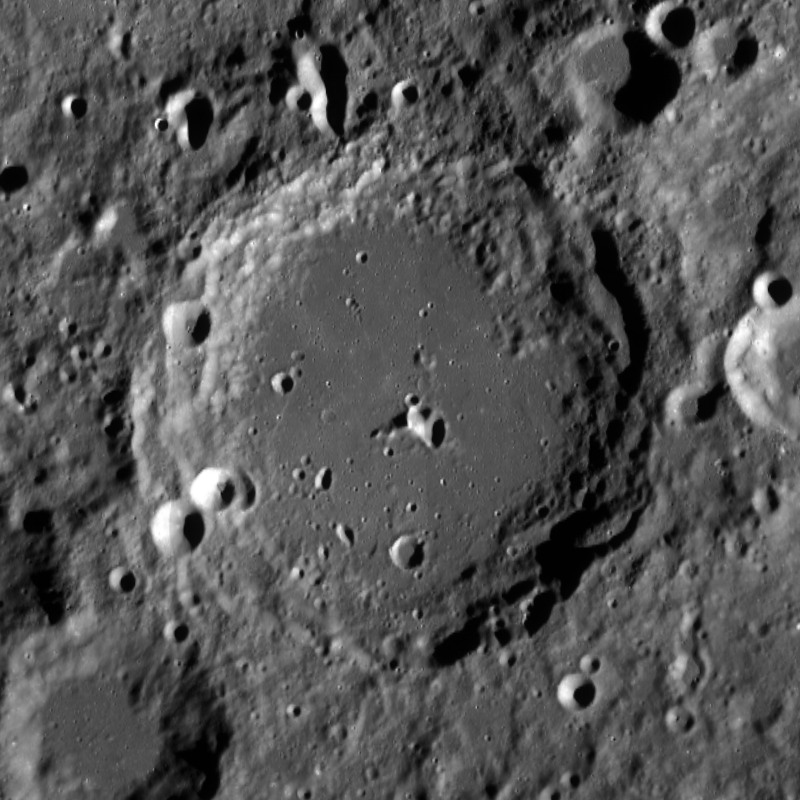
- LRO image
- Coordinates: 52.09°N 144.20°W
- Diameter: 126.06 km (78.33 mi)
- Depth: Unknown
- Colongitude: 146° at sunrise
- Formation: Nectarian
- Eponym: Nicolas L. S. Carnot

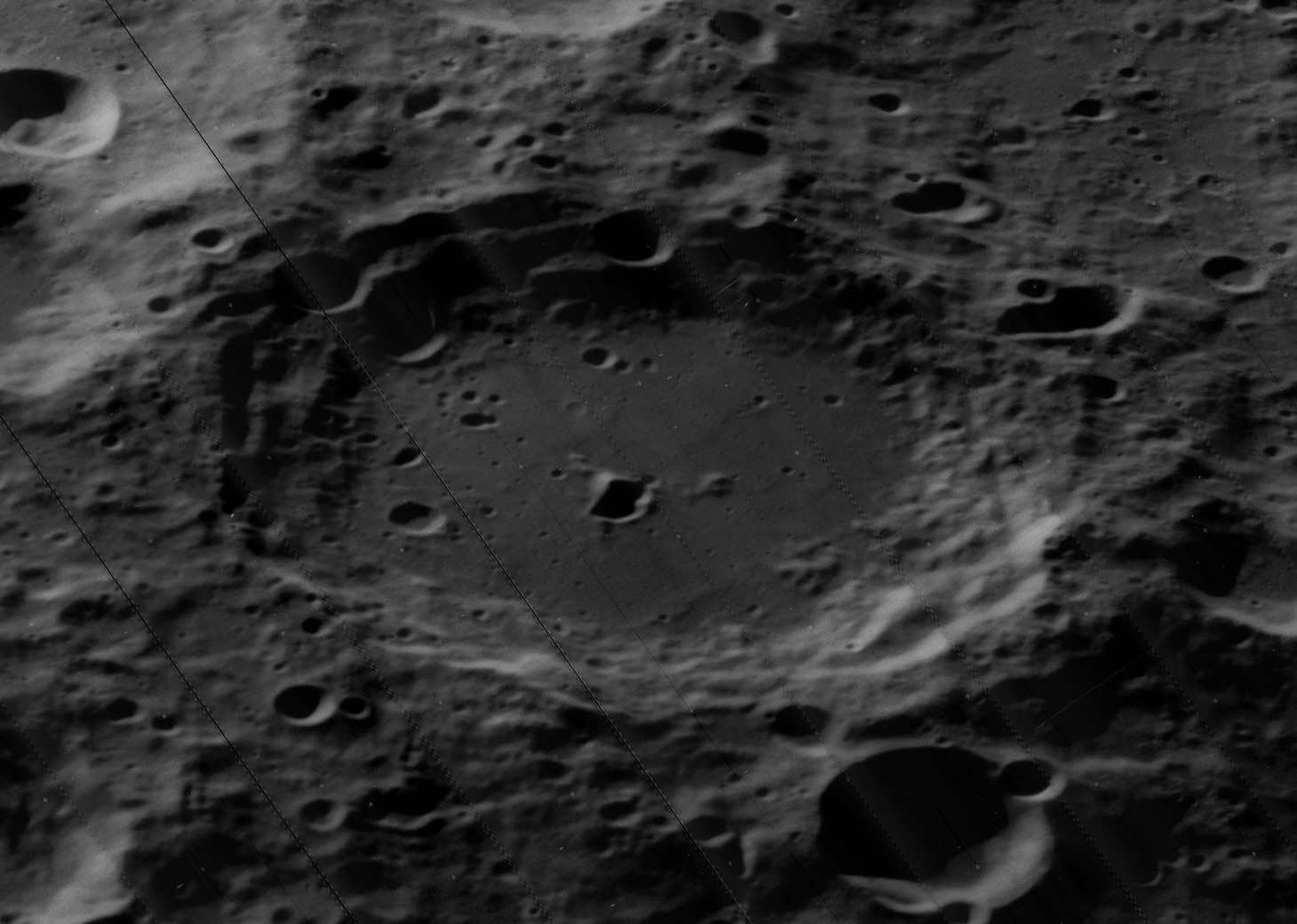
Oblique Lunar Orbiter 5 image

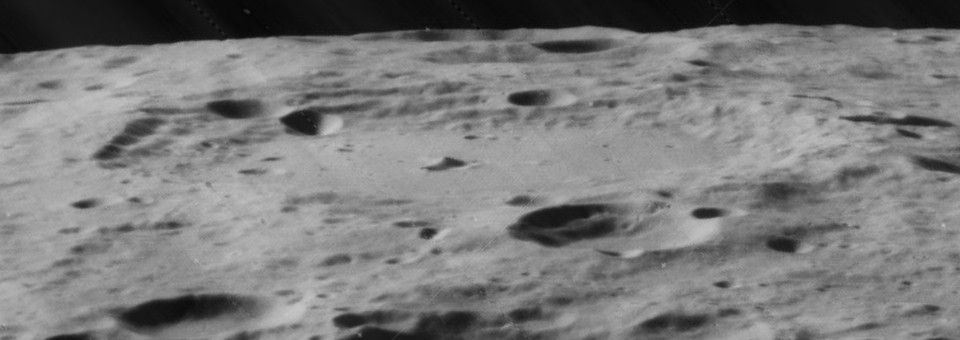
Highly oblique view also from Lunar Orbiter 5

Carnot (English: /kɑːrˈnoʊ/ kar-NOH, French: [kaʁno]) is a large crater in the northern part of the Moon's far side. Carnot intrudes into the southern rim of Birkhoff, a huge walled plain. To the west-southwest of Carnot is the crater Paraskevopoulos. This crater was named after French physicist Nicolas L. S. Carnot (1796–1832). Its designation was formally adopted by the IAU in 1970.

This impact crater was created during the Nectarian period of the lunar geologic timescale. The outer rim of Carnot has a somewhat hexagonal form, particularly in the southern half. The northern rim has an irregular inner wall, while the southern face is terraced and has a sharper outer edge. There is some slumping along the rim edge to the southeast, producing outward bulges in the perimeter. The western inner wall is partly overlaid by three small, cup-shaped craters.

Within the rim, the crater floor is flat and level, at least in comparison to the rugged terrain around the exterior. Mare material may be present, particularly in the northeast. Just to the southeast of the crater midpoint is a central peak formation. The infrared spectrum of pure crystalline plagioclase has been identified on this peak. The interior floor is marked by several small and numerous tiny craters. The most prominent of the craters on the floor is a small, shallow crater near the southern inner wall.

== Satellite craters ==
By convention these features are identified on lunar maps by placing the letter on the side of the crater midpoint that is closest to Carnot.

Carnot	Latitude	Longitude	Diameter
F	52.5° N	138.9° W	35 km
