= 66P/du Toit =

Periodic comet with 15 year orbit

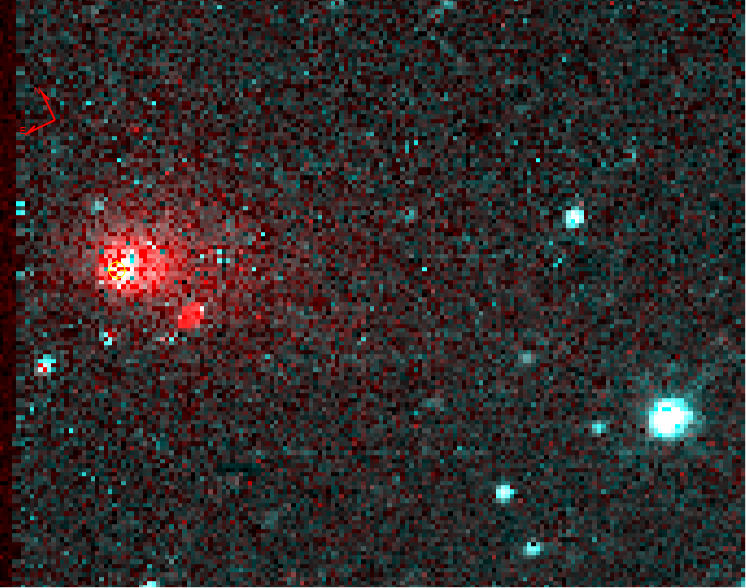

Discovery
- Discovered by: Daniel du Toit at Boyden Observatory, South Africa
- Discovery date: 16 May 1944

Orbital characteristics
- Aphelion: 10.7302 AU
- Perihelion: 1.2742 AU
- Semi-major axis: 6.0235 AU
- Eccentricity: 0.788
- Orbital period: 14.78 yr
- Inclination: 18.70°
- Last perihelion: 2018 May 19
- Next perihelion: 2033-Apr-18

66P/du Toit is a periodic comet in the Solar System with a current orbital period of 14.78 years. It came to perihelion on 2018 May 19 at roughly apparent magnitude 12.

It was discovered by Daniel du Toit at the Boyden Observatory, South Africa on 16 May 1944, who estimated its brightness at magnitude 10. Other observers estimated magnitude 11 and 12.5. Its next return date was calculated to have a perihelion date of 10 April 1959 but it was not discovered.

The 1974 return was found almost accidentally with a perihelion date of 1 April 1974 and a brightness of magnitude 18–19. The 1989 appearance was again missed. The 2003 appearance had a perihelion date of 27 August 2003 and a brightness of magnitude 20.

== See also ==
- List of numbered comets

Numbered comets
Previous; 65P/Gunn	66P/du Toit	Next; 67P/Churyumov–Gerasimenko
