= 78P/Gehrels =

Jupiter-family comet

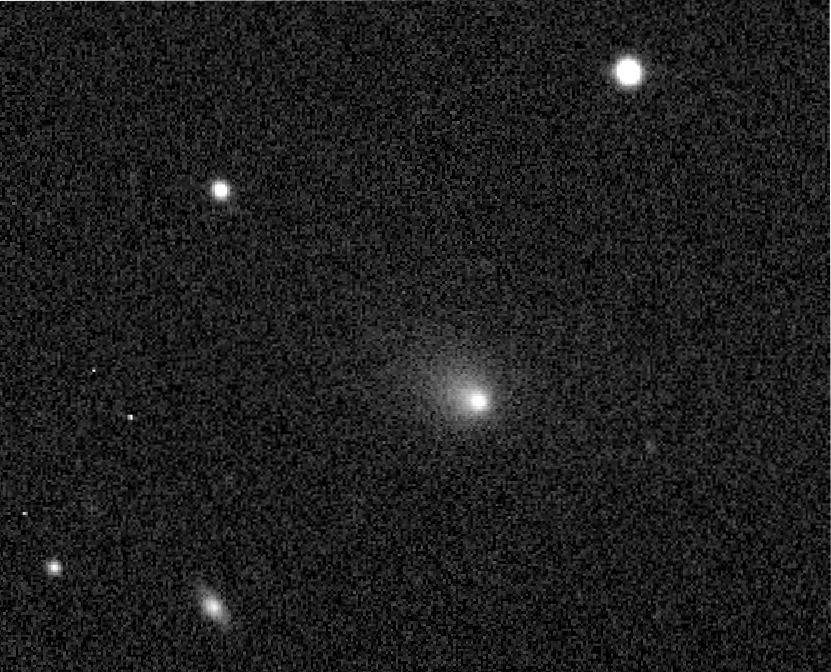
- Comet Gehrels 2 photographed from the Zwicky Transient Facility on 27 January 2019

Discovery
- Discovered by: Tom Gehrels
- Discovery site: Palomar Observatory, Arizona, USA
- Discovery date: 29 September 1973

Designations
- MPC designation: P/1973 S1, P/1981 L1
- Alternative designations: Gehrels 2; 1973 XI, 1981 XVII; 1989 XVII; 1973n, 1981f, 1989n

Orbital characteristics
- Epoch: 9 June 2026 (JD 2461200.5)
- Observation arc: 52.247 years
- Number of observations: 8,640
- Aphelion: 5.459 AU; 7.091 AU (2038)
- Perihelion: 2.004 AU; 4.121 AU (2032)
- Semi-major axis: 3.732 AU
- Eccentricity: 0.4629
- Orbital period: 7.209 years
- Inclination: 6.2577°
- Longitude of ascending node: 210.49°
- Argument of periapsis: 192.80°
- Mean anomaly: 357.80°
- Last perihelion: 25 June 2026; 2 April 2019
- Next perihelion: 9 January 2032
- T_{Jupiter}: 2.887
- Earth MOID: 1.022 AU
- Jupiter MOID: 0.024 AU

Physical characteristics
- Mean radius: 4.21 km (2.62 mi)
- Mean density: 550±80 kg/m^{3}
- Spectral type: (B–V) = 0.88±0.02; (V–R) = 0.27±0.02
- Comet total magnitude (M1): 9.1
- Comet nuclear magnitude (M2): 12.5

78P/Gehrels, also known as Gehrels 2, is a Jupiter-family comet roughly 8 km in diameter with a current orbital period of 7.2 years. It is the second periodic comet discovered by American astronomer, Tom Gehrels.

At perihelion on 25 June 2026 the solar elongation was 33 degrees at an apparent magnitude of approximately 15, The closest approach to Earth will be on 31 December 2026 at a distance of 1.56 AU (233 million km). The comet will make a very close approach to Jupiter in September 2029 that will move the orbit outwards and the comet will next come to perihelion on 9 January 2032 at a distance of 4.1 AU from the Sun.

== Observational history ==
It was discovered by Tom Gehrels on photographic plates exposed between 29 September and 5 October 1973 at the Palomar Observatory. It had a brightness of apparent magnitude of 15. Brian G. Marsden computed the parabolic and elliptical orbits which suggested an orbital period of 8.76 years, later revising the data to give a perihelion date of 30 November 1963 and orbital period of 7.93 years.

The comet's predicted next appearance was observed by W. and A. Cochran at the McDonald Observatory, Texas on 8 June 1981. It was observed again in 1989 and in 1997, when favourable conditions meant that brightness increased to magnitude 12. It has subsequently been observed on every apparition since, with the first polarimetric observations of the comet were conducted at the Girawali Observatory in 2012.

== Physical characteristics ==
Initial CCD observations of 78P/Gehrels in 2003 indicated that it has a small nucleus of only around 1.54 km (0.96 mi). Photometry obtained from the Isaac Newton Telescope in 2006 revealed it has an effective radius of about 4.21 km (2.62 mi) instead, however this might represent its upper limit. The maximum dust production rate during its 2019 apparition was measured at Afρ = 1028.1±13.3 cm, making it one of the most active Jupiter-family comets ever known.

== Orbit ==
The dynamical history of this comet indicated that it had resided within the planetary region of the Solar System for about a million years, but its migration to the inner Solar System is only relatively recent, with its first encounter with Jupiter occurred only about 500 years ago. Comet 78P/Gehrels' aphelion at a distance of 5.4 AU (810 million km) from the Sun meant that its orbit is frequently perturbed by Jupiter. On 15 September 2029, the comet will pass within 0.018 AU (2.7 million km) of Jupiter—slightly outside the orbit of Callisto—and be strongly perturbed. By the year 2200, the comet will have a centaur-like orbit with a perihelion (closest distance to the Sun) near Jupiter. This outward migration from a perihelion of 2.01 AU (301 million km) to 5.057 AU (756.5 million km) could cause the comet to go dormant.

The Outward Migration of 78P/Gehrels
Year (epoch)	2009	2030	2200
Semi-major axis	3.73	6.02	9.37
Perihelion	2.00	4.08	4.99
Aphelion	5.46	7.96	13.7

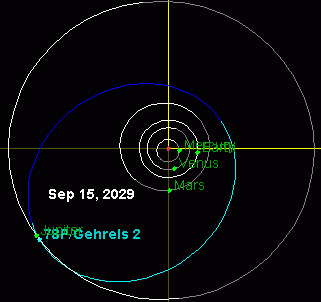
Comet 78P passing within 0.018 AU (2.7 million km) of Jupiter in 2029.

Numbered comets
Previous; 77P/Longmore	78P/Gehrels	Next; 79P/du Toit–Hartley
