= 77P/Longmore =

Jupiter-family comet

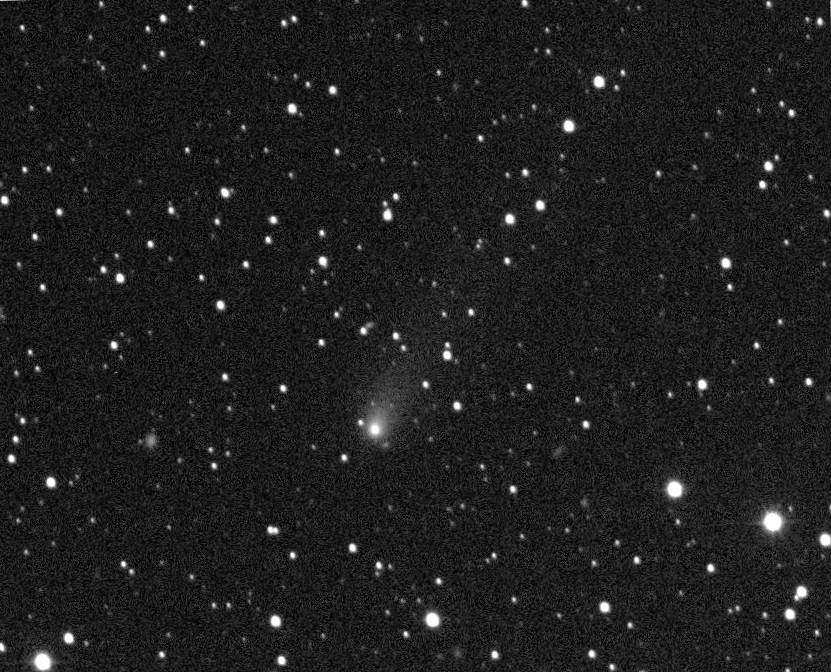
- Longmore's Comet imaged from the Zwicky Transient Facility on 27 April 2023

Discovery
- Discovered by: Andrew J. Longmore
- Discovery site: Siding Spring Observatory
- Discovery date: 10 June 1975

Designations
- MPC designation: P/1975 L1, P/1981 A1
- Alternative designations: 1974 XIV, 1981 XVI; 1988 XVIII; 1975g, 1981a, 1987c1; 1994q

Orbital characteristics
- Epoch: 17 October 2024 (JD 2460600.5)
- Observation arc: 49.37 years
- Number of observations: 2,712
- Aphelion: 4.895 AU
- Perihelion: 2.348 AU
- Semi-major axis: 3.621 AU
- Eccentricity: 0.35166
- Orbital period: 6.891 years
- Inclination: 24.320°
- Longitude of ascending node: 14.457°
- Argument of periapsis: 196.65°
- Mean anomaly: 80.540°
- Last perihelion: 3 April 2023
- Next perihelion: 18 February 2030
- T_{Jupiter}: 2.860
- Earth MOID: 1.338 AU
- Jupiter MOID: 0.202 AU

Physical characteristics
- Mean radius: 1.66 ± 0.12 km (1.031 ± 0.075 mi)
- Mean density: 550±80 kg/m^{3}
- Absolute magnitude (H): 7.22
- Comet total magnitude (M1): 9.2
- Comet nuclear magnitude (M2): 13.3

77P/Longmore is a Jupiter-family comet with a 6.9-year orbit around the Sun. It is the only comet discovered by Australian astronomer, Andrew Jonathan Longmore.

== Observational history ==
It was discovered by Andrew Jonathan Longmore on a photographic plate taken on 10 June 1975 at the 1.22m Schmidt telescope at Siding Spring Observatory, New South Wales, Australia. Its brightness was estimated at an apparent magnitude of 17. After further observations Brian G. Marsden was able to calculate the perihelion date at 4 November 1975 and the orbital period as 6.98 years.

The next perihelion date was computed to be 21 October 1981. Tsutomu Seki relocated the comet on 2 January 1981 with a brightness of magnitude 18. It has since been observed in 1988, 1995, 2002 and 2009.

On 17 October 1963, the comet had passed 0.1577 AU (23.59 million km; 14.66 million mi) from Jupiter.

During the 2023 perihelion passage the comet brightened to about apparent magnitude 14–15.

== Physical characteristics ==
Infrared observations from the Spitzer Space Telescope in 2006 and 2007 revealed that the nucleus of Comet Longmore is roughly 1.66 km (1.03 mi) in radius, with an absolute magnitude (H) of 7.22 and a density of 550±80 kg/m^{3}.

Numbered comets
Previous; 76P/West–Kohoutek–Ikemura	77P/Longmore	Next; 78P/Gehrels
