= Maselspoort =

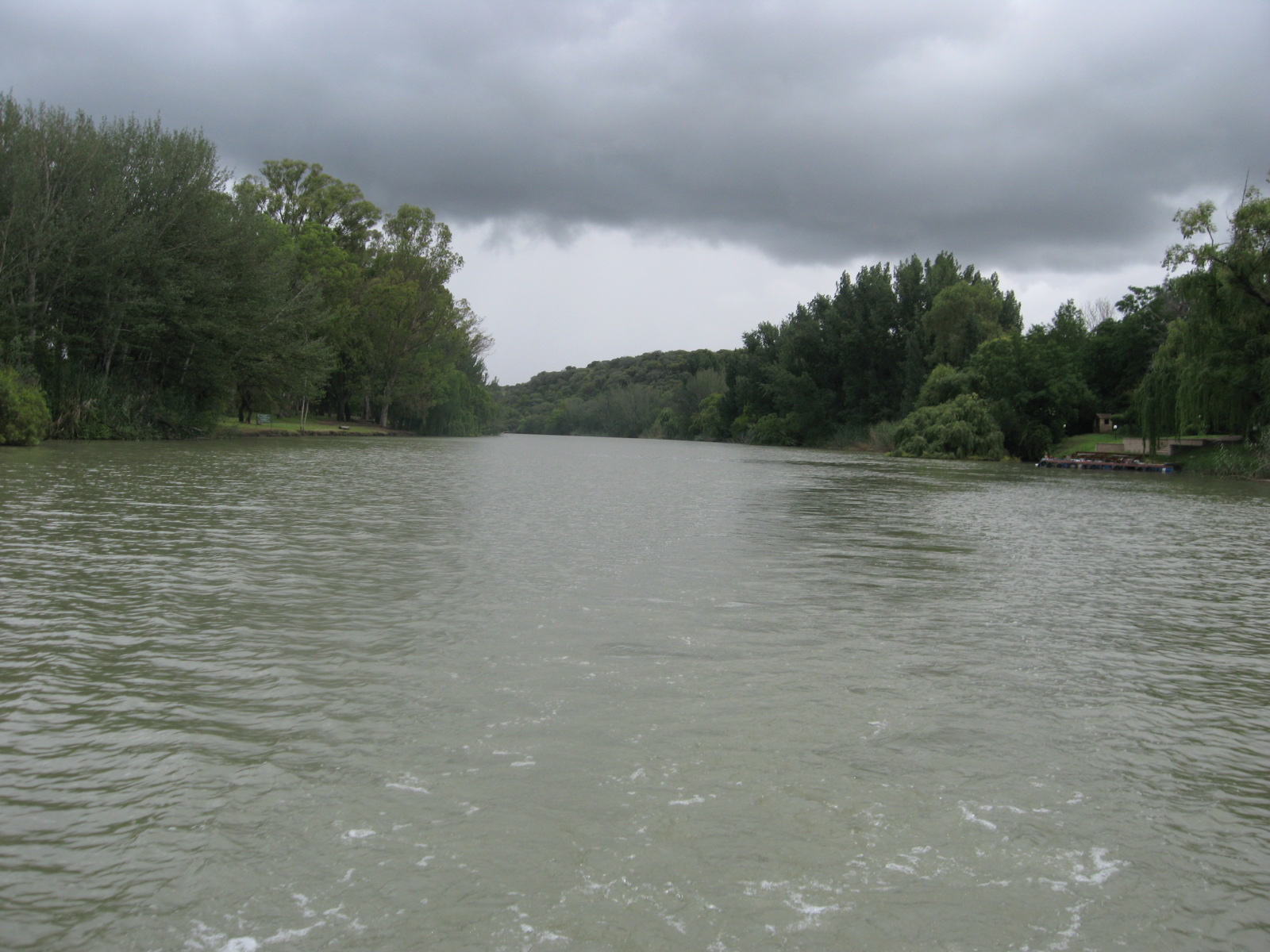
- View of the Mazelspoort Dam

- Location within Free State (South African province) Location within South Africa
- Coordinates: 29.036167°S 26.402567°E
- Country: South Africa
- Province: Free State
- Municipality: Mangaung
- Time zone: UTC+2 (SAST)

Maselspoort is a resort complex in Mangaung in the Free State province of South Africa.

Maselspoort is situated on the banks of the Modder River, 23 km (14 mi) from Bloemfontein. It is a popular resort town for Bloemfontein city dwellers, and a popular fishing spot.

It was originally known as "Mazel's Pass", after a Mr Mazel who owned the land. In 1904 a major water works was opened at Maselspoort, and in 1927 Harvard University erected the Boyden Observatory. The then-Prince George of England stopped at Maselspoort in 1934 as part of a visit to Bloemfontein.
