= C/1959 Y1 (Burnham) =

Parabolic comet

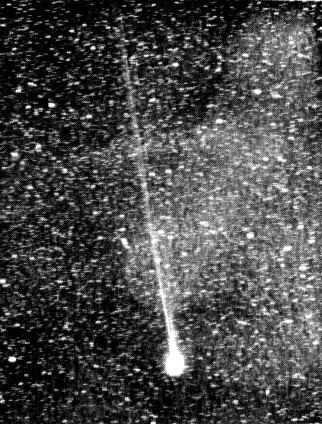
- Comet Burnham photographed by Alan McClure on 22 April 1960.

Discovery
- Discovered by: Robert Burnham Jr.
- Discovery site: Lowell Observatory
- Discovery date: 30 December 1959

Designations
- Alternative designations: 1960 II, 1959k

Orbital characteristics
- Epoch: 4 April 1960 (JD 2437028.5)
- Observation arc: 148 days
- Number of observations: 35
- Perihelion: 0.5044 AU
- Eccentricity: 1.00029
- Inclination: 159.601°
- Longitude of ascending node: 252.643°
- Argument of periapsis: 306.632°
- Last perihelion: 20 March 1960
- Earth MOID: 0.1947 AU
- Jupiter MOID: 0.5355 AU

Physical characteristics
- Spectral type: (B–R) = 0.31±0.08
- Comet nuclear magnitude (M2): 15.9
- Apparent magnitude: 3.5 (1960 apparition)

Comet Burnham, formally designated as C/1959 Y1, is a non-periodic comet that became visible to the naked eye in 1960. It is one of six comets discovered by American astronomer, Robert Burnham Jr. It brightened up to a magnitude of 3.5.

== Observational history ==
The comet was discovered in a photographic plates obtained by the Lowell Observatory in Arizona as part of the Lowell Proper Motion Survey program on 29−30 December 1959. Robert Burnham Jr. noticed in one of them a fairly bright, diffuse trail. He estimated its apparent magnitude to be 11. The presence of the comet was confirmed by Lick Observatory on 1 and 2 January 1960, and by Lowell observatory on 2 January. Henry L. Giclas, Lowell observatory, estimated its magnitude to be 14. The comet then was three months before perihelion and 1.71 AU (256 million km) from the Sun.

The comet appeared moderately condensed in images obtained in early January, but the central condensation became more pronounced by the end of the month. On 28 January Elizabeth Roemer reported that the comet has a coma 1.3' across, and two tails, one short, curved tail extending 3' long, and a narrow, straight tail 15' long. On 9 March the comet reached its minimum elongation, being 8 degrees from the Sun, and continued to move southwards until 21 March, reaching a declination of -13°. The perihelion of the comet was on 20 March 1960.

The comet was recovered on 25 March in the morning twilight. Its magnitude was estimated visually by Roemer to be 7 on 4 April. In the start of April no tail was visible visually, but Alan McClure detected a very faint tail 3 degrees long in a photographic plate obtained in blue light. The comet was brightening as it was approaching Earth. On 13 April, George van Biesbroeck estimated its magnitude to 5.3 and on 18 April to be 4.7. On 22 April the tail was reported to be 2.5° long visually and 7.4° in photographic plates exposed in blue light. The comet was reported to have reached an apparent magnitude of 3.5 on 26 April. Closest approach took place on 27 April, at a distance of 0.20 AU (30 million km).

After the perigee, the comet faded rapidly and on 1 May van Biesbroeck estimated its magnitude to be 4.8. On 3 May its photographic magnitude was estimated to be 6.5 by Arend, while a tail was also imaged. On 14 May the photographic magnitude had dropped to 10. The comet was last detected in images obtained on 17 June by Roemer at the US Naval Observatory. It was described as essentially stellar with a magnitude of 18.

== Orbit ==
A 2022 study calculated that the comet has a minimum orbit intersection distance of around 0.08 AU (12 million km) with 28978 Ixion.
