= Paraskevopoulos (crater) =

Lunar Crater

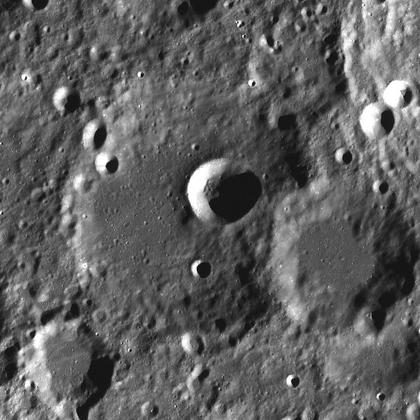
- LRO image
- Coordinates: 50.4°N 149.9°W
- Diameter: 94 km
- Depth: Unknown
- Colongitude: 152° at sunrise
- Eponym: John S. Paraskevopoulos

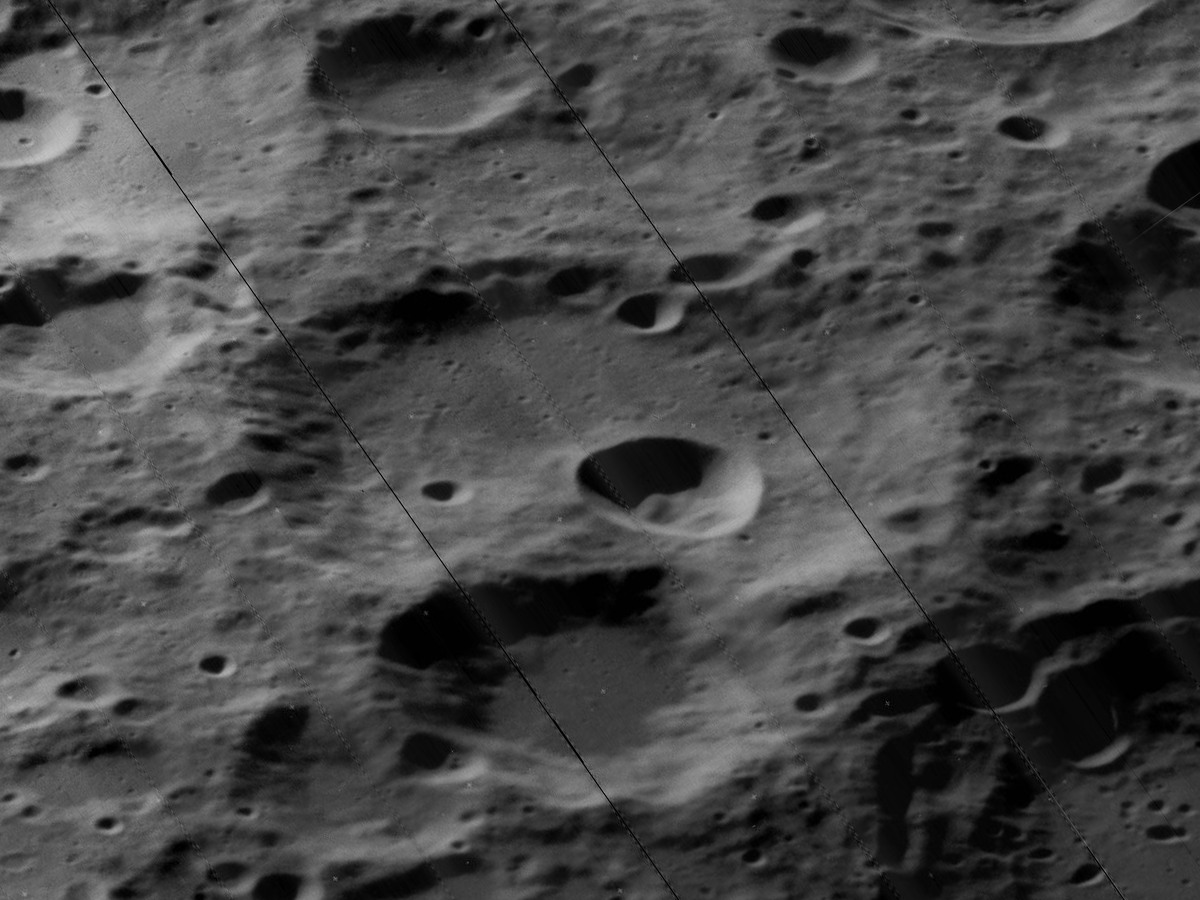
Oblique Lunar Orbiter 5 image

Paraskevopoulos is an old lunar impact crater that is located on the far side of the Moon, in the higher northern latitudes. It lies just to the southwest of the younger and somewhat larger crater Carnot. To the southwest is the smaller crater Stoletov, and to the southeast lies Fowler. It is named after the astronomer John S. Paraskevopoulos.

This is a well-eroded crater formation, with a rounded and uneven rim edge. The satellite crater Paraskevopoulos H lies across the eastern rim, and the smaller Paraskevopoulos E is located in the northeastern part of the interior floor. The rim edge is better defined along the northern and southern edges, and is nearly worn away along the west. The surviving interior floor is relatively level and featureless, with only a pair of small craterlets along the northwestern and southeastern edges.

== Satellite craters ==
By convention these features are identified on lunar maps by placing the letter on the side of the crater midpoint that is closest to Paraskevopoulos.

Paraskevopoulos	Latitude	Longitude	Diameter
E	50.6° N	149.4° W	24 km
H	49.7° N	147.2° W	48 km
N	47.2° N	150.8° W	26 km
Q	48.6° N	152.3° W	35 km
R	48.6° N	154.7° W	23 km
S	49.1° N	154.9° W	67 km
U	50.4° N	154.7° W	30 km
X	53.6° N	152.2° W	26 km
Y	53.1° N	150.4° W	46 km
