= C/1941 B2 (de Kock–Paraskevopoulos) =

Non-periodic comet

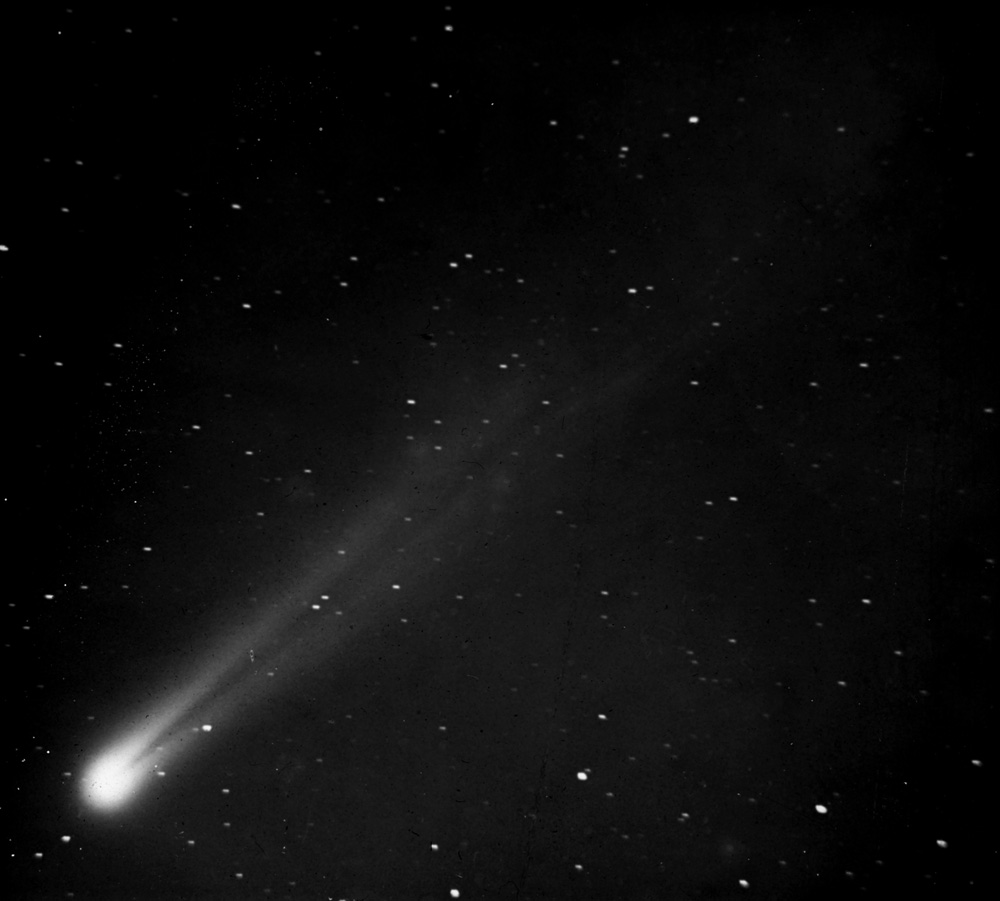
- The comet on 16 February 1941 by Yerkes Observatory

Discovery
- Discovered by: Reginald Purdon de Kock; John S. Paraskevopoulos
- Discovery date: 15 January 1941

Designations
- Alternative designations: 1941 IV, 1941c

Orbital characteristics
- Epoch: 1941-Feb-15.0
- Observation arc: 241 days
- Aphelion: 1,760 AU
- Perihelion: 0.79 AU
- Eccentricity: 0.9991
- Inclination: 168.2°
- Longitude of ascending node: 43.1°
- Argument of periapsis: 268.7°
- Last perihelion: 27 January 1941

Physical characteristics
- Mean radius: 1.31 km (0.81 mi) (Note: Calculated mean radius using the formula: $\log_{10}\,(\,R\,)\ =\;0.9 +\;0.13 (\,H\,)$ Where $\,H\,$ is the comet's absolute total magnitude (M1))
- Comet total magnitude (M1): 6.0
- Apparent magnitude: 2.0 (1941 apparition)

Comet de Kock–Paraskevopoulos (also known with the designations C/1941 B2, 1941 IV, 1941c) is a non-periodic comet discovered on 15 January 1941. The comet reached an apparent magnitude of about +2.

== Observational history ==
The comet was first observed by Reginald Purdon de Kock in Paarl, South Africa while he was observing variable star R Lupi on 15 January 1941 and notified the Royal Observatory. He estimated the comet had a magnitude of 5.8 and its tail was half a degree long. The comet was independently discovered by Frank Skjellerup in Melbourne on 20 January and confirmed the discovery the next day, while a person named Barnes also notified Melbourne Observatory about the comet on 21 January. John S. Paraskevopoulos of the Harvard College Observatory in Bloemfontein, unaware of the other discoveries, found the comet on 23 January and sent immediately a radiogram in Harvard College, and thus the comet became known in the United States as comet Paraskevopoulos.

The comet brightened rapidly to a magnitude of 2 to 3 the next days, while its tail was reported to be about 5 degrees long. The comet reached its perihelion on 27 January and two days later was the closest approach to Earth, at a distance of 0.2655 AU. On 27 January the comet also reached its southernmost declination, at -57°. On that day, Harley Weston Wood reported a magnitude of 3.26 at a tail length of 5° by naked eye. The comet brightened a bit more the following days, with Ronald Alexander McIntosh reporting magnitude 2.2 and a tail length of 6 degrees on 31 January.

In February the comet began to fade, as it was moving away both from Earth and the Sun. The tail appeared bent the first days of the month. By the mid of February the comet had faded to a magnitude of about 5 and stopped being visible with naked eye. In March the solar elongation decreased and the comet passed 0.6 degrees from the Sun on April 28. The comet was recovered on 4 July by George van Biesbroeck and was last detected on 27 September 1941.
