= 57P/du Toit–Neujmin–Delporte =

Periodic comet with 6 year orbit

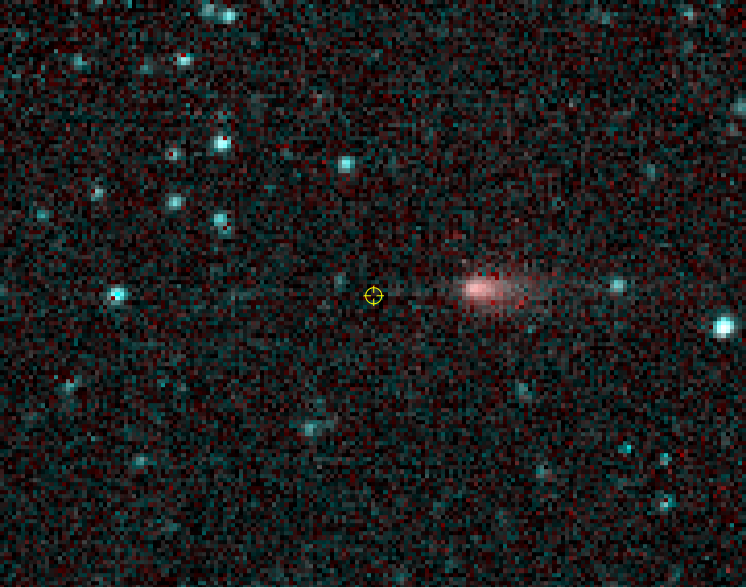
- Infrared image of Comet du Toit–Neujmin–Delporte taken by NEOWISE on 13 June 2015

Discovery
- Discovered by: Daniel du Toit; Grigory N. Neujmin; Eugène Joseph Delporte
- Discovery date: 18 July 1941

Designations
- MPC designation: P/1941 O1, P/1941 OE; P/1970 N2, P/1983 RD_{6}
- Alternative designations: 1941 VII, 1970 XIII; 1983 IX, 1989 XIV; 1941e, 1970i, 1983g; 1989l

Orbital characteristics
- Epoch: 21 November 2025 (JD 2461000.5)
- Observation arc: 81.55 years
- Number of observations: 2,146
- Aphelion: 5.166 AU
- Perihelion: 1.714 AU
- Semi-major axis: 3.440 AU
- Eccentricity: 0.50175
- Orbital period: 6.381 years
- Inclination: 2.854°
- Longitude of ascending node: 188.71°
- Argument of periapsis: 115.05°
- Mean anomaly: 231.15°
- Last perihelion: 17 October 2021
- Next perihelion: 3 March 2028
- T_{Jupiter}: 2.917
- Earth MOID: 0.714 AU
- Jupiter MOID: 0.299 AU

Physical characteristics
- Mean radius: 0.78 km (0.48 mi) (A)
- Comet total magnitude (M1): 8.5

57P/du Toit–Neujmin–Delporte is the designation of a periodic comet. It is a member of the Jupiter family of comets whose orbits and evolution are strongly influenced by the giant planet. In 2002, it was discovered to have broken up into at least 20 fragments. At the time of their discovery, these shed fragments were spread out along the orbital path subtending an angle of 27 arcminutes from the comet's surviving head.

== Discovery ==
The comet has many co-discoverers and a complicated discovery history due to unreliable communications during World War II. Daniel du Toit discovered the comet (retrospectively designated as P/1941 O1) on July 18, 1941, working at Boyden Station, South Africa. His cabled message about the comet did not reach his employer, Harvard College Observatory, until July 27. During a routine asteroid search, Grigory N. Neujmin (Simeis Observatory, Soviet Union) found the comet on a photographic plate exposed on 25 July. He confirmed his own observation on 29 July, but the radiogram from Moscow took 20 days to reach Harvard. The official announcement of the new comet finally happened on August 20, 1941. A few days later, it became known that Eugène Joseph Delporte at the Royal Observatory in Belgium, also had found the comet on 19 August, so he was added to the list of discoverers.

A few weeks later, news from Paul Ahnert at Sonneberg, Thuringia, Germany, reached Harvard that he also observed the new comet on July 22, but it was too late to recognize his contribution.

Fragment A was last observed in 2002.

Numbered comets
Previous; 56P/Slaughter–Burnham	57P/du Toit–Neujmin–Delporte	Next; 58P/Jackson–Neujmin
