= C/1957 U1 (Latyshev–Wild–Burnham) =

Parabolic comet

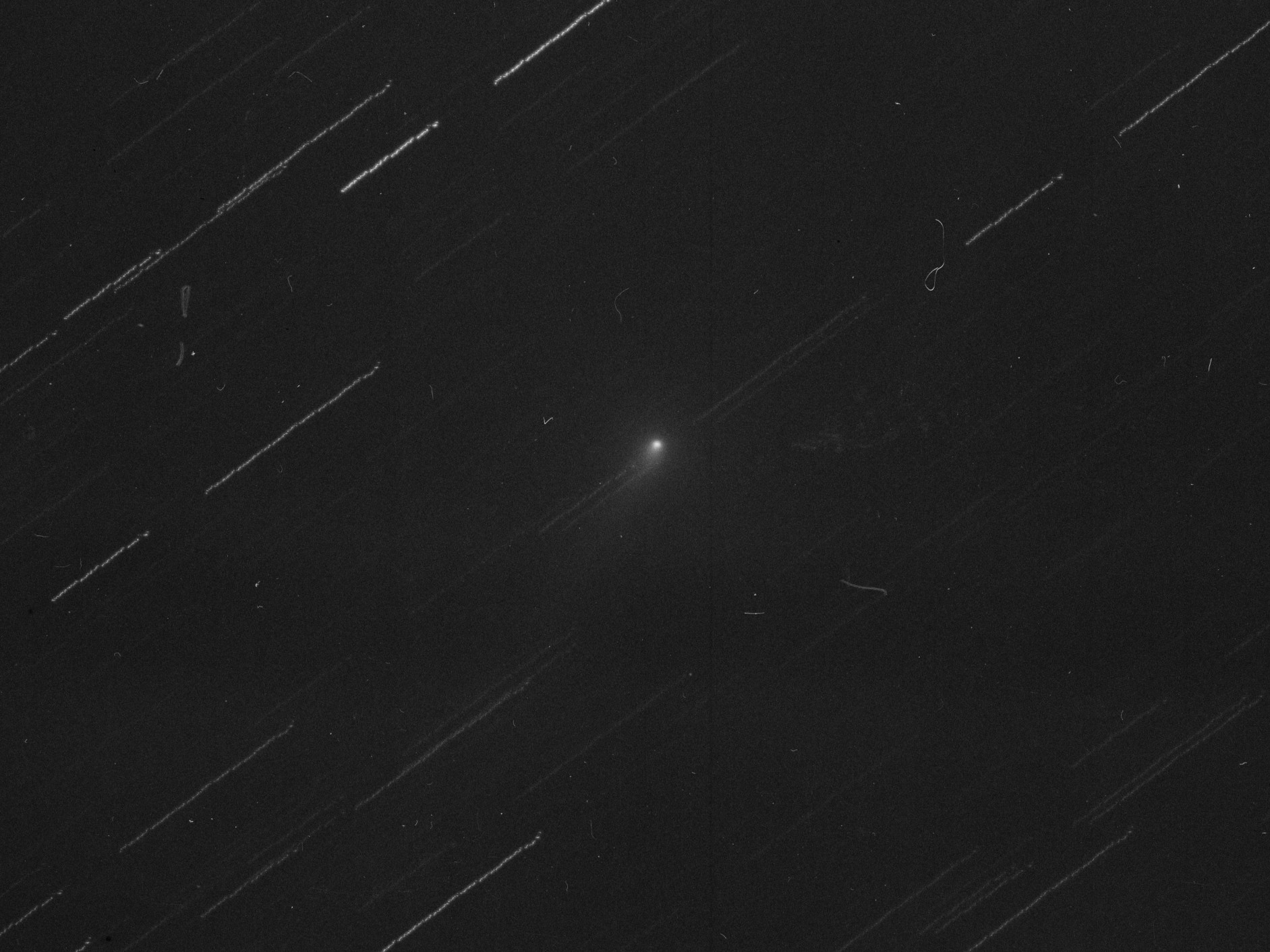
- The comet taken from the Heidelberg Observatory on 20 October 1957

Discovery
- Discovered by: Ivan N. Latyshev; Paul Wild; Robert Burnham Jr.
- Discovery site: Askhabad, USSR; Bern, Switzerland; Arizona, USA
- Discovery date: 16–19 October 1957

Designations
- Alternative designations: 1957 IXZ 1957f

Orbital characteristics
- Epoch: 5 December 1957 (JD 2436177.6293)
- Observation arc: 23 days
- Earliest precovery date: 2 October 1957
- Number of observations: 9
- Perihelion: 0.539 AU
- Eccentricity: ~1.000
- Inclination: 156.715°
- Longitude of ascending node: 210.875°
- Argument of periapsis: 277.614°
- Last perihelion: 5 December 1957

Physical characteristics
- Comet total magnitude (M1): 10.6
- Apparent magnitude: 6.0 (1957 apparition)

Comet Latyshev–Wild–Burnham, also known as C/1957 U1, is a faint parabolic comet that was observed during the third week of October 1957. It was the first comet discovered by American astronomer Robert Burnham Jr., which he co-discovered alongside Turkmen astronomer, Ivan N. Latyshev, and Swiss astronomer, Paul Wild.

== Discovery and observations ==
The comet was first spotted by Ivan N. Latyshev while observing an RR Lyr variable star named X Arietis on the night of 16 October 1957. He estimated its apparent magnitude to be 8. It was then independently discovered by Robert Burnham Jr. three days later, where he reported his observation to the Lowell Observatory for verification. Unfavorable weather conditions prevented follow-up observations to be conducted at Lowell to confirm Burnham's find, however its existence was verified when reports came that Paul Wild spotted the comet a few hours before Burnham did. Their respective discoveries were eventually announced by the International Astronomical Union on 23 October 1957. Precovery images by the Sonneberg Sky Patrol dating from 2, 3, and 5 October were found.

The comet's closest approach to Earth took place on 21 October 1957, at a distance of 0.13 astronomical units (19,000,000 km; 12,000,000 mi). The comet on 20 October was reported be 6 by W. Wenzel, and 6.2 by E. Leutenegger. P. Finsler noted the comet had a short tail. The comet was last observed on 25 October, when the comet was near the border of the southern constellations of Grus and Microscopium by Henry L. Giclas in two photographic exposures, appearing as a fuzzy trail. Elizabeth Roemer tried unsuccessfully to recover the comet on 17 February 1958.

== Orbit ==
The very few observations conducted for the comet had made orbital calculations difficult to determine. However, the prediscovery ephemerides from the Sonneberg Observatory enabled Michael P. Candy to calculate a parabolic trajectory for the comet on 23 October 1957. This was followed-up by Brian G. Marsden and Ichiro Hasegawa a month later, however there were large differences remaining in the calculations.

It made its closest approach with Earth on 21 October 1957, when it came within 0.1257 AU (18.80 million km) from our planet. Based on Candy's calculations, the comet should have reached perihelion by 5 December 1957, provided it had not disintegrated beforehand.

== Meteor shower ==
In 2014, a newly discovered meteor shower consisting of 45 meteors were found to have similar mean orbits with the comet C/1957 U1, potentially indicating that the comet might have a highly eccentric elliptical orbit instead of a parabolic trajectory. This meteor shower, called the Kappa Aurigids, is active between 11 and 31 October of each year, reaching peak activity on 20 October.
