= John S. Paraskevopoulos =

Greek and South African astronomer (1889–1951)

John Stefanos Paraskevopoulos
- Ιωάννης Στέφανος Παρασκευόπουλος
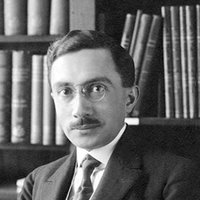
- John S. Paraskevopoulos (circa 1940)
- Born: Ioannis Stefanos Paraskevopoulos; 20 June 1889; Piraeus, Kingdom of Greece
- Died: 15 March 1951 (aged 61); Bloemfontein, Union of South Africa
- Other name: John Paras
- Citizenship: Greek citizenship; South African citizenship
- Education: National and Kapodistrian University of Athens
- Spouse: Dorothy W. Block (m. 1921)
- Awards: Commander of the Phoenix
- Scientific career
- Fields: astronomy
- Workplaces: National Observatory of Athens; Yerkes Observatory; Mount Wilson Observatory; Boyden Station; Boyden Observatory
- Thesis: Variability in absorption spectra
- Doctoral advisor: Timoleon Argyropoulos

John Stefanos Paraskevopoulos (Greek: Ιωάννης Στέφανος Παρασκευόπουλος; June 20, 1889 – March 15, 1951) also known as John Paras, was a Greek and South African astronomer. He spent most of his career in the Boyden Observatory, for the establishment of which he played a crucial role.

He was born in Piraeus, Kingdom of Greece and graduated from the University of Athens, where he obtained his PhD in physics in 1910, under the supervision of Timoleon A. Argyropoulos. His thesis was entitled "Variability in absorption spectra". After his graduation he spent several years as laboratory assistant in Physics and Chemistry at the University of Athens, with King George II attending laboratory courses under him at that time.

His scientific career was interrupted by nine years of military service in the Greek army during the Balkan Wars and World War I. This prevented him proceeding abroad with a scholarship he had won in 1912. He ended his military career with the rank of First Lieutenant and received multiple war medals including thirteen bars for battles in which he had fought. During part of his military service he was an instructor in navigation at the National Observatory of Athens. He worked as an assistant of Prof. Demetrios Eginitis at the National Observatory of Athens, and in 1919, he went to the US with a two-year fellowship, spending part of that time working at Yerkes Observatory. There he met and married Dorothy W. Block. He also worked for several months at the Mount Wilson Observatory and at the United States Weather Bureau in Washington D.C.

In 1921, he returned to Athens where he became head of the astronomy department of the National Observatory of Athens with a goal to build a large telescope in Greece. However, due to the Greco-Turkish War during that period and the political instability that followed it soon became evident that the large telescope for the observatory would not materialise.

In September 1923, Dr Paras accepted an offer from Dr Harlow Shapley, to become the Superintendent of the Harvard Observatory's Southern Station. He left this post due to a lack of funding and went to Arequipa, Peru to work at Boyden Station, a branch of Harvard Observatory, with a view to finding a more suitable location for it. The decision was made to move Boyden Station to the Union of South Africa due to better weather conditions, and Paraskevopoulos served there as director of Boyden Observatory in South Africa from 1927 to 1951, the year of his death. While in South Africa he was an extramural Professor of Astronomy at the University of the Orange Free State and he was given an honorary degree of Master of Arts from Harvard University. In 1950, he was awarded the medal of Commander of Order of the Phoenix, one of the greatest honours awarded by Greece.

John Paraskevopoulos was a member of multiple scientific societies, including the Royal Astronomical Society, the American Astronomical Society, the South African Association for the Advancement of Science and the Societe Astronomique de France.

He co-discovered a couple of comets, including C/1941 B2 (de Kock–Paraskevopoulos), which became visible with naked eye. The crater Paraskevopoulos on the Moon and the asteroid 5298 Paraskevopoulos are named after him.
