= C/1945 X1 (du Toit) =

Kreutz sungrazer comet

Discovery
- Discovered by: Daniel du Toit
- Discovery site: Bloemfontein, South Africa
- Discovery date: 11 December 1945

Designations
- Alternative designations: 1945 VII, 1945g

Orbital characteristics
- Epoch: 29 December 1945 (JD 2431817.4652)
- Observation arc: 4 days (short arc)
- Number of observations: 4 (small sample size)
- Orbit type: Kreutz sungrazer (Population II)
- Perihelion: 0.00752 AU (1.62 R_{☉})
- Eccentricity: 1.0 (assumed)
- Max. orbital speed: 489 km/s
- Inclination: 141.87°
- Longitude of ascending node: 351.20°
- Argument of periapsis: 72.062°
- Last perihelion: 27 December 1945

Physical characteristics
- Mean radius: 0.6 km (0.37 mi)
- Mass: 3.90×10^{14} kg
- Mean density: 0.35 g/cm^{3} (assumed)
- Apparent magnitude: 7.0 (1945 apparition)

Comet du Toit, formal designation C/1945 X1, is a sungrazing comet that was observed four times by South African astronomer, Daniel du Toit, in December 1945. The comet is a member of the Kreutz sungrazer family. It passed about 400,000 km (250,000 mi) from the surface of the Sun.

== Discovery and observations ==
The comet was discovered by Daniel du Toit from the Harvard College Observatory of Bloemfontein, South Africa shortly after midnight on 11 December 1945, where he estimated its brightness as a 7th-magnitude object. He only managed to make four observations of the comet in the following nights, during which the comet rapidly moved towards the Sun. At the beginning of January 1946, Leland E. Cunningham calculated a preliminary orbit from du Toit's observation data, and concluded that the comet may have reached perihelion by 27–28 December 1945 which should have been a "brilliant object in the naked eye". However, a subsequent search on coronagraph images showed no signs of the comet, even at positions predicted by Cunningham.

It is not certain whether or not the comet fully disintegrated during perihelion or it survived but simply remained unobserved.

== Orbit ==
It has a very short observation arc of 4 days based on 4 observations and an assumed eccentricity of 1.0. In 1967, Brian G. Marsden initially determined several possible parabolic orbits of comets (including du Toit) that were similar to that of C/1882 R1 and C/1965 S1 (Ikeya–Seki). A follow-up study in 1989 had determined those comets belong to the Superfragment II of the Kreutz sungrazers, with du Toit possibly forming sometime in 1700. The other members of the Kreutz Superfragment II group were C/1963 R1 (Pereyra) and C/1970 K1 (White–Ortiz–Bolelli)

Orbital calculations predicted its perihelion on 27 December 1945 at a distance of 0.0075 AU (1.12 million km) from the Sun, however it wasn't recovered, leading to astronomers to conclude it had disintegrated, similar to most of the comets that SOHO observed decades later. Had it survived perihelion, it would have been closest to Earth by 16 January 1946 at a distance of 0.54 AU (81 million km).

== See also ==
- Kreutz sungrazer
  - C/2024 S1 (ATLAS) – another Kreutz comet discovered from the ground but disintegrated upon perihelion
