= 56P/Slaughter–Burnham =

Jupiter-family comet

Discovery
- Discovered by: Charles D. Slaughter; Robert Burnham Jr.
- Discovery date: 27 January 1959

Designations
- MPC designation: P/1959 B1; P/1969 V1
- Alternative designations: 1958 VI, 1970 V; 1981 XVIII, 1993 X

Orbital characteristics
- Epoch: 21 November 2025 (JD 2461000.5)
- Observation arc: 58.99 years (Note: Observation arc from the Minor Planet Center database only covered dates from 2 February 1959 until 23 January 2018 (58.97 years). This figure includes its entire arc up to 27 January 1959.)
- Number of observations: 2,141
- Aphelion: 7.636 AU
- Perihelion: 2.489 AU
- Semi-major axis: 5.063 AU
- Eccentricity: 0.50822
- Orbital period: 11.392 years
- Inclination: 8.155°
- Longitude of ascending node: 345.87°
- Argument of periapsis: 44.235°
- Mean anomaly: 294.36°
- Last perihelion: 18 July 2016
- Next perihelion: 19 December 2027
- T_{Jupiter}: 2.710
- Earth MOID: 1.518 AU
- Jupiter MOID: 0.022 AU

Physical characteristics
- Mean radius: 3.0 km (1.9 mi)
- Mean density: 640±100 kg/m^{3}
- Comet total magnitude (M1): 9.3
- Comet nuclear magnitude (M2): 13.4

56P/Slaughter–Burnham is a Jupiter-family comet with an 11.54-year orbit around the Sun. It is the second of two comets co-discovered by Robert Burnham Jr. and Charles D. Slaughter.

== Observational history ==
It was discovered in 1959 by Charles D. Slaughter and Robert Burnham of the Lowell Observatory, Flagstaff, Arizona during a photographic survey. They spotted the comet, with a faint brightness of magnitude 16, on a plate exposed on 10 December 1958. By monitoring its movement over a series of consecutive days, Elizabeth Roemer was able to calculate its orbit, suggesting a perihelion date of 4 August 1958 and an orbital period of 11.18 years.

It was subsequently observed in 1970, 1981, 1993, 2005 and 2016. Its next perihelion will be on 19 December 2027.

== Physical characteristics ==
The nucleus of the comet has a radius of 1.55 km (0.96 mi) based on observations by the Keck Observatory. Follow-up observations from the 2.5-m Isaac Newton Telescope revealed a much larger nucleus at 3.0 km (1.9 mi) in radius.

== Notes ==
Numbered comets
| Previous; 55P/Tempel–Tuttle | 56P/Slaughter–Burnham | Next; 57P/du Toit–Neujmin–Delporte |
