= Robert Burnham Jr. =

American astronomer (1931–1993)

- Robert Burnham Jr. at Lowell Observatory
- Born: June 16, 1931; Chicago, Illinois, US
- Died: March 20, 1993 (aged 61)
- Resting place: Fort Rosecrans National Cemetery
- Known for: Burnham's Celestial Handbook
- Scientific career
- Fields: Astronomy
- Workplaces: Lowell Observatory

Robert Burnham Jr. (June 16, 1931 – March 20, 1993) was an American astronomer, best known for writing the classic three-volume Burnham's Celestial Handbook. He discovered numerous asteroids, including the Mars crossing asteroid 3397 Leyla, and six comets.

Burnham's late years were tragic; he died destitute and alone. However, he is remembered by a generation of deep sky observers for his unique contribution to astronomy, the Celestial Handbook. The main-belt asteroid 3467 Bernheim was named in his honor.

== Early life and career ==
Burnham was born in Chicago, Illinois, in 1931, the son of Robert Sr. and Lydia. His family moved to Prescott, Arizona, in 1940, and he graduated from high school there in 1949. That was the culmination of his formal education. Always a shy person, he had few friends, never married, and spent most of his time observing with his home-built telescope.

In the fall of 1957 he received considerable local publicity when he discovered his first comet. This led to his being hired by Lowell Observatory in Flagstaff, Arizona, in 1958 to work on a survey of stellar proper motion using a blink comparator. While Burnham was working at Lowell, he and his co-worker, Norman G. Thomas, discovered five more comets (including 56P/Slaughter-Burnham), and in excess of 1500 asteroids.

Named Asteroids discovered: 1
3397 Leyla^{[1]}	December 8, 1964
1. ^{1} with Norman G. Thomas
Comets discovered: 6
C/1957 U1 (Latyshev–Wild–Burnham)^{[1]}^{[2]}	October 18, 1957
C/1958 D1 (Burnham)	February 22, 1958
C/1958 R1 (Burnham–Slaughter)^{[3]}	September 7, 1958
56P/Slaughter–Burnham^{[3]}	January 27, 1959
C/1959 Y1 (Burnham)	December 30, 1959
C/1960 B1 (Burnham)	January 21, 1960
1. ^{1} with Ivan N. Latyshev; 2. ^{2} with Paul Wild; 3. ^{3} with Charles D. Slaughter

== Burnham's Celestial Handbook ==
In addition to his regular duties at the observatory, Burnham spent almost all of his free time working on the Celestial Handbook. His writing and his book were never officially supported by Lowell Observatory.

Subtitled "An Observer's Guide to the Universe Beyond the Solar System," the Celestial Handbook combines a lengthy introduction to astronomy with catalog information for every constellation in the sky. Thousands of stars and deep sky objects visible in small telescopes are covered in meticulous detail.

Originally self-published in a loose-leaf serial format beginning in 1966, and with a revised edition by Dover Publications in 1978, the Celestial Handbook was well reviewed in amateur astronomy magazines and became a best seller in this specialized field. It is still in print and is considered to be a classic in the literature of amateur astronomy.

Burnham's Celestial Handbook (1978 Dover Edition)
Vol. 1

Vol. 2

Vol. 3

Due to the popularity of Celestial Handbook, Tony Ortega writing in the Phoenix New Times in 1997 described Burnham as an author "whose name has become so familiar to some readers it has become a sort of shorthand, like Audubon to birders, Hoyle to card players, Webster to poor spellers, Robert to parliamentarians." Ortega then described the book series as:

...a sort of real-life hitchhiker's guide to the galaxy, a compendium with something to say about nearly every cosmic destination worth visiting. Part travel guide, part history text, part encyclopedia, it's like a handheld natural history museum of the universe. And for decades it's held a grip on the imaginations of most people who ply the night skies with telescopes, people who yearn to travel in space and know that they can, any dark and clear night. Reading Burnham's massive, three-volume work is like reading the notes of an adventurer who has spent a lifetime studying the treasures of a lost civilization: Its 2,138 pages are loaded with tables of data, technical passages and illustrations interspersed with historical arcana and ancient poetry. And all of it is meant as an incentive for the reader to recover those treasures by merely looking upward. It is rarely compared to other books because there simply is none other like it. No other popular work approaches its utility and completeness; few other scientific texts contain its sense of wonder and even spirituality.

=== Excerpts ===
Burnham and spectra of planetary nebulae:

For the modern observer, a considerable number of interesting planetary nebulae are within range of a good amateur instrument, ranging from tiny stellar-appearing objects up to great phantom rings such as NGC 7293 in Aquarius. To identify the more stellar planetaries, the interested observer may experiment with a simple technique that impressively demonstrates their peculiar radiation: merely obtain a small piece of replica diffraction grating and place this between the eyepiece and the observer's eye. Seen in this way, all the images of stars will be drawn out into narrow colored streaks, but a planetary nebula will appear as a series of discrete individual images, each one indicating a definite wavelength in which the object is radiating. The observer should try this unusual technique on some of the smaller and brighter planetaries, such as NGC 6572 in Ophiuchus or NGC 6210 in Hercules, before attempting to identify more distant nearly stellar examples.

The color contrast of Albireo (β Cygni):

Albireo is one of the most beautiful double stars in the sky, considered by many observers to be the finest in the heavens for the small telescope. The brighter star is a golden yellow or "topaz", magnitude 3.09, spectrum K3; the "sapphire" companion is magnitude 5.11, spectrum B8 V. The separation is 34.3", an easy object for the low power telescope. Even a pair of good binoculars, if steadily held will split the pair. Albireo is noted for its superb color contrast, best seen with the eyepiece slightly displaced from the sharpest focus. Miss Agnes Clerke (1905) called the tints "golden and azure", giving perhaps "the most lovely effect of color in the heavens". For the average amateur telescope there is probably no pair so attractive, though the color effect seems to diminish in either very small or very large telescopes, or with too high a magnification. No more than 30X is required on a good 6-inch to show this superb pair as two contrasting jewels suspended against a background of glittering star-dust. The surrounding region is wonderfully rich, and for wide-angle telescopes the star clouds to the northeast are probably unequalled in splendor in the entire heavens.

Messier 22:

Messier 22 is one of the closest globulars to the galactic plane. It also lies less than a degree from the ecliptic, so astrophotographers will occasionally have an opportunity to record a bright planet in the field with the cluster; the planet Mercury, for example, passed through the field on December 12, 1977; Venus was in nearly the same position in early January, 1978. Such events are not always mentioned in astronomical publications, so the observer must make his own predictions by periodically checking planetary positions in the Nautical Almanac.

Orion Nebula:

This is the "Great Nebula in Orion", generally considered the finest example of a diffuse nebula in the sky, and one of the most wonderfully beautiful objects in the heavens. It may be seen in a pair of field glasses as a faint haze spreading out from the famous quadruple star Theta in the middle of the "Sword of Orion". In the small telescope it appears as a bright greenish mist enveloping the star. In a moderately large telescope its appearance is impressive beyond words, and draws exclamations of delight and astonishment from all who view it. The great glowing irregular cloud, shining by the gleaming light of the diamond-like stars entangled in it, makes a marvelous spectacle which is unequalled anywhere else in the sky. Barnard found it resembling a great ghostly bat as it came drifting into the field of the Yerkes telescope, and spoke of a feeling of awe and surprise each time he saw it. To many others it creates, as does no other vista of the heavens, the single overpowering impression of primeval chaos, and transports the imaginative observer back to the days of creation. This irresistible impression is more than a poetic fancy, as modern astrophysics now confirms, for the Orion Nebula is undoubtedly one of the regions in space where star formation is presently underway.

Rho Ophiuchi cloud complex:

Near the star Rho Ophiuchi, in the extreme southwest corner of the constellation, is another region of strangeness and beauty. The star itself is enmeshed in a vast diffuse nebulosity, IC 4604, too faint to be studied visually. But from this nebulous region a number of dark narrow lanes flow out toward the east, appearing like black tentacles obscuring the starry background. These vacant lanes end near the star Xi Ophiuchi, about 11° distant. Near Xi also is the large and strangely shaped dark cloud B63, thickest at its western end where scarcely a single star shows through over a field half a degree in diameter. This is an extraordinary region, described by Barnard as making a picture almost unequalled in interest in the entire heavens.

Burnham and sabi in his description of the Sagittarius Milky Way:

The indefinable mood which the Japanese call sabi, for which there is no exact English equivalent, but which might be roughly defined as that direct inward perception by which we find deep significance or great artistic quality in some outwardly simple and unpretentious object. A diamond bracelet from Tiffany's for example, might contain no sabi, while a woodcarving by a simple uneducated fisherman might be packed to the (ahem) gills with it.

Burnham, the Pleiades, and Devil's Tower:

In American Indian legend the Pleiades are connected with the Mateo Tepe or Devil's Tower, that curious and wonderfully impressive rock formation which rises like a colossal petrified tree-stump to a height of 1300 feet above the plains of northeastern Wyoming. According to the lore of the Kiowa, the Tower was raised up by the Great Spirit to protect seven Indian maidens who were pursued by giant bears; the maidens were afterwards placed in the sky as the Pleiades cluster, and the marks of the bears' claws may be seen in the vertical striations on the sides of the Tower unto this day. The Cheyenne had a similar legend.

== Life after Lowell ==
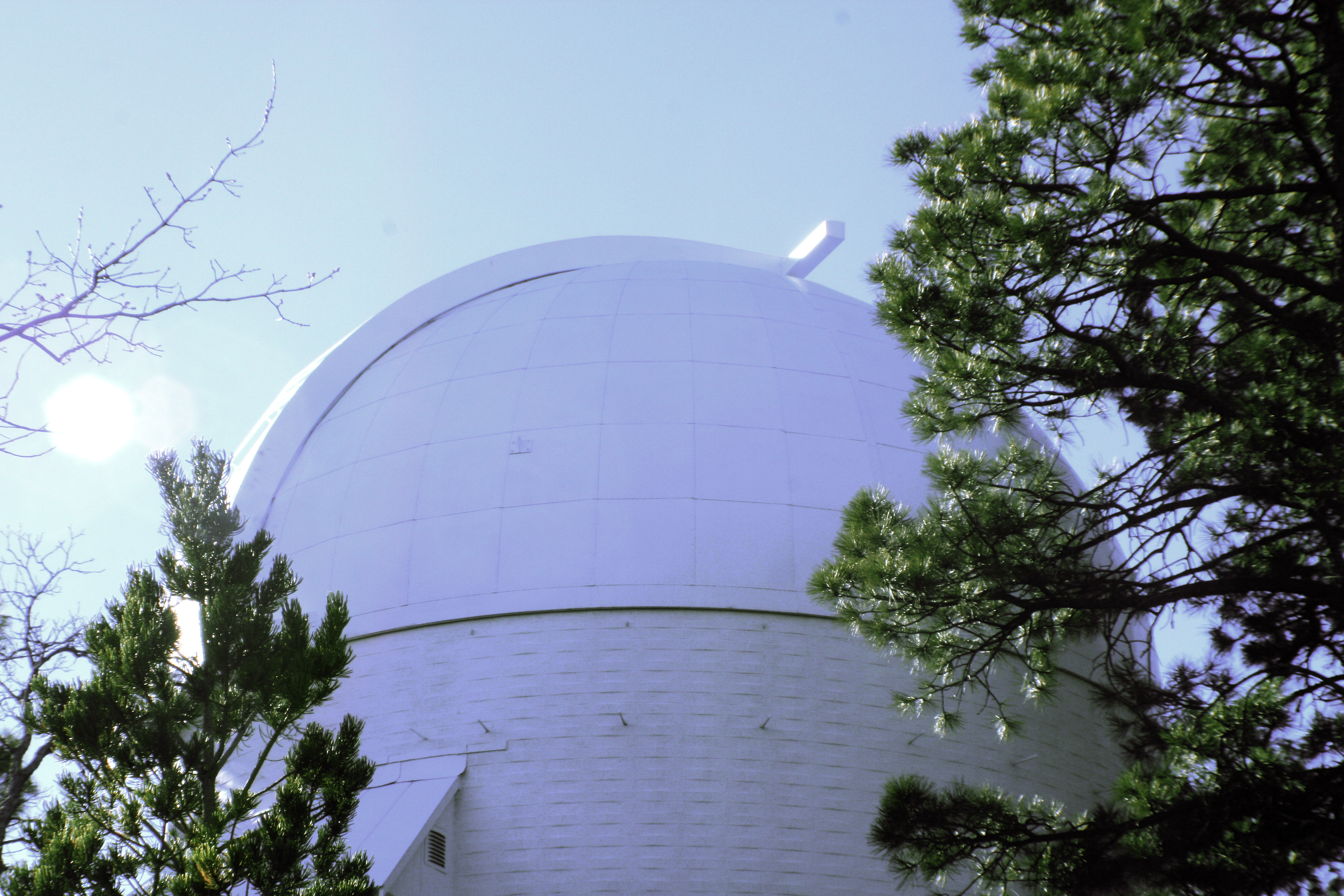
The Apollo Dome at Lowell Observatory, used for the Lunar Mapping Project

In April 1979, the year after Celestial Handbook was published by Dover, Burnham received notice that the proper motion survey would soon be completed and that the observatory could not afford to keep him on in the position he had long held. Despite months of warning, he failed to make other arrangements and, after twenty-one years at Lowell, his job ended in December of that year. Unwilling to take the only position that was offered to him, that of janitor at the observatory, he left.

Burnham was never able to recover personally, professionally, or financially after he lost the job at Lowell. Over the next few years, while sales of the Celestial Handbook were rapidly growing, Burnham's personal circumstances were steadily worsening. His shyness increased and he shunned all publicity, becoming even more reclusive. He bickered often with Dover about royalties and about the creation of possible new editions or translations of his book. He also worked sporadically on a fantasy novel – which he never completed.

Writing for the Frosty Drew Observatory in 2000, Doug Stewart said:

Had Burnham been a more astute businessman he might easily have parlayed his justifiable fame into a comfortable income. He would have been in great demand on the speakers' circuit, and could have held a top post in any planetarium in the country. He was actually quite a skilled speaker before such groups, a skill honed in over twenty years of observatory tours at Lowell. But this was not Robert Burnham, Jr. He continued to shy away from publicity, at the same time that he sought recognition for his work. His small income became less and less reliable, even while Dover's success with his guide increased (it was, and remains, a featured offering of the Astronomy Book Club).

As his situation worsened, Burnham, who was never married, became bitter and depressed, and isolated himself from his few friends and family. He had lived for a time in Phoenix, Arizona, but in May 1986 he left Phoenix and dropped out of sight completely, informing no one but his publisher of his whereabouts. Despite being the author of a successful book, Burnham spent the last years of his life in poverty and obscurity in San Diego, California, selling his paintings of cats at Balboa Park. The fans of Celestial Handbook were likely unaware of his personal circumstances, possibly assuming that a different Robert Burnham, an editor at Astronomy magazine, was the author.

== Naming of 3467 Bernheim ==
Norm Thomas, Burnham's former co-worker at Lowell Observatory, had told Burnham that he planned to name an asteroid after him. On September 26, 1981, Thomas discovered a main belt asteroid, but since asteroid 834 Burnhamia, named after the unrelated 19th century astronomer Sherburne Wesley Burnham, already carried the name, a different spelling was needed. Thomas chose the spelling Bernheim, for the Burnham family's ancestral Bohemian surname. Thus the asteroid named to honor Robert Burnham Jr. was named 3467 Bernheim.

== Death and posthumous "interview" ==
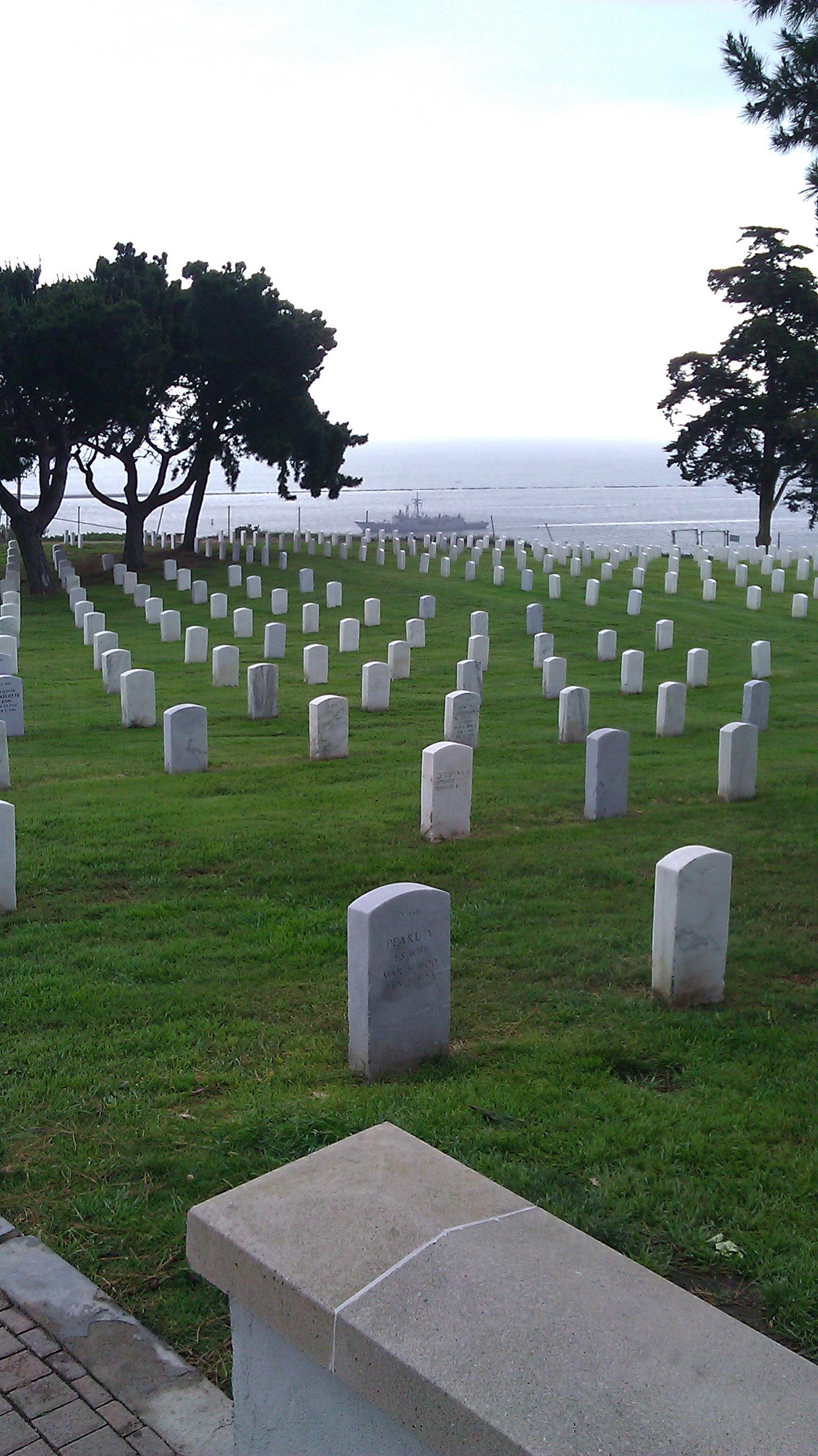
Fort Rosecrans National Cemetery

Burnham died destitute and alone at the age of sixty-one in 1993. His family did not learn about his death (apparently by his choice) until two years later, and did not report it to the press even then because they were unaware of his stature in the amateur astronomy community.

After his death, it was realized that he had often attended programs presented by the San Diego Astronomy Association (at the Ruben H. Fleet Space Theater in Balboa Park) without anyone recognizing him. In spite of the tragedy of his later years, Burnham continues to be remembered by a generation of deep sky observers for his unique Celestial Handbook. His cremated remains are interred at the Fort Rosecrans National Cemetery in San Diego, California.

In 2009, a memorial consisting of a small bronze plaque resembling a page in Burnham's Celestial Handbook was installed on the Pluto Walk at Lowell Observatory.

Burnham rarely gave interviews, but at the height of the popularity of Handbook in 1982, he wrote a piece where he playfully interviewed himself for the magazine Astronomy. A much longer version of this essay, An Interview with the author of The Celestial Handbook, dated April 1983, was discovered among Burnham's papers and it was first published in its entirety by The Village Voice in June 2011, 18 years after his death. It was introduced as follows:

If Burnham's life ended in an unfortunate fashion, in the following essay you will meet the man at his most beguiling, a largely self-taught polymath who could be both playful and cantankerous. Nearly three decades since he put these words down, his ideas about progress, science and religion, and man's future in space still seem fresh. We hope you find his words illuminating.

— Tony Ortega, Editor, The Village Voice

== Bibliography ==
Burnham's Celestial Handbook was originally self-published in a loose-leaf serial format beginning in 1966; it was issued in hardcover and later as a paperback in a three-volume, revised and enlarged edition by Dover Publications beginning in 1978.

- Burnham Jr., Robert (1978). Burnham's Celestial Handbook: An Observer's Guide to the Universe Beyond the Solar System, Volume One: Andromeda-Cetus (Revised & Enlarged ed.). New York: Dover Publications. ISBN 9780486235677.
- Burnham Jr., Robert (1978). Burnham's Celestial Handbook: An Observer's Guide to the Universe Beyond the Solar System, Volume Two: Chamaeleon-Orion (Revised & Enlarged ed.). New York: Dover Publications. ISBN 9780486235684.
- Burnham Jr., Robert (1978). Burnham's Celestial Handbook: An Observer's Guide to the Universe Beyond the Solar System, Volume Three: Pavo-Vulpecula (Revised & Enlarged ed.). New York: Dover Publications. ISBN 9780486236735.
