= Boyden Observatory =

Astronomical observatory in Bloemfontein, South Africa

- Organization: University of the Free State
- Observatory code: 074
- Location: Maselspoort, South Africa
- Coordinates: 29°02′19.79″S 26°24′17.0″E
- Altitude: 1,372 metres (4,501 ft)
- Established: 1889
- Website: Boyden Observatory

Telescopes
- Boyden-UFS Telescope: 1.5 m reflector
- Watcher Robotic Telescope: 0.4 m reflector
- Related media on Commons

Boyden Observatory is an astronomical research observatory and science education centre located in Maselspoort, 20 kilometres (12 mi) north-east of the city of Bloemfontein in Free State, South Africa. The observatory is managed by the Physics Department of the University of the Free State (UFS). The Friends of Boyden assist the observatory as a public support group, organising open evenings and protecting its public interest. Boyden also makes use of members of ASSA Bloemfontein Centre, the amateur astronomy club of the city, for presenters and telescope assistants.

== History ==
The Boyden Station of Harvard Observatory was founded in 1889 by Harvard University at Mount Harvard near Lima, Peru. It was relocated to Arequipa, Peru in October 1890 (obs. code: 800). It was named after Uriah A. Boyden, who in 1879 left in his will $238,000 to Harvard Observatory to be used for astronomical purposes. Significant work done at Arequipa include the discovery of Phoebe, an outer moon of Saturn, by William Henry Pickering using photographic plates captured with the 24 in (61 cm) Bruce Astrograph.

In 1927, the observatory was moved to its present location in South Africa. This was done because it was expected that Bloemfontein would be less cloudy than Arequipa, which after two years of recording proved to be true. The site near the settlement of Mazelspoort was formally dedicated in 1933. Its first and longtime director in South Africa was John S. Paraskevopoulos, who held the post from 1927 to 1951. Financial issues at Harvard almost led to the closure of Boyden in 1954, but several European countries became partners in funding and using the observatory. In 1975 Harvard, which had transferred the title to the Smithsonian Institution, announced it would withdraw its support in the following year. UFS agreed to support the facility, and it was donated to UFS in 1976.

== Telescopes ==
- The Boyden-UFS Telescope, which is also known as the Rockefeller Reflector, is a 60 in (150 cm) Cassegrain reflector.
- The Watcher Robotic Telescope is a 40 cm (16 in) f/14.25 robotic telescope developed by the University College Dublin and UFS. The primary function of the telescope is visual spectrum observation following Gamma-ray bursts.
- The Nishimura Telescope is a 16 in (41 cm) reflector commissioned by the Nagoya University and constructed by Nishimura Co. Ltd. in 2000. It was not in use as of 2009.
- The Alvan Clark Telescope is a 13 in (33 cm) refractor named after its maker, Alvan Clark. The telescope was first installed at Mount Wilson Observatory in 1889. It is used for outreach purposes.
- The 10 in (25 cm) Metcalf Photographic Triplet Refractor is a display item.
- A 20 cm (7.9 in) coelostat (solar telescope) is used for outreach purposes.

=== Boyden-UFS Telescope history ===
Andrew Ainslie Common figured a mirror in 1885 (and another in 1890) for a 60 in (150 cm) Newtonian reflecting telescope (later converted to a Cassegrain), but the telescope fell into disuse and was bought by the Harvard College Observatory from Common's estate. The primary mirror was re-figured in 1933, and along with a new mount it was installed at Boyden.

In the mid-1960s the Hamburg engineering firm of Heidenreich and Harbeck was contracted to build a new mirror cell for the telescope to reduce the problems experienced due to the thinness of the mirror and the fact its back surface was not flat. Shortly afterward the old Common primary mirror was replaced by a new 60 in (150 cm) mirror from Loomis made of low-expansion glass.

In 2001 the telescope received a major upgrade by DFM Engineering. This upgrade included a new control system, modifications to the mirror cell, and a new primary light shield. From 2005 to 2009 it was part of the Probing Lensing Anomalies Network.

=== Former telescopes ===
- The 0.9 m (35 in) Armagh-Dunsink-Harvard Telescope was a Schmidt–Cassegrain telescope built in 1949 by Perkin-Elmer. Three organisations were involved: Armagh Observatory, Dunsink Observatory, and Harvard. It was installed at Bloemfontein in 1950. However, it never worked well, and after several attempts to fix it, the mirrors and lens were removed in 1981 and sent to Dunsink.
- The 0.6 m (24 in) Bruce Astrograph was a refracting telescope built in 1893 by Alvan Clark & Sons. After being used for many years in Arequipa, it was brought to Bloemfontein and housed in a building with a roll-off roof. With plates taken by this telescope, Harlow Shapley discovered the Sculptor and Fornax dwarf galaxies, the first of their kind. In 1950, it was replaced by the Armagh-Dunsink-Harvard Telescope.

== Research and discoveries ==
Asteroids discovered: 4
4301 Boyden	7 August 1966
5298 Paraskevopoulos	7 August 1966
11781 Alexroberts	7 August 1966
14310 Shuttleworth	7 August 1966

Boyden Observatory performs professional astrophysics research using the 1.5 meter reflector. In addition to the research program, the observatory runs an active educational program for school children from all backgrounds as well as for members of the public, attracting thousands of visitors each year. In 1966, this observatory discovered four asteroids.

== Facilities ==
Facilities include the main building where the original offices were and where the library is, the resident astronomer's house, a state-of-the-art auditorium seating 100 people inside and 200 people on its roof for open-air sky shows, the main telescope buildings, smaller telescope buildings, a lecture room, store room, the ASSA Bloemfontein clubhouse, observation platforms, and various vantage points.

=== Proposed Extensions ===
The observatory is constantly experiencing growth in visitor numbers and the extension of its facilities. Medium term plans call for e.g. the establishment of an educational walking route for visitors to appreciate the diverse natural life in the area, a museum and science exhibition areas, upgrading of the educational telescope facilities etc. Long term plans include the construction of a digital planetarium and the completion of the fully-fledged Science Hall. A digital planetarium is open in the nearby city of Bloemfontein on Naval Hill (South Africa's first digital planetarium), inside the original dome of the Lamont-Hussey observatory.

== See also ==
- Astronomical Society of Southern Africa
- List of astronomical observatories
- South African Astronomical Observatory
