= NGC 5642 =

Galaxy in the constellation Boötes

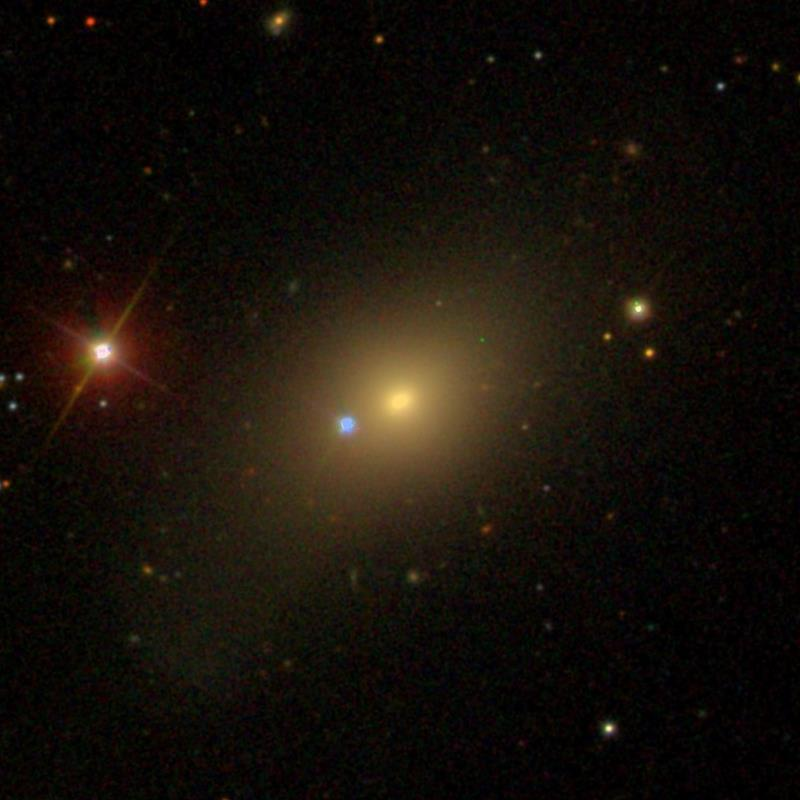

Observation data
- Constellation: Boötes
- Right ascension: 14^{h} 30^{m} 20^{s}
- Declination: +29° 54′ 41″

NGC 5642 is an elliptical galaxy in the constellation Boötes. It was discovered on May 16, 1784 by the astronomer William Herschel.
