= Lebedev (crater) =

Crater on the Moon

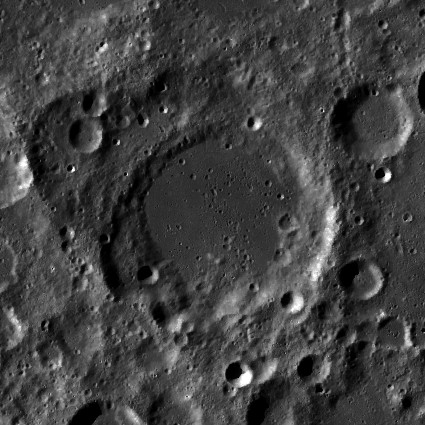
- LRO WAC image
- Coordinates: 47.3°S 107.8°E
- Diameter: 102 km
- Depth: Unknown
- Colongitude: 254° at sunrise
- Eponym: Pyotr N. Lebedev

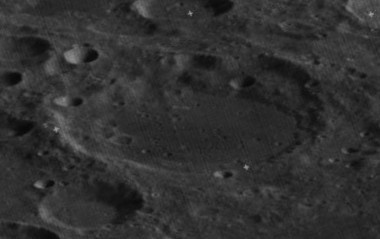
Oblique view from Lunar Orbiter 3, facing south

Lebedev is a crater on the far side of the Moon. It is named after Russian Physicist Pyotr Lebedev. It is located at the eastern edge of the irregular feature known as Mare Australe. The crater lies to the southeast of the larger, flooded Lamb, and to the east-northeast of Anuchin. To the southeast of Lebedev lies the smaller crater Cassegrain.

This is a worn and eroded crater formation with an uneven outer rim, although no significant impacts overlay the rim edge. There are a few small craterlets along the inner wall, with a pair along the southeast and another to the southwest. The most distinctive feature about this crater, however, is the dark, lava-flooded interior. This surface is pitted with many tiny craterlets and has a low ridge in the southern half, but is otherwise level and nearly featureless.

== Satellite craters ==
By convention these features are identified on lunar maps by placing the letter on the side of the crater midpoint that is closest to Lebedev.

Lebedev	Latitude	Longitude	Diameter
C	45.0° S	111.0° E	34 km
D	44.6° S	112.5° E	34 km
F	47.5° S	110.8° E	18 km
K	49.7° S	108.9° E	22 km
