= Gum (crater) =

Crater on the Moon

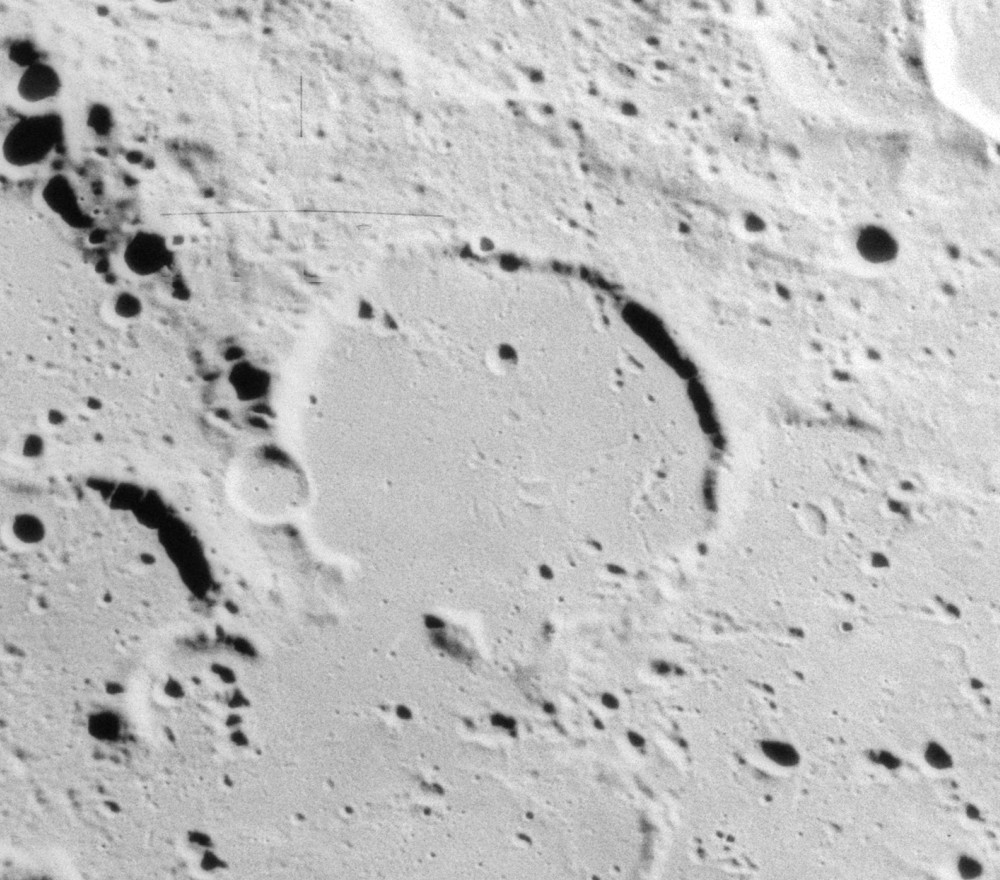
- Apollo 15 image (north at right)
- Coordinates: 40.4°S 88.6°E
- Diameter: 55 km
- Depth: Unknown
- Colongitude: 272° at sunrise
- Eponym: Colin S. Gum

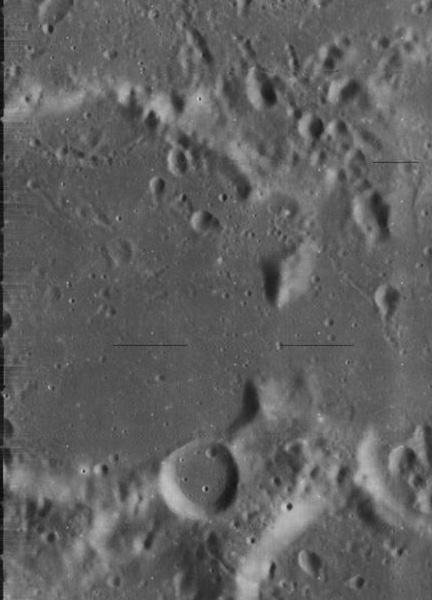
Lunar Orbiter 4 image showing the eastern 2/3 of Gum

Gum is a lunar impact crater that is located near the southeastern limb of the Moon, and is viewed nearly from the side from Earth. It lies along the western edge of the irregular Mare Australe, to the northeast of the crater Hamilton. To the north-northwest is the larger Abel, and to the east-southeast on the far side of the Moon is Jenner.

The interior floor of this crater has been completely resurfaced by lava that has entered through a break in the eastern rim. The surviving rim forms a shallow, arcing ridge about the interior. A small flooded crater lies across the southeast rim, and the remains of a small crater form an incision along the northeastern rim. The interior floor has the same low albedo as the lunar mare to the east, and is marked only by a few small craterlets.

== Satellite craters ==
By convention these features are identified on lunar maps by placing the letter on the side of the crater midpoint that is closest to Gum.

Gum	Latitude	Longitude	Diameter
S	39.8° S	85.0° E	33 km
