= Harlan (crater) =

Crater on the Moon

- Coordinates: 38.5°S 79.5°E
- Diameter: 65 km
- Depth: Unknown
- Colongitude: 282° at sunrise
- Eponym: Harlan J. Smith

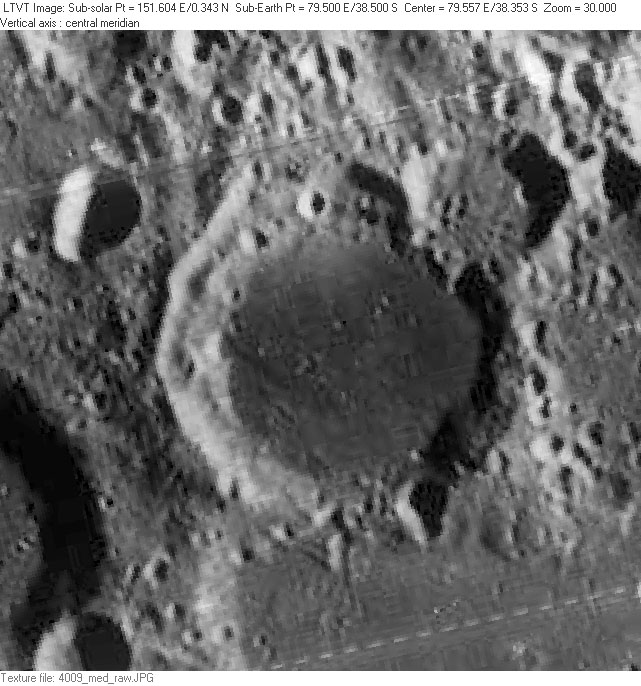
Harlan crater

Harlan is a lunar impact crater near the southeastern limb of the Moon. It is located just to the northeast of the crater Marinus. To the northeast is the flooded walled plain named Abel, and to the southeast is Mare Australe.

This crater has a worn outer rim, with a crater attached to the northeastern rim and an irregular southern edge. The inner wall has slumped to form a shelf along the northwestern side. The interior floor has been resurfaced by basaltic lava, producing a level, nearly featureless surface with a lower albedo than its surroundings.

Harlan was previously designated Marinus D before being assigned its current name by the IAU.
