= Marinus (crater) =

Crater on the Moon

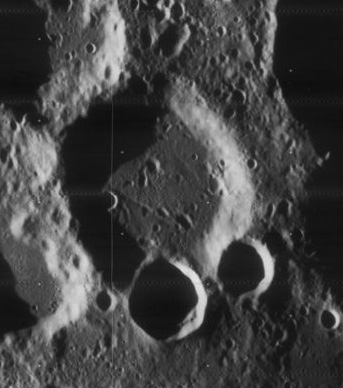
- Lunar Orbiter 4 image (slightly oblique)
- Coordinates: 39.4°S 76.5°E
- Diameter: 58 km
- Depth: Unknown
- Colongitude: 284° at sunrise
- Eponym: Marinus of Tyre

Marinus is a lunar impact crater that is located near the southeastern limb of the Moon. At this location it is viewed at an oblique angle from the Earth, limiting the amount of detail that can be observed. It lies due north of the slightly larger and dark-floored crater Oken. To the east is the northern part of the Mare Australe.

This is a considerably worn crater, although it retains its generally circular formation. A pair of smaller craters overlies most of the south-southeastern rim. Attached to the northwestern rim is Marinus R, and the crater intrudes into Marinus B to the west. Within the crater, the floor is nearly level and has a slightly lower albedo than its surroundings. The interior surface is marked by a number of tiny craterlets and dimples, as is the rim and inner wall.

== Satellite craters ==
By convention these features are identified on lunar maps by placing the letter on the side of the crater midpoint that is closest to Marinus.

| Marinus | Latitude | Longitude | Diameter |
|---|---|---|---|
| A | 39.9° S | 73.2° E | 27 km |
| B | 39.6° S | 74.8° E | 59 km |
| C | 38.0° S | 73.5° E | 37 km |
| E | 36.2° S | 76.7° E | 17 km |
| F | 41.3° S | 74.8° E | 17 km |
| G | 40.4° S | 76.6° E | 21 km |
| H | 40.2° S | 77.7° E | 16 km |
| J | 39.6° S | 71.0° E | 10 km |
| M | 37.5° S | 80.8° E | 26 km |
| N | 37.6° S | 78.4° E | 16 km |
| R | 38.0° S | 75.3° E | 44 km |

The following crater has been renamed by the IAU.

- Marinus D — See Harlan
