= Parkhurst =

Parkhurst may refer to:

== People with the surname ==
- Carolyn Parkhurst (born 1971), American author
- Charles Henry Parkhurst (1842–1933), clergyman and social reformer in New York City
- Charles Percy Parkhurst (1913–2008), American museum curator who recovered works stolen by Nazis
- Charley Parkhurst (1812–1879), American woman who, living as a man, became a stagecoach driver, rancher, and farmer
- Christopher F. Parkhurst (1854–1925), Associate Justice of the Rhode Island Supreme Court
- Frederic Hale Parkhurst (1864–1921), American politician and governor of Maine
- George A. Parkhurst (1841–1890), actor who was on stage the night John Wilkes Booth shot U.S. President Abraham Lincoln at Ford's Theatre
- Helen Parkhurst (1886–1973), American educator, author, lecturer, and television host
- Hank P. (Henry G. Parkhurst), collaborator in developing the main chapters of Alcoholics Anonymous' The Big Book; see History of Alcoholics Anonymous § Works Publishing
- John Parkhurst (c. 1512–1575), English Latin scholar and Anglican cleric who became bishop of Norwich
- John Adelbert Parkhurst (1861–1925), American astronomer
- Michael Parkhurst (born 1984), American professional soccer player

== Places ==
- Parkhurst, Gauteng, a suburb of Johannesburg
- Parkhurst, Isle of Wight, a community northwest of Newport, Isle of Wight, England
  - HM Prison Parkhurst, a jail
- Parkhurst, Queensland, a suburb of Rockhampton, Australia
- Parkhurst (Harwood, Maryland), listed on the NRHP in Anne Arundel County, Maryland, USA
- Parkhurst (crater), on the Moon

== Other uses ==
- Parkhurst Products, a Canadian confectionery and picture card company
