= Cassegrain =

Cassegrain may refer to

- Cassegrain reflector, a design used in telescopes
- Cassegrain antenna, a type of parabolic antenna
- Cassegrain (crater), on the Moon
- a Belgian canned vegetables producer now part of Bonduelle S.A.

People :

- Guillaume Cassegrain, a French sculptor
- Giovanni Cassegrain, a French sculptor
- Jean Cassegrain, a French businessman, founder of Longchamp in 1948
- Laurent Cassegrain, a Catholic priest and teacher and probably the inventor of the Cassegrain Reflector
