= Hamilton (crater) =

Crater on the Moon

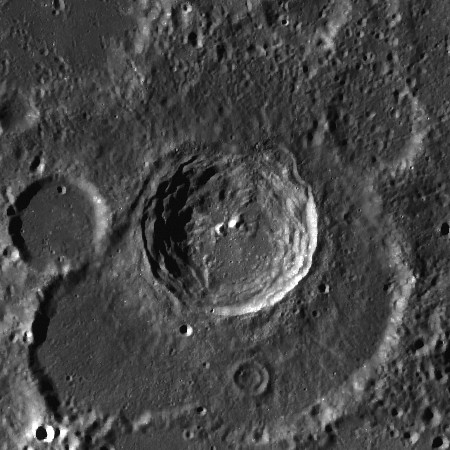
- LRO image
- Coordinates: 42.8°S 84.7°E
- Diameter: 57 km
- Depth: Unknown
- Colongitude: 279° at sunrise
- Eponym: William R. Hamilton

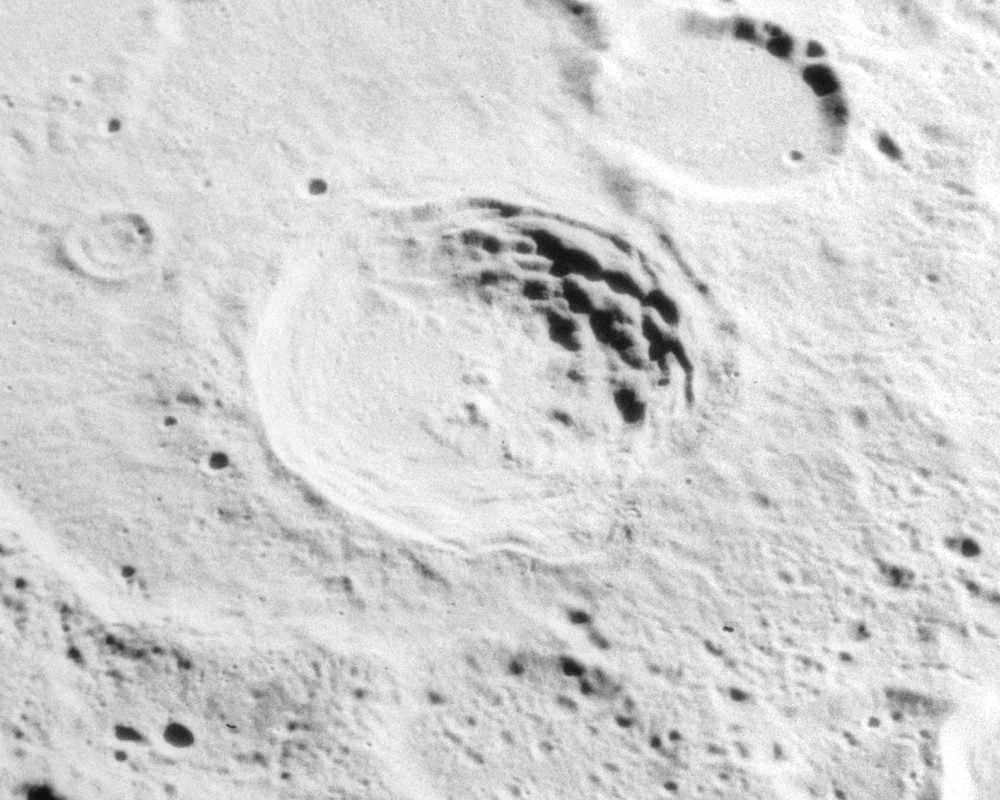
Hamilton crater from Apollo 15

Hamilton is a lunar impact crater that is located near the southeastern limb of the Moon. From the Earth this crater is viewed nearly from the edge, limiting the amount of detail that can be observed. It can also become hidden from sight due to libration, or brought into a more favorably viewing position.

This crater is situated almost due east of the lava-flooded crater Oken, near the uneven Mare Australe. To the northeast of Hamilton, along the lunar limb, is the flooded crater Gum. Less than three crater diameters to the south is a flooded walled plain called Lyot.

This is a nearly circular crater, although the rim to the north is somewhat straightened. It has a well-formed edge that has not been noticeably degraded through impact erosion. There are terraces along the interior sides, particularly along the western edge (which is hidden from view from the Earth.) The interior floor is deep and uneven, with an impact feature joining the midpoint to the north-northwestern inner wall.

To the east and southeast of this crater is a larger, arcing feature that resembles the remains of an old crater. Hamilton lies concentric with the circle in the surface that would be described by this arc. However, only the eastern portion of the old rim survives.

This crater is named after Irish mathematician William R. Hamilton (1805–1865), the inventor of the quaternion theory.

== Satellite craters ==
By convention these features are identified on lunar maps by placing the letter on the side of the crater midpoint that is closest to Hamilton.

Hamilton	Latitude	Longitude	Diameter
B	42.6° S	82.1° E	32 km
