= Leonid Brekhovskikh =

Soviet and Russian scientist (1917 - 2005)

- Born: Leonid Maksimovich Brekhovskikh; 6 May 1917; Strunkino, Russian Empire
- Died: 15 January 2005 (aged 87); Moscow, Russia
- Citizenship: Russian, Soviet
- Education: Perm State University; Lebedev Physical Institute
- Known for: Deep sound channel
- Scientific career
- Fields: Acoustical oceanography
- Workplaces: Lebedev Physical Institute; Andreev Acoustics Institute; Moscow State University; Moscow Institute of Physics and Technology; Shirshov Institute of Oceanology
- Doctoral advisor: Igor Tamm

Leonid Maksimovich Brekhovskikh (6 May 1917 – 15 January 2005; Russian: Леони́д Макси́мович Бреховски́х) was a Soviet and Russian scientist known for his work in acoustical and physical oceanography.

== Early life and education ==
Brekhovskikh was born to a peasant family in Strunkino, a small village in Vologda Governorate (now Arkhangelsk Oblast), Russia. He graduated from Perm State University in 1939, from which he received his university degree, and studied under Igor Tamm at the Lebedev Physical Institute (FIAN). There, he received his Candidate of Sciences degree (PhD) in Physics in 1941 for his thesis on X-ray crystallography. After his PhD, he joined FIAN's acoustical laboratories and worked on a naval defence project to develop protection against acoustically triggered mines. He later developed a theory of the propagation of acoustical waves in layered media, for which he received his DSc in Physics and Mathematics from FIAN in 1947.

== Research work ==
During 1946, his research in the Sea of Japan led him to the discovery of the deep sound channel, a concept which would eventually lead to the foundation of modern acoustical oceanography. This was discovered independently by Maurice Ewing and J. Lamar Worzel in the US almost at the same time. In 1953, Brekhovskikh left FIAN and founded the Andreyev Acoustics Institute in Moscow, which he directed until 1961 (he remained a department head there until his leaving, in 1980). At the Acoustics Institute, he participated in the construction and design of two acoustical research ships, the Sergey Vavilov and the Pyotr Lebedev, which participated in the POLYGON experiment along with four other ships. These ships observed the mesocale eddies for the first time, confirming the predictions made by Henry Stommel in the mid 1960s.

From 1953 to 1966, he was a professor of physics and a head of department at the Moscow State University. From 1969 until the dissolution of the Soviet Union in 1992, he was a member of the presidium of the Academy of Sciences of the Soviet Union. He also taught physics and was a head of department at the Moscow Institute of Physics and Technology from 1975 to 1997. In 1980, Brekhovskikh left the Acoustic Institute for the Shirshov Institute of Oceanology, where he led the acoustics department until his death.

== Publications ==
During his life, he wrote several books on acoustical oceanography, his most famous being Waves in Layered Media, first published in 1956. Brekhovskikh died on 15 January 2005, in Moscow, from heart failure.

== Books ==
- Brekhovskikh, L. M.; Godin, O. A. (1998). Acoustics of Layered Media I (2nd ed.). Springer. ISBN 3-540-64724-4.
- Brekhovskikh, L. M.; Godin, O. A. (1999). Acoustics of Layered Media II (2nd ed.). Springer. ISBN 3-540-65592-1.
- Brekhovskikh, L. M.; Lysanov, Yu. P. (2003). Fundamentals of Ocean Acoustics (3rd ed.). Springer. ISBN 0-387-95467-8.
- Brekhovskikh, L. M. (1980). Waves in Layered Media (2nd ed.). Academic Press. ISBN 0-12-130560-0.

== Awards and memberships ==
- Walter Munk Award (1996)
- Lenin Prize (1970)
- Rayleigh Gold Medal (UK Institute of Acoustics, 1977)
- Academy of Sciences of the Soviet Union
- National Academy of Sciences
