= Gernsback (crater) =

Lunar crater on far side

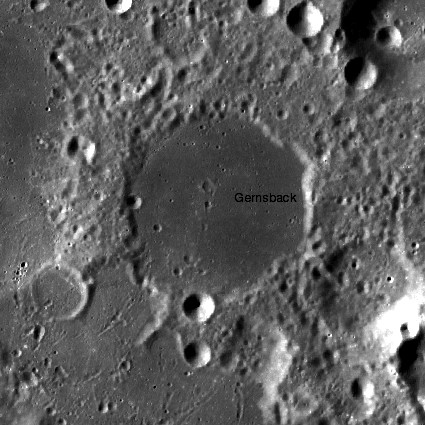
- LRO WAC image
- Coordinates: 36.5°S 99.7°E
- Diameter: 48 km
- Depth: Unknown
- Colongitude: 261° at sunrise
- Eponym: Hugo Gernsback

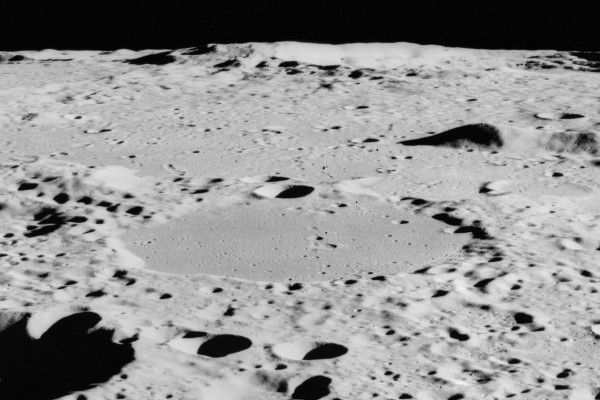
Oblique Apollo 15 image, facing south

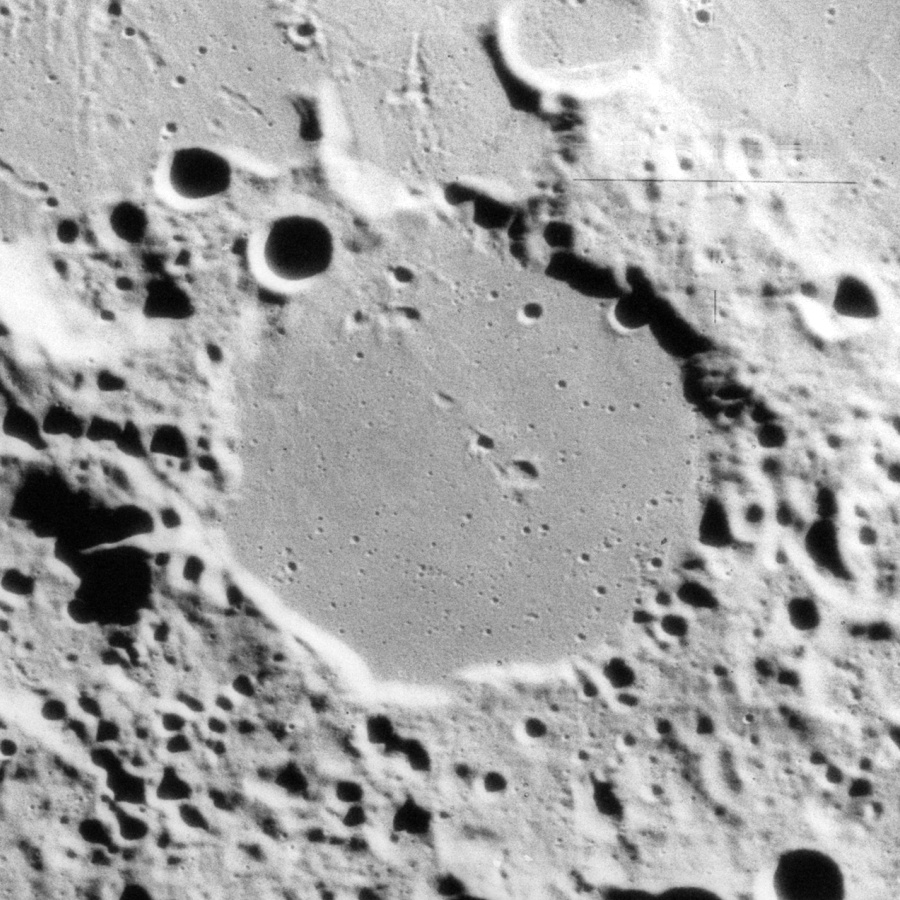
Another view from Apollo 15

Gernsback is a lunar impact crater on the far side of the Moon. It is located in the northeastern part of the uneven Mare Australe, just behind the southeastern limb. During periods of favorable libration this feature can be brought into view of the Earth, but it is seen from the side and not much detail can be observed. It is located about a crater diameter north of the larger crater Lamb, and southwest of Parkhurst.

The interior of this crater has been flooded by lava, leaving a level surface with a low albedo that matches the dark appearance of the lunar mare region to the south and west. The surviving rim is a slender, circular feature with some erosion along the southeastern edge. A small crater lies across the southern rim.

== Satellite craters ==
By convention these features are identified on lunar maps by placing the letter on the side of the crater midpoint that is closest to Gernsback.

Gernsback	Latitude	Longitude	Diameter
H	38.2° S	103.5° E	43 km
J	37.7° S	101.9° E	18 km
