= Cassegrain (crater) =

Lunar impact crater

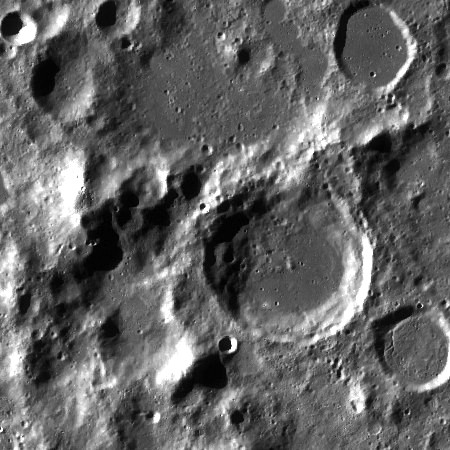
- Cassegrain (lower right of center)
- Coordinates: 54.2°S 113.5°E
- Diameter: 56.66 km (35.21 mi)
- Depth: Unknown
- Colongitude: 248° at sunrise
- Eponym: Laurent Cassegrain

Cassegrain is a lunar impact crater that is located on the far side of the Moon, beyond the southeastern limb. It lies to the southeast of the larger crater Lebedev, and to the northeast of the comparably-sized Priestley.

The interior of this crater has a relatively dark-hued floor, a feature it has in common with other craters to the west and northwest that form part of the Mare Australe. The floor is level and mostly featureless, except for some deposits in the northwest corner. The rim is more heavily worn in the northwest corner than elsewhere, and the remaining inner wall displays a slumped shelf below the rim.

This crater is named after the inventor of the Cassegrain reflector, who was later identified as most likely the French priest Laurent Cassegrain (1629–1693). Its designation was officially adopted by the International Astronomical Union in 1970.

The crater features prominently in the science fiction novel "The Cassandra Project," by Jack McDevitt and Mike Resnick, Ace Books, New York, 2012.

== Satellite craters ==
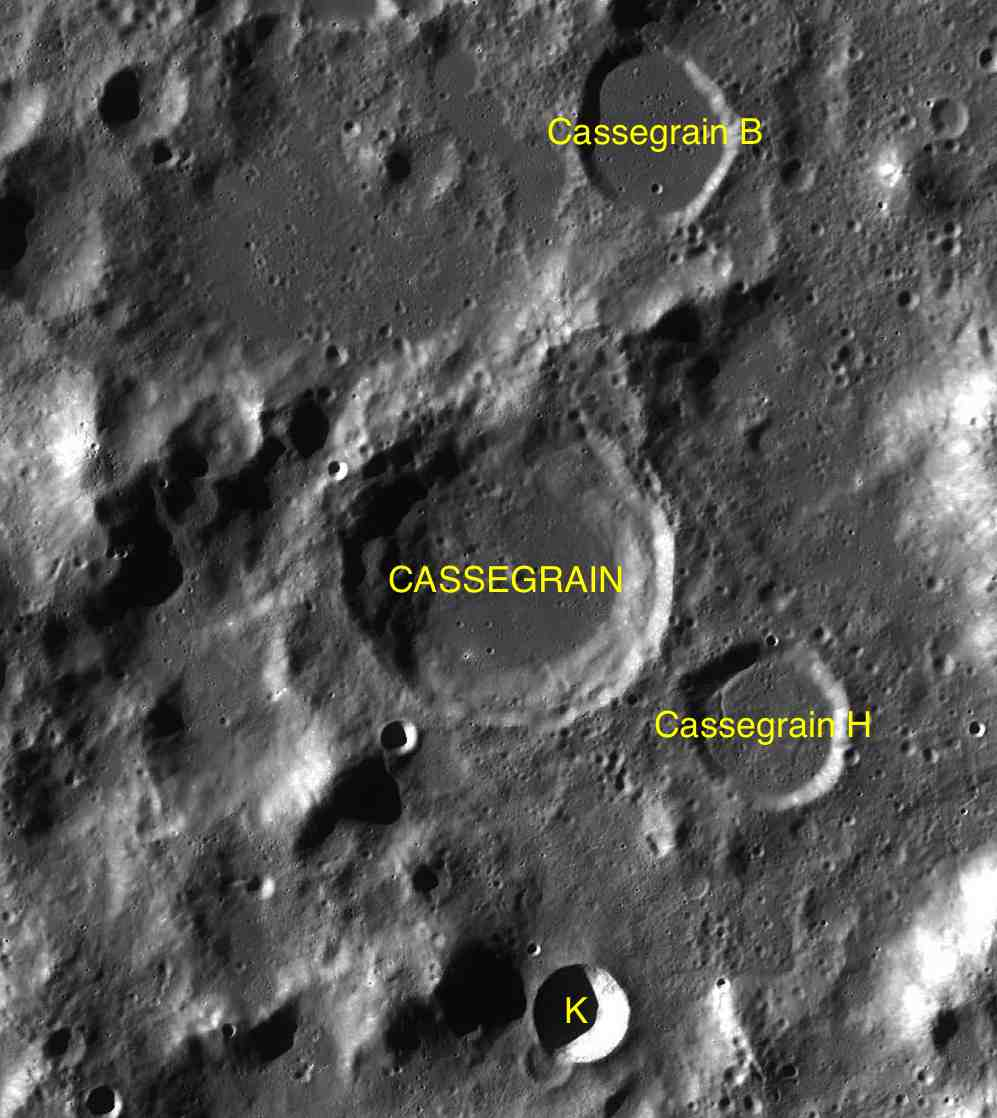
Satellite craters of Cassegrain

By convention these features are identified on lunar maps by placing the letter on the side of the crater midpoint that is closest to Cassegrain.

Cassegrain	Latitude	Longitude	Diameter
B	49.0° S	114.0° E	39 km
H	53.1° S	115.6° E	28 km
K	55.0° S	113.5° E	17 km
