= Barnard (lunar crater) =

Lunar impact crater

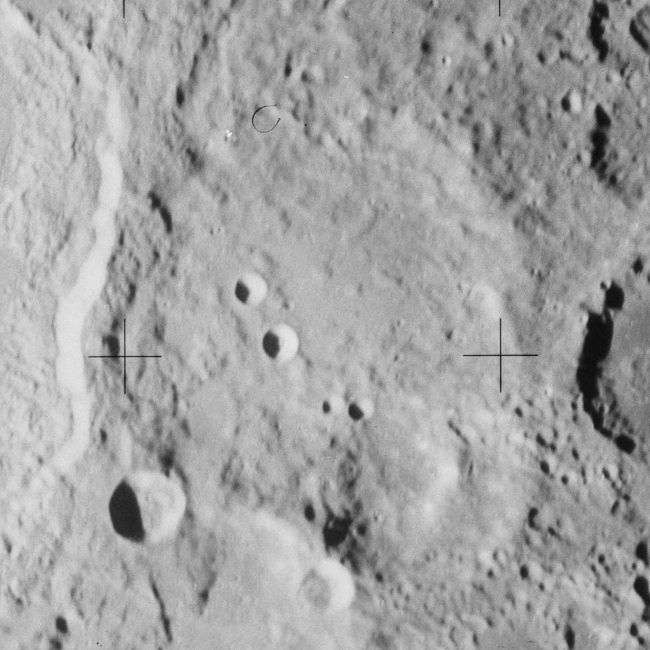
- View from Apollo 15
- Coordinates: 29.5°S 85.6°E
- Diameter: 115.73 km (71.91 mi)
- Depth: Unknown
- Colongitude: 276° at sunrise
- Eponym: Edward E. Barnard

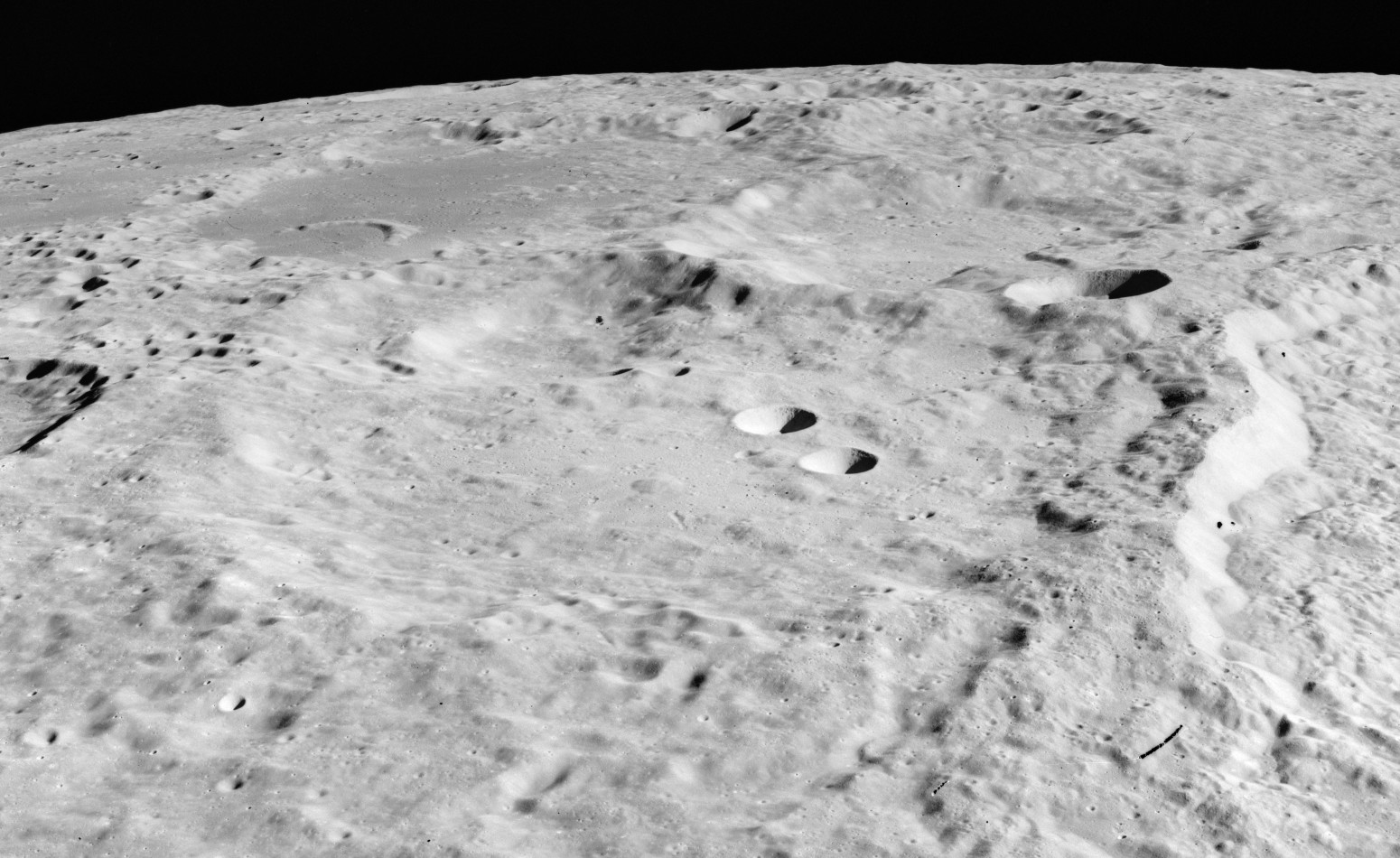
Oblique Apollo 15 image, facing south

Barnard is a lunar impact crater that is located near the eastern limb of the Moon. It is attached to the southeast rim of the large crater Humboldt, and Abel lies directly to the south. To the northeast is the crater Curie, while to the southeast is the Mare Australe.

The formation has been reshaped and distorted by nearby impacts. The interior is irregular, with an intrusion into the southwest rim and rugged formations particularly in the southern half. A matched pair of small craterlets lies near the center of the interior floor. The satellite craters Barnard A and B are attached to the southwest crater rim exterior.

This crater is named after American astronomer Edward E. Barnard (1857–1923), the discoverer of Barnard's Star in 1916. The name was introduced into lunar nomenclature by David W. G. Arthur and Ewen Whitaker with the Rectified Lunar Atlas (1963). Its designation was formally adopted by the International Astronomical Union in 1964.

== Satellite craters ==
By convention these features are identified on lunar maps by placing the letter on the side of the crater midpoint that is closest to Barnard.

Barnard	Latitude	Longitude	Diameter
A	31.8° S	84.5° E	13 km
D	31.4° S	89.3° E	47 km

Barbard D has been flooded by Mare Australe.
