= Anuchin (crater) =

Crater on the Moon

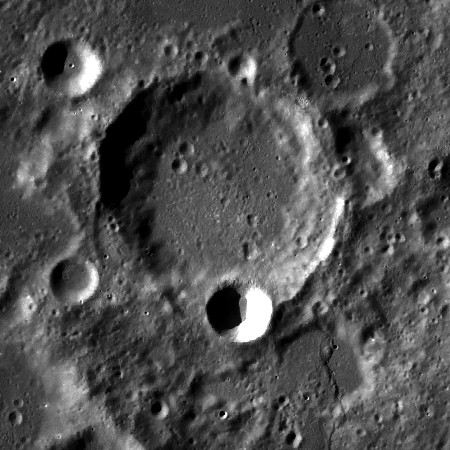
- LRO WAC image
- Coordinates: 49.0°S 101.3°E
- Diameter: 62.14 km (38.61 mi)
- Depth: Unknown
- Colongitude: 260° at sunrise
- Eponym: Dmitry N. Anuchin

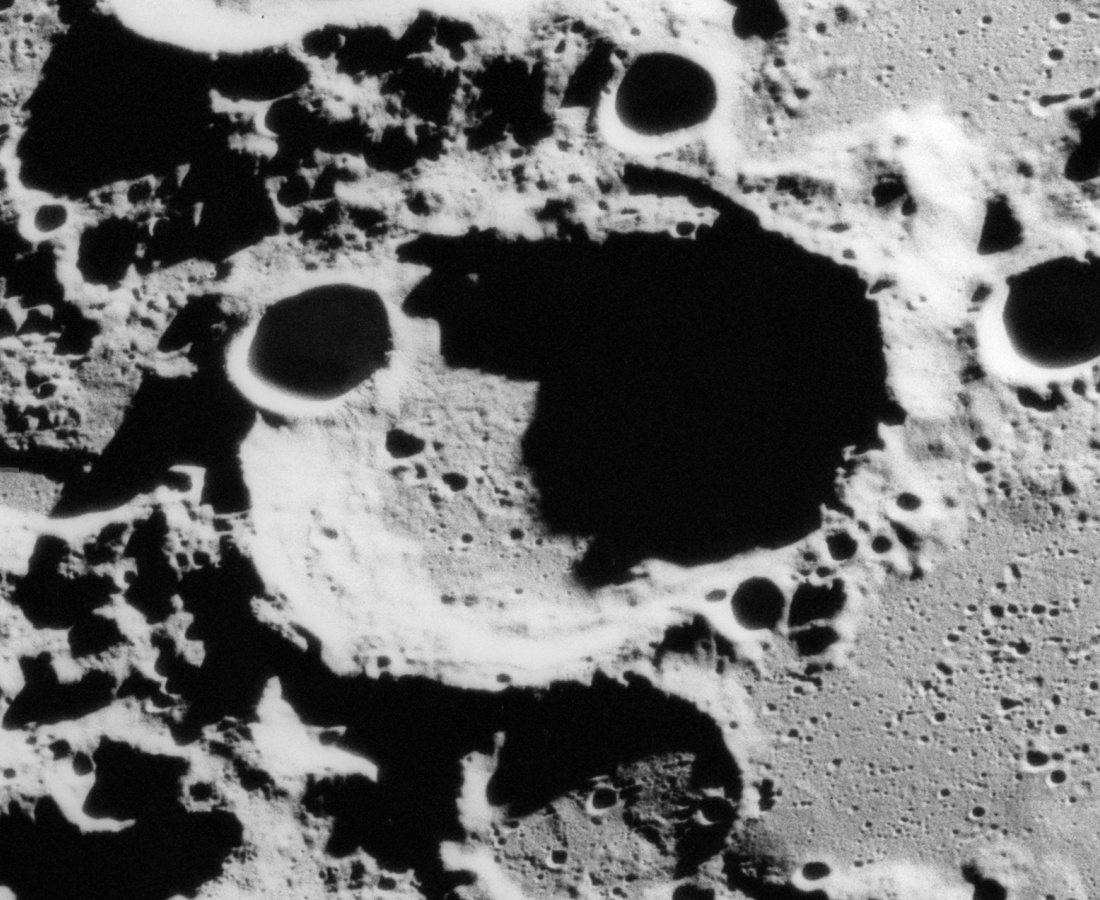
View from Apollo 15

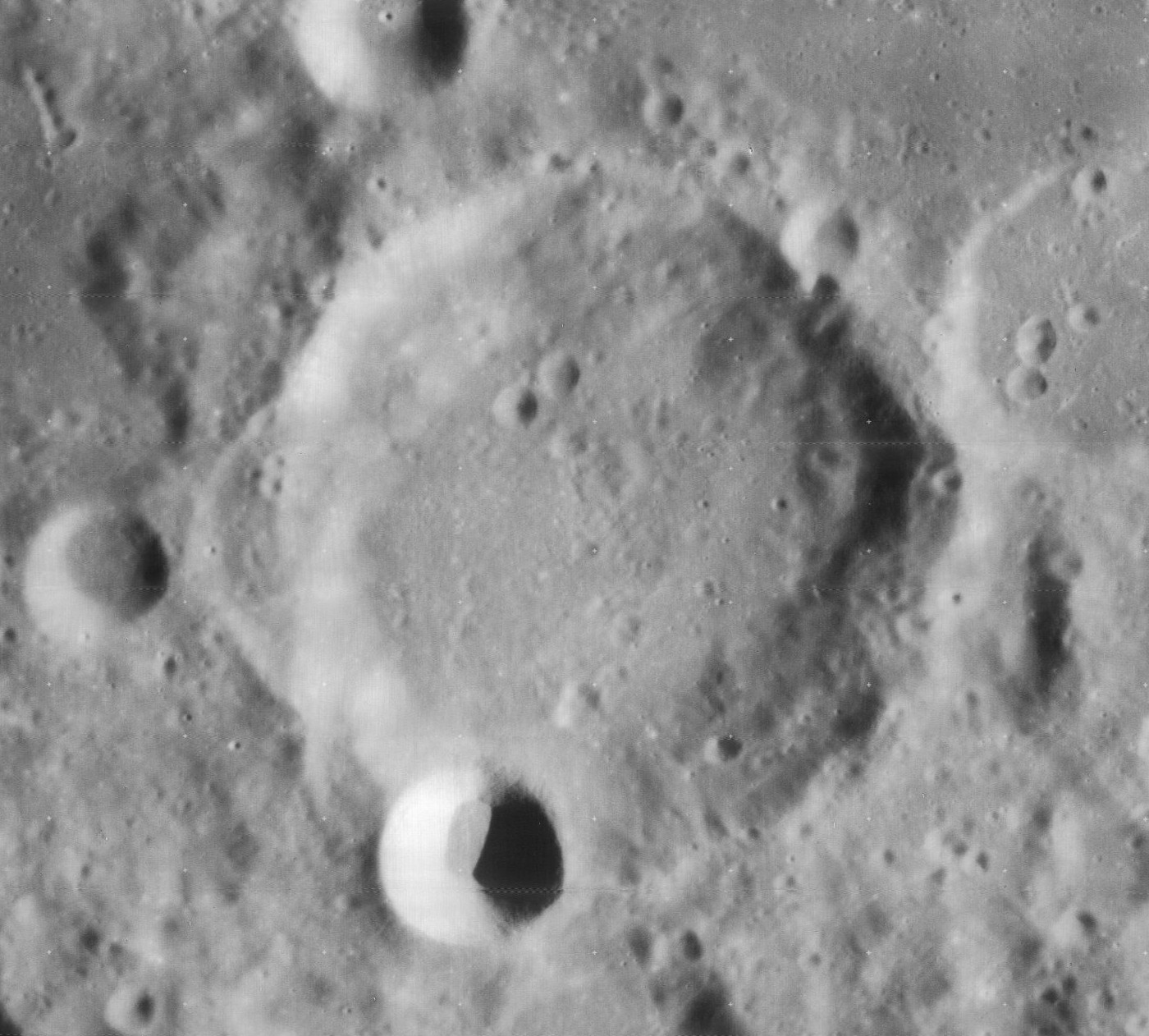
Lunar Orbiter 4 image

Anuchin is a lunar impact crater that lies on the southern hemisphere on the far side of the Moon. It is located to the south of the larger crater Lamb, and to the north-northwest of Kugler.

The rim of Anuchin remains relatively sharply defined, although it has been subject to wear due to subsequent impacts. The satellite crater Anuchin L lies astride the southern rim, but the otherwise the outer wall is not significantly incised. The interior floor is nearly featureless, with no central peak at the midpoint and only a few tiny craterlets. But it does not possess the darker hue of a crater interior that has been resurfaced by lava flows.

This crater is named after Russian geographer and anthropologist Dmitry N. Anuchin (1843-1923). Its designation was formally adopted by the International Astronomical Union in 1979.

== Satellite craters ==
By convention these features are identified on lunar maps by placing the letter on the side of the crater midpoint that is closest to Anuchin.

Anuchin	Latitude	Longitude	Diameter
B	46.7° S	103.3° E	24 km
L	50.2° S	101.7° E	15 km
N	51.6° S	99.6° E	33 km
Q	51.1° S	98.3° E	50 km
V	48.1° S	99.6° E	15 km
