= Kugler (crater) =

Crater on the Moon

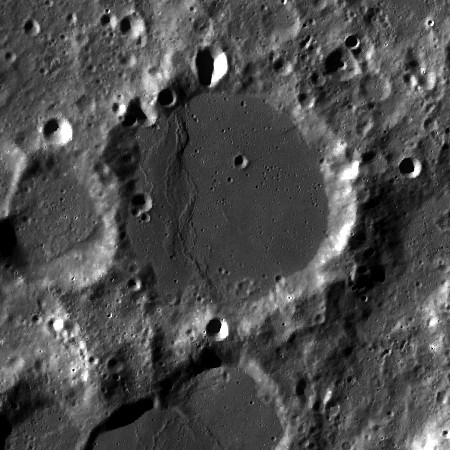
- LRO WAC image
- Coordinates: 53.8°S 103.7°E
- Diameter: 65 km
- Depth: Unknown
- Colongitude: 254° at sunrise
- Eponym: Franz X. Kugler

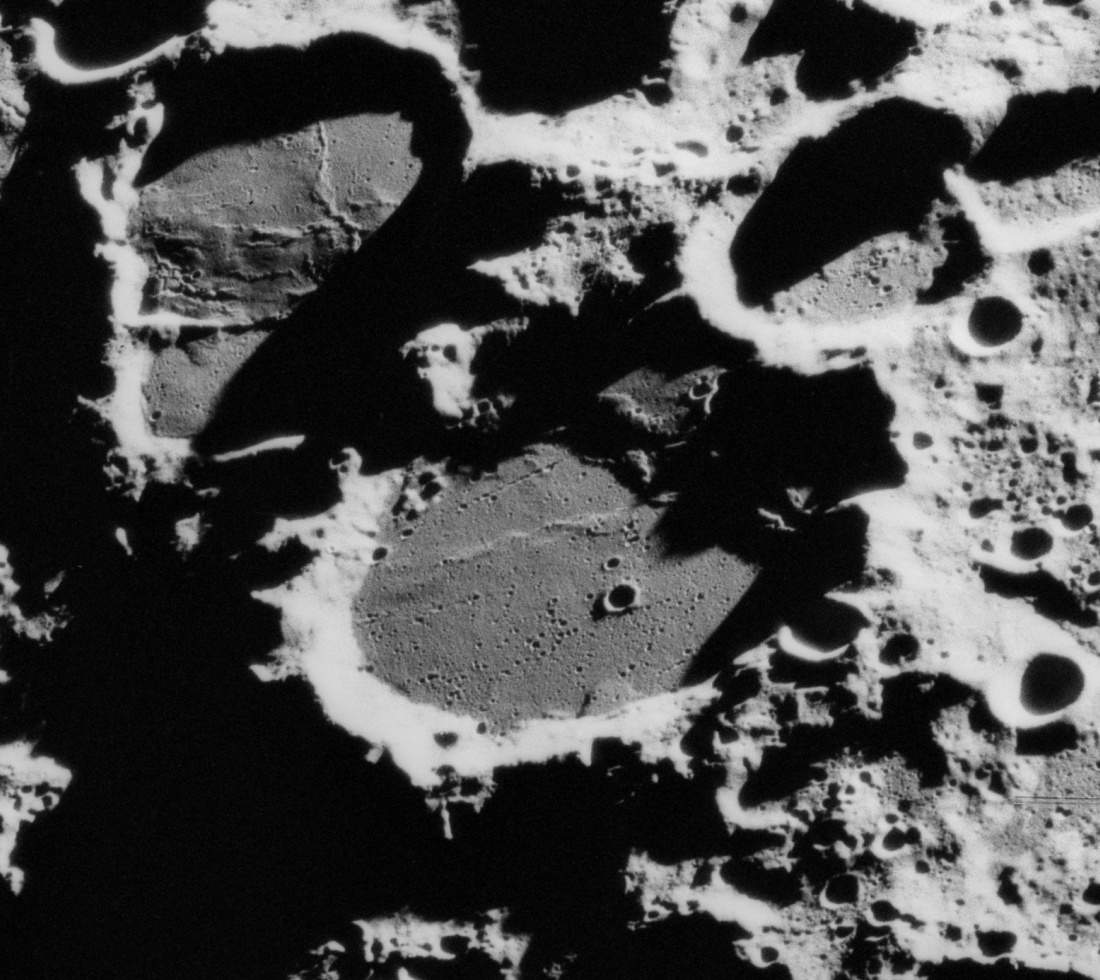
View from Apollo 15, with Kugler U in upper right and Kugler N in upper left.

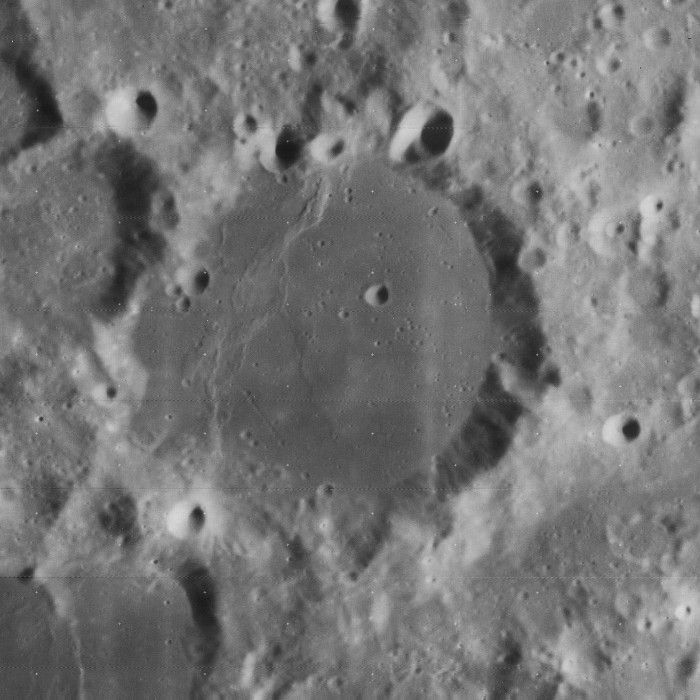
Lunar Orbiter 4 image

Kugler is a lunar impact crater that lies in the southern hemisphere on the far side of the Moon. It is located just past the southeast limb of the Moon's surface, in the proximity of the libration zone that is occasionally brought into sight. The crater lies in the midpoint between the craters Anuchin to the north-northwest and Priestley to the south-southeast.

In the past the floor of this crater has been flooded by basaltic lava, leaving a dark (low albedo) surface that is level and nearly featureless except for a wrinkle ridge that crosses the crater. The surviving rim is low and heavily worn, with a number of old crater indentations along the edge. The crater includes a 14.7-km long lobate scarp. Attached to the western rim is the smaller Kugler U, an old, worn formation. To the south is the double-crater formation Kugler N, which has also been flooded by lava.

== Satellite craters ==
By convention these features are identified on lunar maps by placing the letter on the side of the crater midpoint that is closest to Kugler.

Kugler	Latitude	Longitude	Diameter
N	56.3° S	102.8° E	42 km
R	55.5° S	98.6° E	13 km
U	54.0° S	101.5° E	37 km
