= Harlan James Smith =

American astronomer (1924–1991)

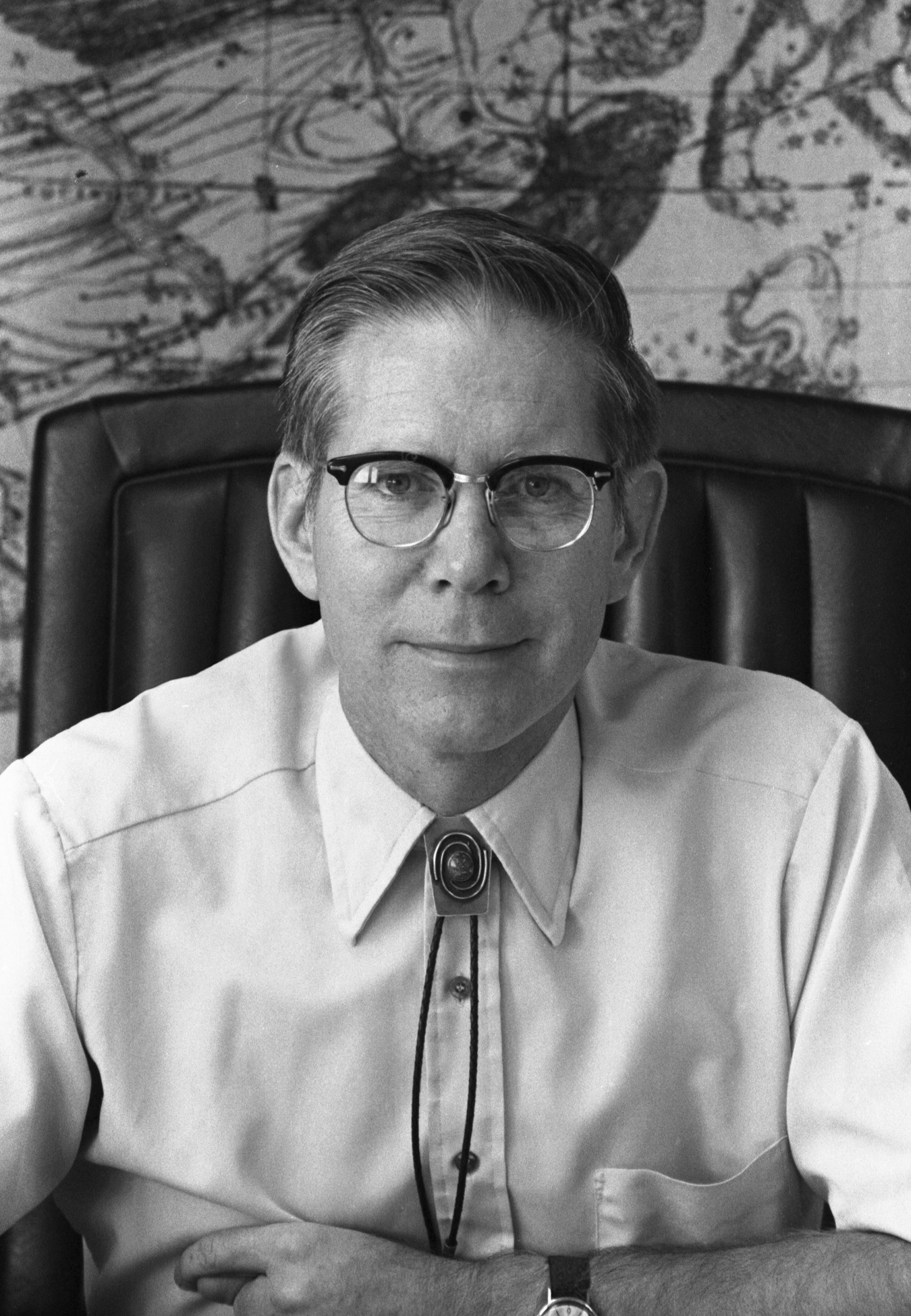
Harlan J. Smith at McDonald Observatory

Harlan James Smith (August 25, 1924 – October 17, 1991) was an American astronomer. He served as director of the University of Texas McDonald Observatory from 1963 to 1989, where, among other accomplishments, he initiated the construction of the Harlan J. Smith Telescope, a 2.7-meter (107-inch) reflector bearing his name .

Smith was born in Wheeling, West Virginia, the son of Paul and Anna McGregor Smith. While attending Wheeling High School he was named first runner up in the "Westinghouse National Science Talent Search". From 1943 until the end of World War II he served in the U.S. Army Air Corps, performing weather observation. Following the war he attended Harvard University, earning a B.A. in 1949. In 1950 he married Joan Greene, and by 1951 had earned his M.S. degree from Harvard. He began teaching at the astronomy department at Yale University in 1953, but still completed his Ph.D. from Harvard by 1955. During his career he studied variable stars, the radio emission from planets, as well as photometry and astronomical instruments. With Dorrit Hoffleit, he was the first to observe the optical variability of quasars, and discovered a class of variable stars known as Delta Scuti variables.

He came to McDonald Observatory as director in 1963, when he was also named chair of the University of Texas Astronomy Department in Austin, Texas. McDonald Observatory itself is located 440 miles west of Austin, in the Davis Mountains of West Texas. As head of the observatory, Smith's first major act was to obtain the funds needed to build the 2.7m telescope. Toward that end, he persuaded NASA the telescope was needed in support of space missions to the planets. The telescope brought new life to the observatory and helped recruit young faculty members, establishing McDonald as key player in the exploration of the Solar System. In 1991, Smith received the NASA Distinguished Public Service Medal "for a lifetime of service to the astronomy and space communities."

From 1966 until 1970, Smith was a member of the Committee on the Large Space Telescope, an ad hoc group formed by the National Academy of Sciences, the work of which resulted in the Hubble Space Telescope. He also was the chairperson of the NASA Space Science Board from 1977 until 1980, and there helped propose NASA's Great Observatories program. Smith was an enthusiastic proponent of educating the public on astronomy, and provided the support needed to develop the syndicated radio program StarDate. He also developed "The Story of the Universe", a series of educational films. He was also a proponent of international cooperation, particularly with China which he visited several times. He served as co-editor of the Astronomical Journal as well as acting secretary for the American Astronomical Society.

Smith retired as McDonald Observatory's director in 1989. Afterwards, he served as the Edward Randall Jr., MD, Centennial Professor of Astronomy at the University of Texas at Austin.

Smith died in 1991 due to complications related to cancer. He was survived by his wife and four children, along with their grandchildren.

== Awards and honors ==
- 1991 NASA Distinguished Public Service Medal
- A professorship in astronomy at the University of Texas is named after him.
- Asteroid 3842 Harlansmith is named after him.
- The crater Harlan on the Moon is named after him.
