= Parkhurst (crater) =

Crater on the Moon

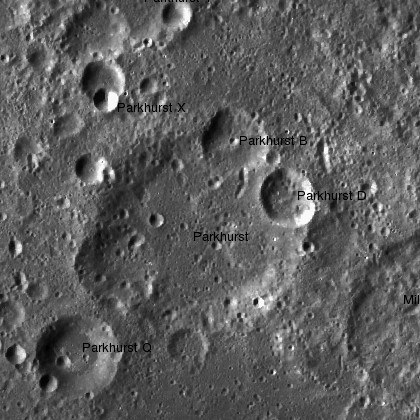
- LRO WAC image
- Coordinates: 33.4°S 103.6°E
- Diameter: 96 km
- Depth: Unknown
- Colongitude: 258° at sunrise
- Eponym: John A. Parkhurst

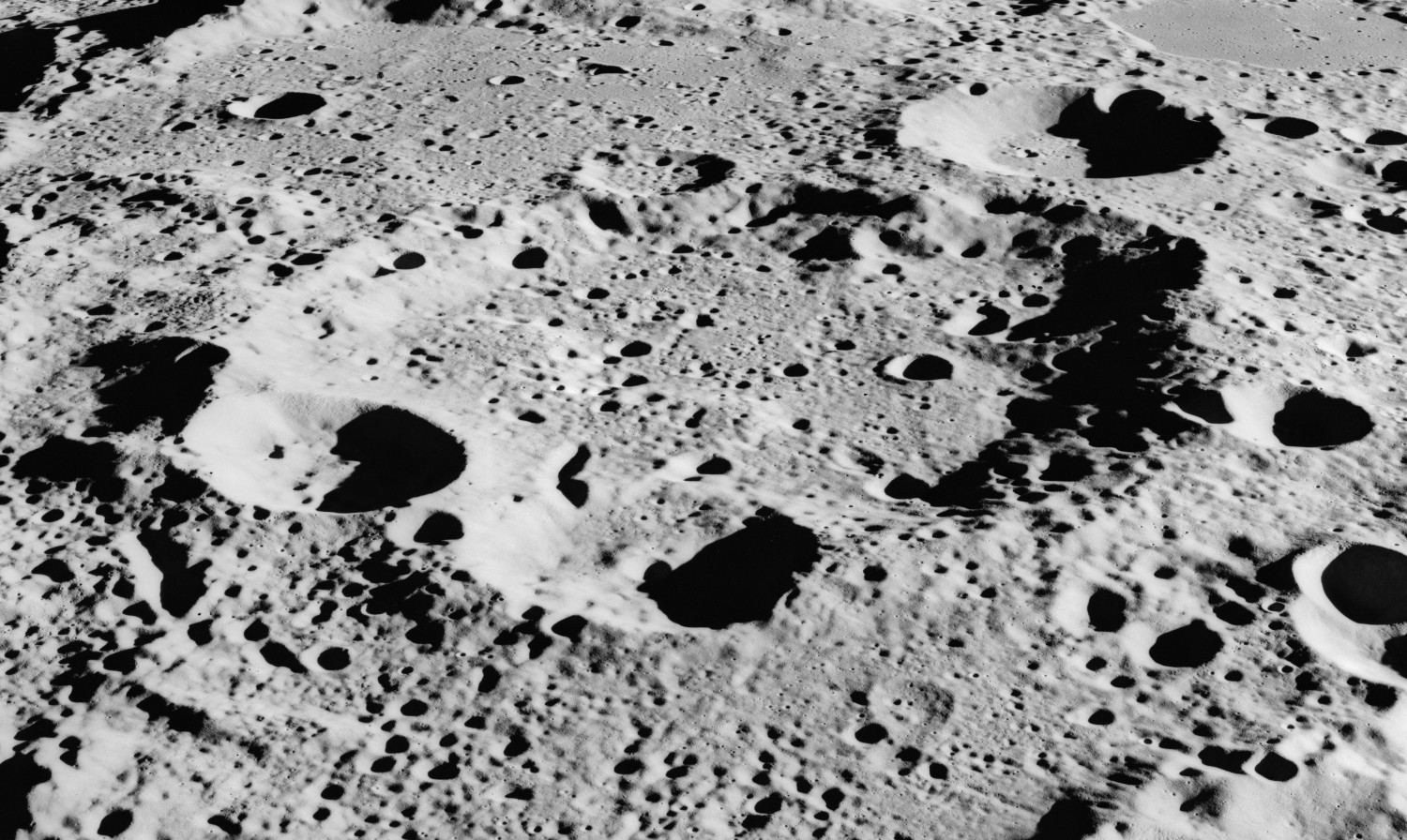
Oblique Apollo 15 image, facing south

Parkhurst is a heavily degraded lunar impact crater to the northeast of the Mare Australe on the far side of the Moon. To the north-northeast of Parkhurst is the crater Scaliger and to the southwest lies the dark-floored Gernsback. The small lunar mare named Lacus Solitudinis lies due north of Parkhurst.

Little remains of this crater formation other than the uneven outline of the outer rim. Several satellite craters lie along the rim edge, with Parkhust D along the northeast, B to the north, and X along the northwest. The satellite crater Parkhurst Q pushes into the southwestern rim, distorting the edge shape. The interior floor of Parkhurst is pock-marked by small craterlets.

Parkhurst crater was name after John Adelbert Parkhurst, an American astronomer.

== Satellite craters ==
By convention these features are identified on lunar maps by placing the letter on the side of the crater midpoint that is closest to Parkhurst.

Parkhurst	Latitude	Longitude	Diameter
B	32.0° S	104.4° E	30 km
D	32.8° S	105.4° E	27 km
K	36.3° S	105.2° E	11 km
Q	35.0° S	101.6° E	37 km
X	31.5° S	102.3° E	12 km
Y	29.9° S	102.8° E	49 km
