= Dmitry Anuchin =

Russian anthropologist, ethnographist, archaeologist, geographer (1843–1923)

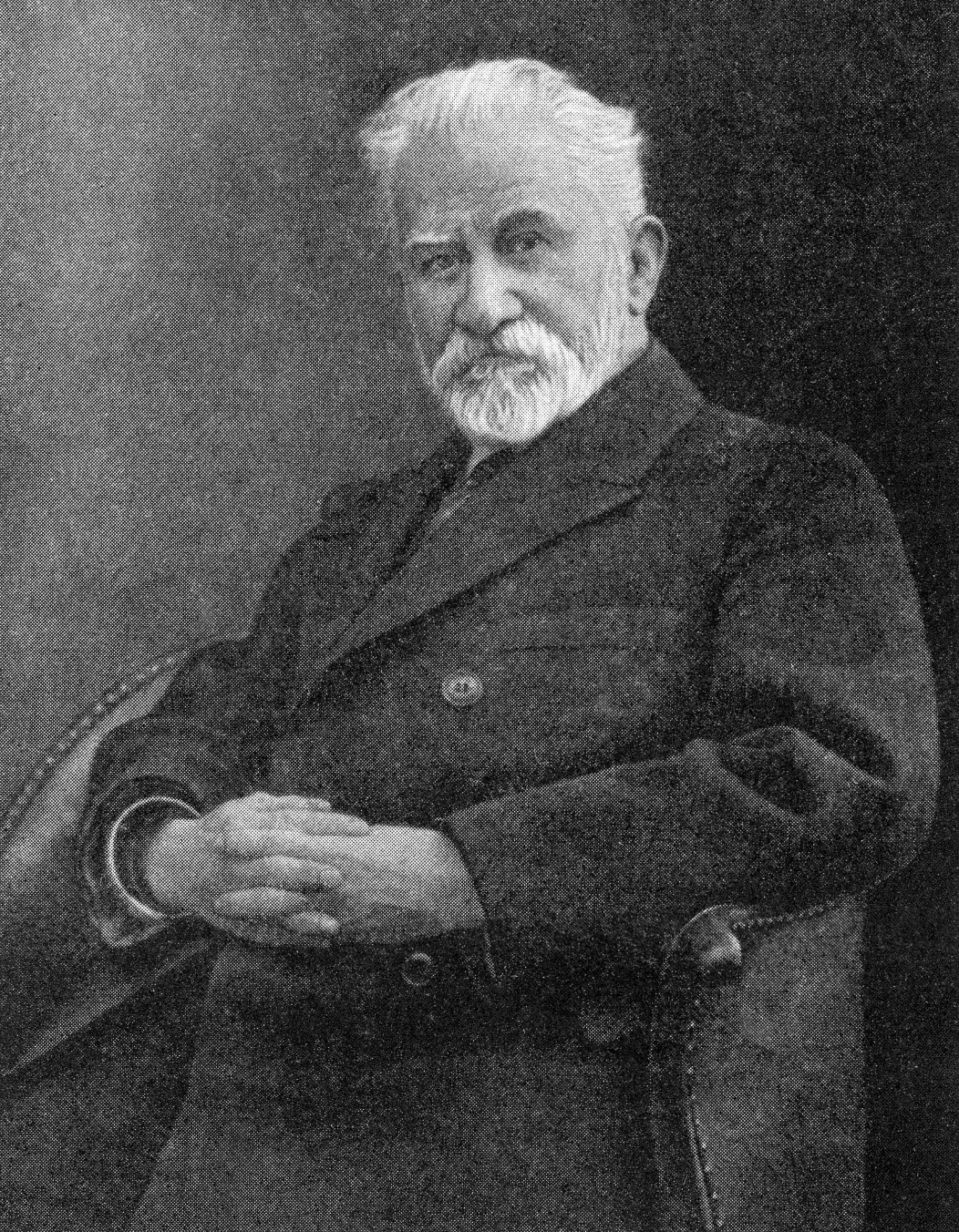
- Dmitry Nikolayevich Anuchin
- Born: 27 August 1843; Saint Petersburg, Russian Empire
- Died: 4 June 1923 (aged 79); Moscow, Russian SFSR, Soviet Union
- Education: Imperial Moscow University (1867)
- Scientific career
- Fields: Ethnography, Ethnology

Dmitry Nikolayevich Anuchin (Russian: Дми́трий Никола́евич Ану́чин; 27 August 1843 – 4 June 1923) was a Russian anthropologist, ethnographist, archaeologist, and geographer. He was a member of the Russian Geographical Society and convened the ethnographic sub-section of the 12th Congress of Russian Natural Scientists and Physicians(XII съезда русских естествоиспытателей и врачей) held in Moscow in 1909. Here he pushed for the professionalisation of ethnography as compared to missionaries and amateurs. However he opposed Lev Sternberg's call for the establishment of an imperial bureau of ethnography, fearing that the discipline would become too tied up with the Tsarist bureaucracy.

However, in 1915 he did become involved with the Commission for the Study of the Natural Productive Forces (KEPS) which assisted in the wartime mobilisation of resources in the Russian Empire. He argued for a second government-sponsored commission to study the population along the lines of the American Bureau of Ethnology. The Russian Academy of Sciences dismissed his proposal as unrealisable, but did establish within KEPS a Committee for the Description of Russia by Region. This turn around has been explained as arising from the situation when there was little scope for ethnographers to do independent research as many had been drafted into military hospitals and similar institutions to help with the war effort.

The crater Anuchin on the Moon, Anuchin Institute of Anthropology at Moscow State University, a glacier in Novaya Zemlya, one of the Kuril Islands and a mountain in Ural are named after him.

== Honours and awards ==
- Order of St. Vladimir (Grade 3 and 4)
- Order of St. Anna (Grade 2)
- Legion of Honour (France)
