= Pyotr Lebedev =

Russian physicist (1866–1912)

Pyotr Nikolaevich Lebedev
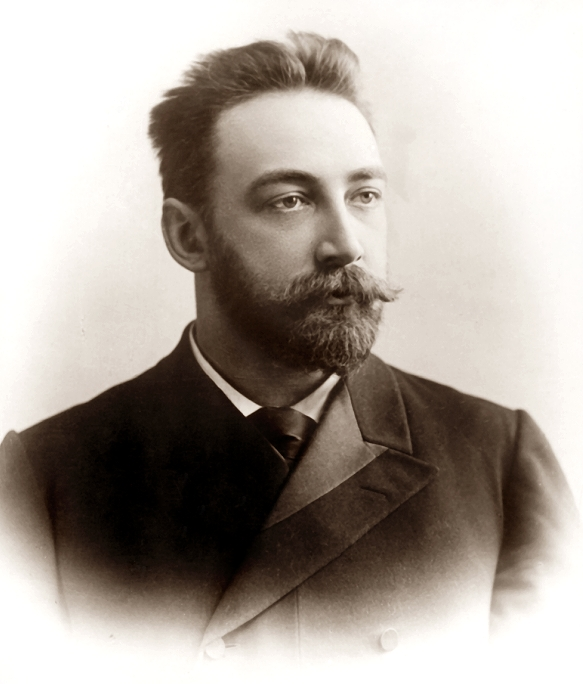
- Born: 24 February 1866; Moscow, Russian Empire
- Died: 1 March 1912 (aged 46); Moscow, Russian Empire
- Education: University of Strasbourg
- Known for: Demonstration of radiation pressure
- Scientific career
- Fields: Physicist
- Workplaces: Moscow State University
- Doctoral advisor: August Kundt
- Doctoral students: P. P. Lazarev

Pyotr Nikolaevich Lebedev (Russian: Пётр Никола́евич Ле́бедев; 24 February 1866 – 1 March 1912) was a Russian physicist. His name was also transliterated as Peter Lebedew and Peter Lebedev. Lebedev was the creator of the first scientific school in Russia.

== Career ==
Lebedev made his doctoral degree in Strasbourg under the supervision of August Kundt in 1887–1891. In 1891, he started working in Moscow State University in the group of Alexander Stoletov. There he made his famous experimental studies of electromagnetic waves.

Along with Indian physicist Jagadish Chandra Bose he was one of the first to investigate millimeter waves, generating 50 GHz (6 mm) microwaves beginning in 1895 with a spark oscillator made of two platinum cylinders 1.5 cm long and 0.5 diameter immersed in kerosene at the focus of a parabolic reflector, and detecting the waves with an iron-constantan thermocouple detector.

With this apparatus, he extended the work of Heinrich Hertz to higher frequencies, duplicating classical optics experiments using quasioptical components such as lenses, prisms and quarter-wave plates made of sulfur and wire diffraction gratings to demonstrate refraction, diffraction, double refraction, birefringence and polarization of millimeter waves.

He was the first to measure the pressure of light on a solid body in 1899. The discovery was announced at the International Congress of Physics during Paris Exposition Universelle, and became the first quantitative confirmation of Maxwell's theory of electromagnetism.

An English translation of the paper as well as a historical review is in.

In 1909, he reported that the pressure of light on gas is in agreement with predictions based on Maxwell's theory.

== Later life ==
In 1901, he became a professor at Moscow State University, however, he quit the University in 1911, protesting against the politics of the Ministry of Education. In the same year, he received an invitation to become a professor in Stockholm, which he rejected. He died the next year of a hereditary heart condition.

== Legacy ==
The Lebedev Physical Institute in Moscow and the lunar crater Lebedev are named after him.

== See also ==
- Pyotr Lebedev (research vessel)
