= Polygon experiment =

Experiment in oceanography conducted in middle of the Atlantic Ocean during the 1970s

The POLYGON experiment was a pioneer experiment in oceanography conducted in the middle of the Atlantic Ocean during the 1970s. The experiment, led by Leonid Brekhovskikh, was the first to establish the existence of so-called mesoscale eddies, eddies at the 100 km (60 mi) and 100-day scale, which triggered the "mesoscale revolution". The existence of mesoscale eddies was predicted by Henry Stommel in the 1960s, but there was no way to observe them with traditional sampling methods.

== Setup and results ==
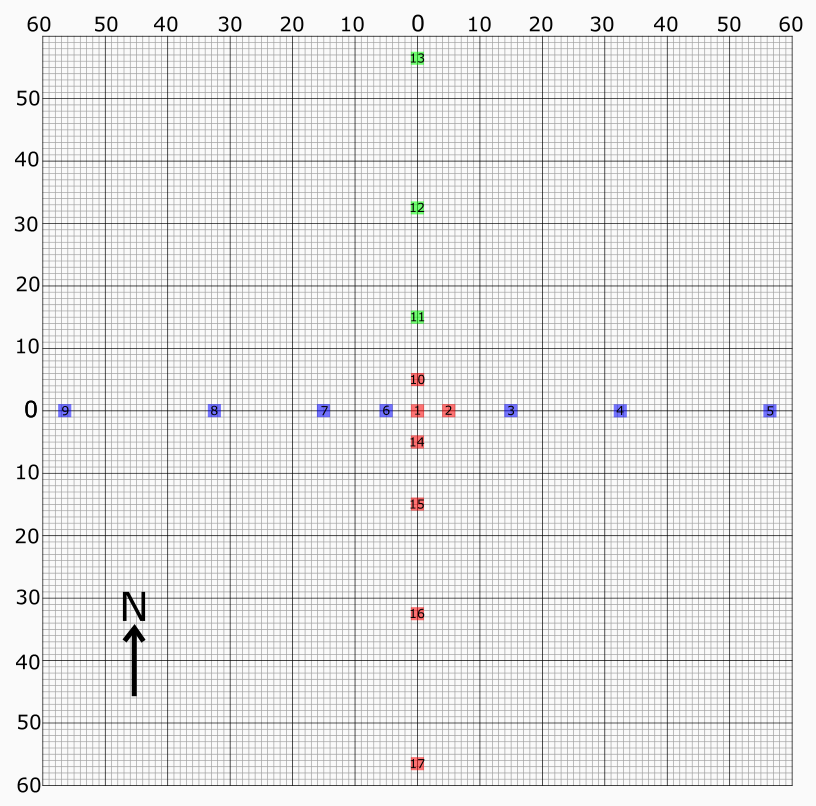
POLYGON experiment current meters. Those managed by Akademik Kurchatov are in blue, managed by Dmitri Mendeleev are in red and managed by Andrei Vil'kitskii are in green. Buoy no. 1 at the centre of the axes is located at coordinates 16.5° N, 33.5° W. Both axes are in nautical miles.

POLYGON was led by Leonid Brekhovskikh, from the Andreev Acoustics Institute, involving six research vessels and an extensive network of current meters. The flow meters were disposed in a cross, spanning a region of 113 by 113 nautical miles dubbed the "polygon". The experiment recorded temperature and flow, replacing the meters every 25 days, while taking care that the replacements would not create gaps in the data. The research vessels involved were the Akademik Kurchatov, the Dmitri Mendeleev, the Andrei Vil'kitskii, the Akademik Vernadskii, the Sergei Vavilov and the Pyotr Lebedev.

Of the results, Brekhovskikh wrote in original breakthrough article "Even with somewhat less sophisticated gear than was desirable, the results... exceeded all expectations in terms of ... the significance of the scientific results obtained. Undoubtedly the experience... will be very useful in the preparation for the forthcoming international campaign MODE... It looks as though some largescale eddy or wave disturbances were travelling across the POLYGON site from east to west. Their scales were close to those of the planetary baroclinic Rossby waves..."

== Follow up ==
POLYGON was followed by the MODE experiment (Mid Ocean Dynamics Experiment) led by Henry Stommel, and the POLYMODE experiment by Andrei Monin. Walter Munk commented that the POLYGON experiment "ignited the mesoscale revolution [and that] MODE defined the new order" and that "oceanography has never been the same" since.
