= Priestley (lunar crater) =

Crater on the Moon

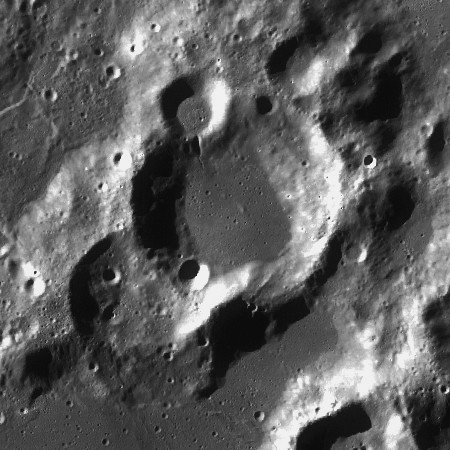
- LRO WAC image
- Coordinates: 57.3°S 108.4°E
- Diameter: 52 km (32 mi)
- Colongitude: 253° at sunrise
- Eponym: Joseph Priestley

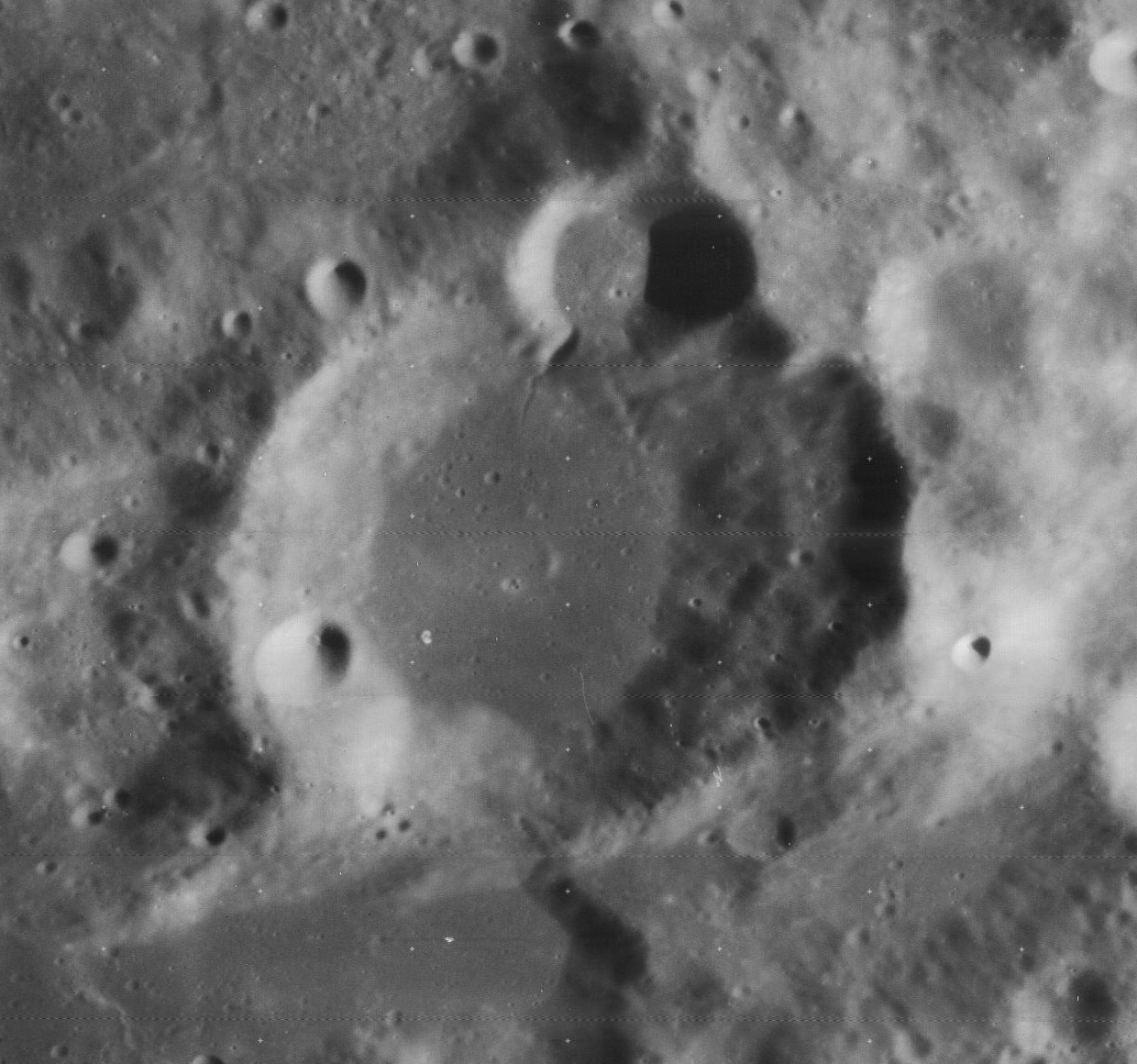
Lunar Orbiter 4 image

Priestley is a lunar impact crater that is located on the far side of the Moon from the Earth, in the low southern latitudes. It lies to the southeast of the flooded crater Kugler.

This is a worn crater with a rim and inner wall that have been softened and have lost the sharp features of a young crater. The satellite crater Priestley X lies across the northern rim and part of the inner wall. There is a small, relatively fresh crater on the inner wall to the south-southwest. An old crater-like feature is attached to the southwestern outer rim, and shares part of its rim with Priestley. The inner wall is narrower in the southeast than elsewhere. Within the interior is a level, featureless floor.

A depression in the surface to the south of Priestley has been flooded with lava, leaving a level plain with a low albedo. This flooded area stretches to the west and then to the northwest, and is about four times as long as Priestley is wide.

== Satellite craters ==
By convention, these features are identified on lunar maps by placing the letter on the side of the crater midpoint that is closest to Priestley.

Priestley	Latitude	Longitude	Diameter
K	59.0° S	110.5° E	35 km
X	56.5° S	107.8° E	14 km
