= Oken (crater) =

Crater on the Moon

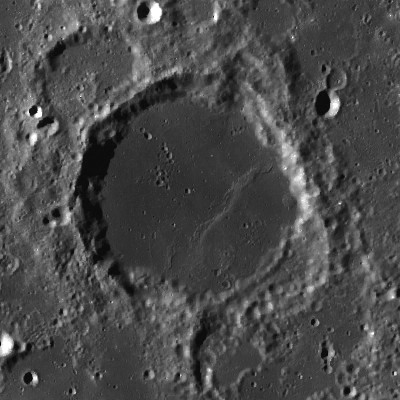
- LRO image
- Coordinates: 43.7°S 75.9°E
- Diameter: 72 km
- Depth: Unknown
- Colongitude: 286° at sunrise
- Eponym: Lorenz Oken

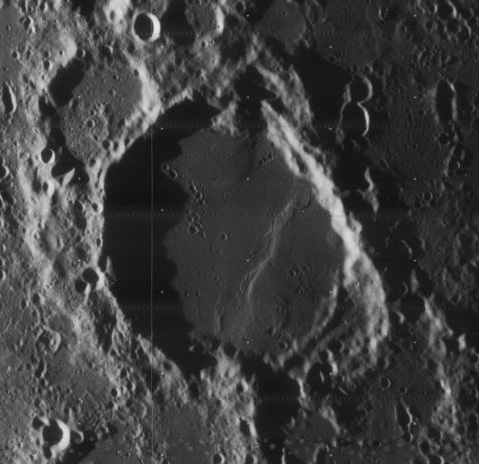
Lunar Orbiter 4 image

Oken is a lunar impact crater near the southeastern limb of the Moon. It is normally visible from the Earth, but is foreshortened and within the region of the surface that is subject to libration. To the south and east of this feature is the broad, uneven Mare Australe, which extends to the far side of the Moon.

The interior of this crater has become flooded by basaltic lava, producing a nearly level, featureless surface with a low albedo. A number of tiny craterlets mark this surface, particularly in the northwest. The surrounding mountain ring has been eroded by impacts, and is somewhat distorted from a true circular shape. There is a wide bulge in the rim toward the southeast, where the surface is lower and more rugged. Slight bulges also exist to the southwest and northwest. The rim is marked by a number of tiny impacts along the edge, particularly to the southwest.

== Satellite craters ==
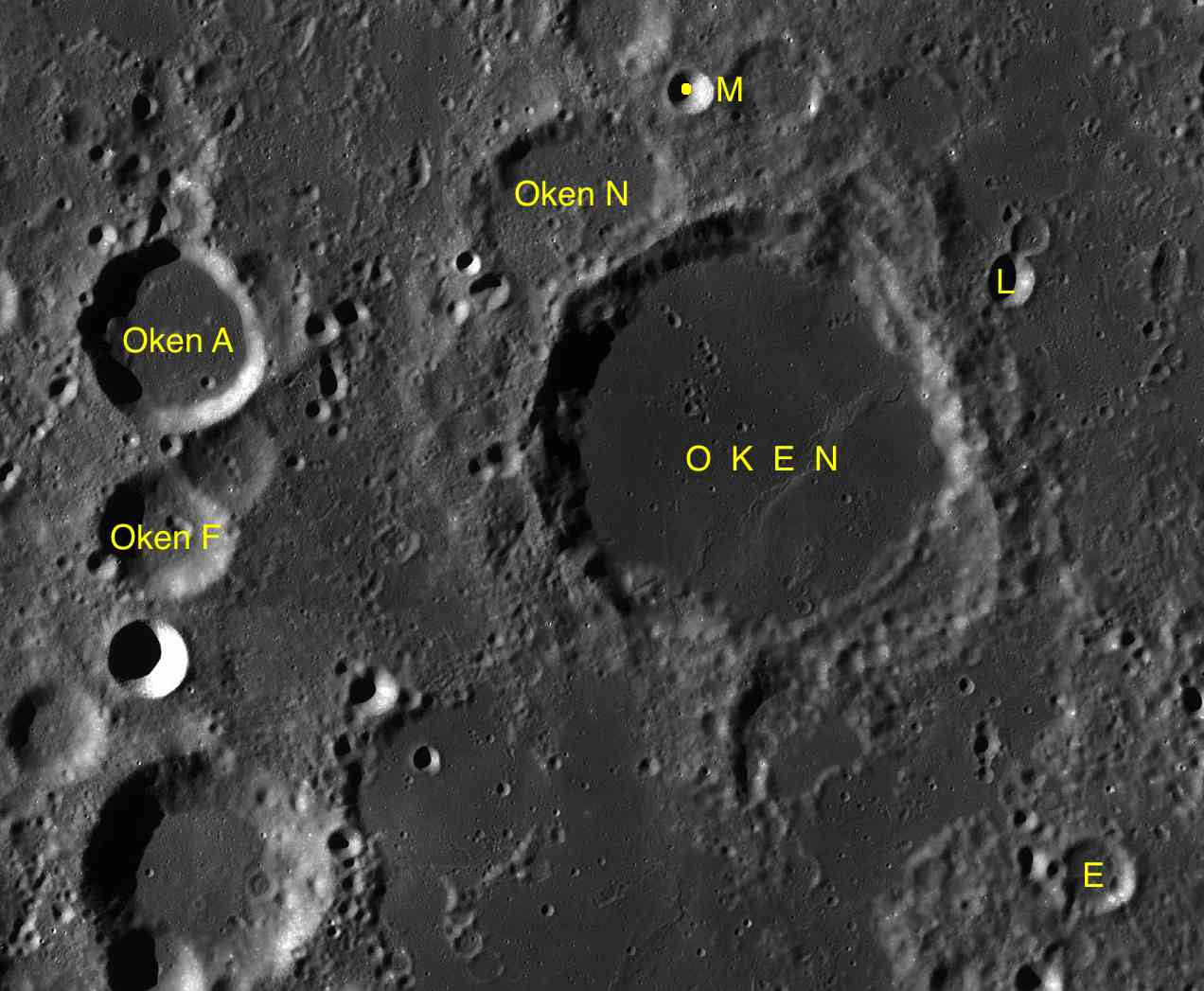
Satellite craters

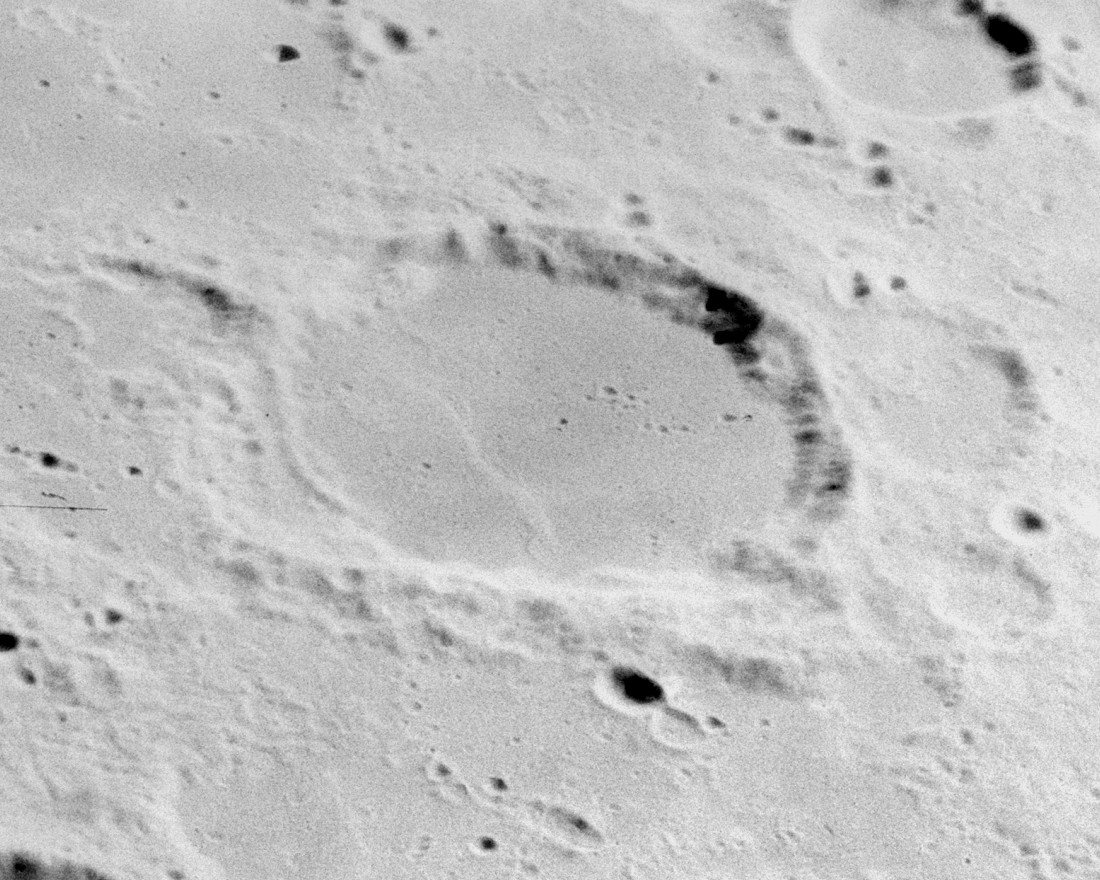
Oblique Apollo 15 image

By convention these features are identified on lunar maps by placing the letter on the side of the crater midpoint that is closest to Oken.

Oken	Latitude	Longitude	Diameter
A	43.2° S	71.3° E	36 km
E	46.1° S	78.9° E	12 km
F	44.4° S	71.5° E	21 km
L	43.1° S	78.2° E	10 km
M	41.8° S	75.4° E	7 km
N	42.4° S	74.5° E	40 km
