= Pyotr Lebedev (research vessel) =

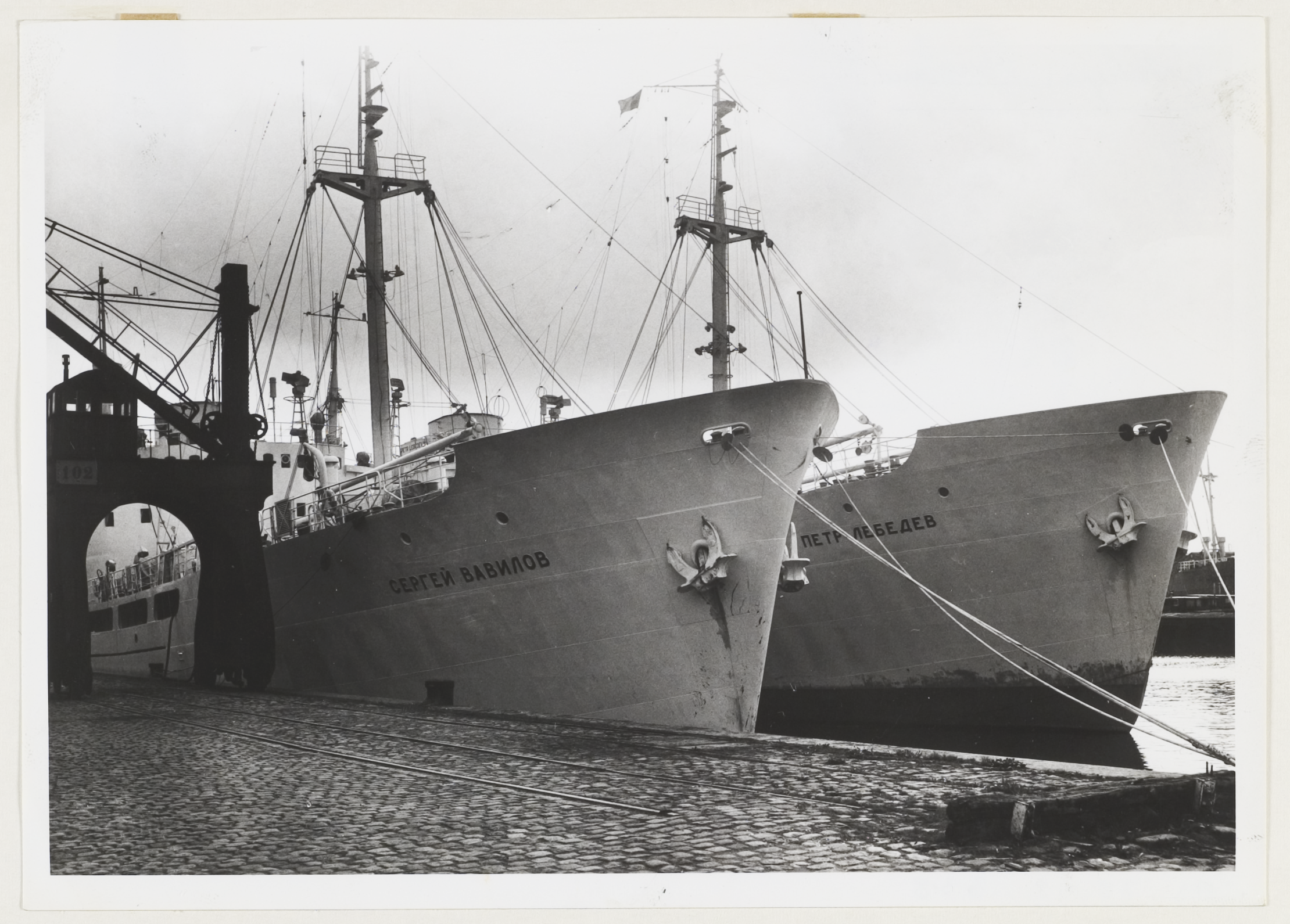
- Pyotr Lebedev alongside sister ship Sergey Vavilov

History
- Name: Chapayev
- Builder: Wärtsilä Crichton-Vulcan, Turku, Finland
- Yard number: 1002
- Laid down: 16 April 1956
- Acquired: 3 April 1957

Soviet Union
- Name: Pyotr Lebedev
- Namesake: Pyotr Lebedev
- In service: 1966
- Out of service: 1977

Saint Vincent and the Grenadines
- Name: Pyotr Lebedev
- Identification: IMO number: 5276159
- Status: in active service

General characteristics
- Type: Research vessel/survey vessel
- Tonnage: 3,642 GT; 1,675 DWT

Pyotr Lebedev is a research vessel, built at Wärtsilä Crichton-Vulcan in Turku, Finland, originally as a merchant vessel Chapayev in 1957. She was subsequently acquired for the Soviet Union and refitted as a research ship. The vessel was owned and operated by the Andreev Acoustics Institute, and was used to make hydrophysical observations of the Atlantic Ocean such as during the Polygon experiment. Pyotr Lebedev possessed five on-board laboratories used to study hydroacoustics, hydrology, hydrobiology, hydrochemistry, and electronics. The ship was active as a research vessel from 1967 until 1977. She is current registered in Saint Vincent and the Grenadines.
