= John Adelbert Parkhurst =

American astronomer

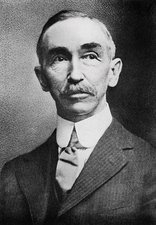
John Adelbert Parkhurst

John Adelbert Parkhurst (September 24, 1861 – March 1, 1925) was an American astronomer.

He was born in Dixon, Illinois, and attended the public schools in Marengo, IL and Wheaton College. He then attended Rose Polytechnic Institute in Terre Haute, Indiana, earning a B.Sc. in 1886. For the following two years he taught mathematics at the same school. He was the son of Sanford Britton Parkhurst and Jane Clarissa Hubbard. Source: George Parkhurst Increasings by Peter G. Parkhurst, p. 402. In 1888 he married Anna Greenleaf.

He returned to Marengo, Illinois where he kept a small, private observatory that he used primarily for variable star observation. Yerkes Observatory was built nearby in 1897, and in 1898 he joined the staff as a volunteer research assistant. By 1900 he was appointed as an assistant. He remained on the staff for 25 years, later becoming an associate professor at the University of Chicago, specializing in practical astronomy.

His most important work was in the specialty of photometry. He also participated in three eclipse expeditions, but only enjoyed clear seeing conditions on the last (1925). During his career he published about 100 papers on astronomy, both before and during his time at Yerkes. In 1905 he was elected a fellow of the Royal Astronomical Society. On February 27, 1925, he suffered a cerebral hemorrhage and died a few days later at his home in Williams Bay. He was survived by his wife, Anna.

The crater Parkhurst on the Moon is named after him. Parkhurst Place in Williams Bay is also named for him. This street leads into the east side of Yerkes Observatory and wraps around into the South Lawn. Parkhurst Place is where many noteworthy astronomers and astronomy educators of the 20th Century lived including Subramanyan Chandrasekhar, William Wilson Morgan, Otto Struve, Franklin E. Roach, and George Ellery Hale.
