= Laurent Cassegrain =

Catholic priest and notable probable inventor of the Cassegrain reflector

- Born: 1629; Chartres
- Died: 1693 (aged 63–64); Chaudon
- Citizenship: French
- Known for: Cassegrain reflector
- Scientific career
- Fields: Optics: Telescope
- Institutions: Collège de Chartres

Laurent Cassegrain (French: [loʁɑ̃ kasgʁɛ̃]; c. 1629 – 1 September 1693) was a Catholic priest who is notable as the probable inventor of the Cassegrain reflector, a folded two-mirror reflecting telescope design.

== Biography ==
Laurent Cassegrain was born in the region of Chartres around 1629 and was the son of Mathurin Cassegrain and Jehanne Marquet. It is unknown what his education was but he was a priest and professor by 1654. He may have been interested in acoustics, optics and mechanics. At the time of his death he was working as a teacher giving science classes at the Collège de Chartres, a French lycée, i.e., a high-school like institution. He died at Chaudon (Eure-et-Loir) on 1 September 1693.

== Connection with the Cassegrain reflector ==
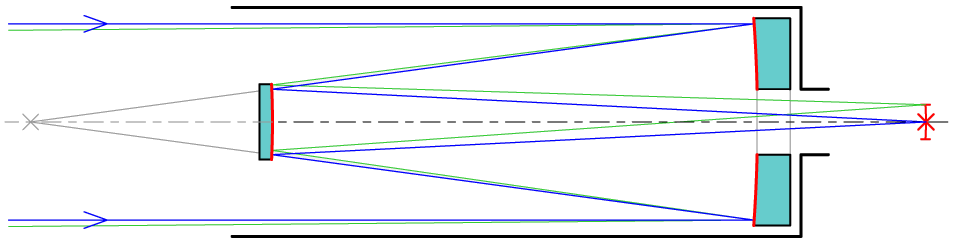
Light path in a Cassegrain Reflector

The Cassegrain reflector is a reflecting telescope design that solved the problem of viewing an image without obstructing the primary mirror by using a convex secondary mirror on the optical axis to bounce the light back through a hole in the primary mirror thus permitting the light to reach an eyepiece.

It first appeared in the eighth edition of the 17th-century French science journal Recueil des mémoires et conférences concernant les arts et les sciences, published by Jean-Baptiste Denys on 25 April 1672. In that edition is found an extract from a letter written by M. de Bercé, writing from Chartres, where he acted as a representative for the Académie des sciences —scholars of Chartres. M. de Bercé reported on a man named Cassegrain who had written a letter on the proper proportions for a megaphone, with an attached note describing a new type of reflecting telescope, the Cassegrain reflector, where a secondary convex mirror is suspended above a primary concave mirror. This was around the time of the publication of the construction of the first practical reflecting telescope, Isaac Newton's Newtonian reflector. On 13 June 1672 Christiaan Huygens wrote about the Cassegrain design and critiqued it harshly, maybe because Huygens felt Newton's design was being "imperilled" by this alternative. Whatever the motives, the storm of controversy that followed had one lasting effect: Cassegrain's name was forgotten.

The identity of this "Cassegrain" has had many theories. His only known publication was the letter on the megaphone/reflecting telescope in the 25 April 1672 Recueil des mémoires et conférences concernant les arts et les sciences. For a long time, reference works were forced to report his first name as "not conclusively known". The Encyclopædia Britannica (15th edition, 1974), for example, only goes as far as listing "Cassegrain, N." (this, in turn, seems to come from Ferdinand Hoefer's Nouvelle biographie générale, Paris, 1855). Other sources have suggested the "N." stood for Nicolas. Some sources (such as La grande encyclopédie, 9, 696) claim his name to be Guillaume, a metal-caster and sculptor who is mentioned in the accounts of King Louis XIV's buildings between 1684 and 1686, and also in a Paris notarized act from 1693. Another name put forward is Jacques, a chirurgeon (i.e., surgeon) mentioned in the Mémoires de l’Académie des sciences as having found, in 1691, a piece of magnet in the steeple of Chartres Cathedral, then being repaired after being damaged by inclement weather.

In 1997 two French astronomers, André Baranne and Françoise Launay, after a long and meticulous investigation including a search for unpublished manuscripts and the analysis of parish registers in the places where Cassegrain lived (Chartres first and then Chaudon, near Nogent-le-Roi), identified Laurent Cassegrain as the most likely candidate.

The crater Cassegrain on the Moon is named after him, even though his true identity was not known at the time of the naming.

== See also ==
- List of Roman Catholic scientist-clerics
