= Jenner (crater) =

Crater on the Moon

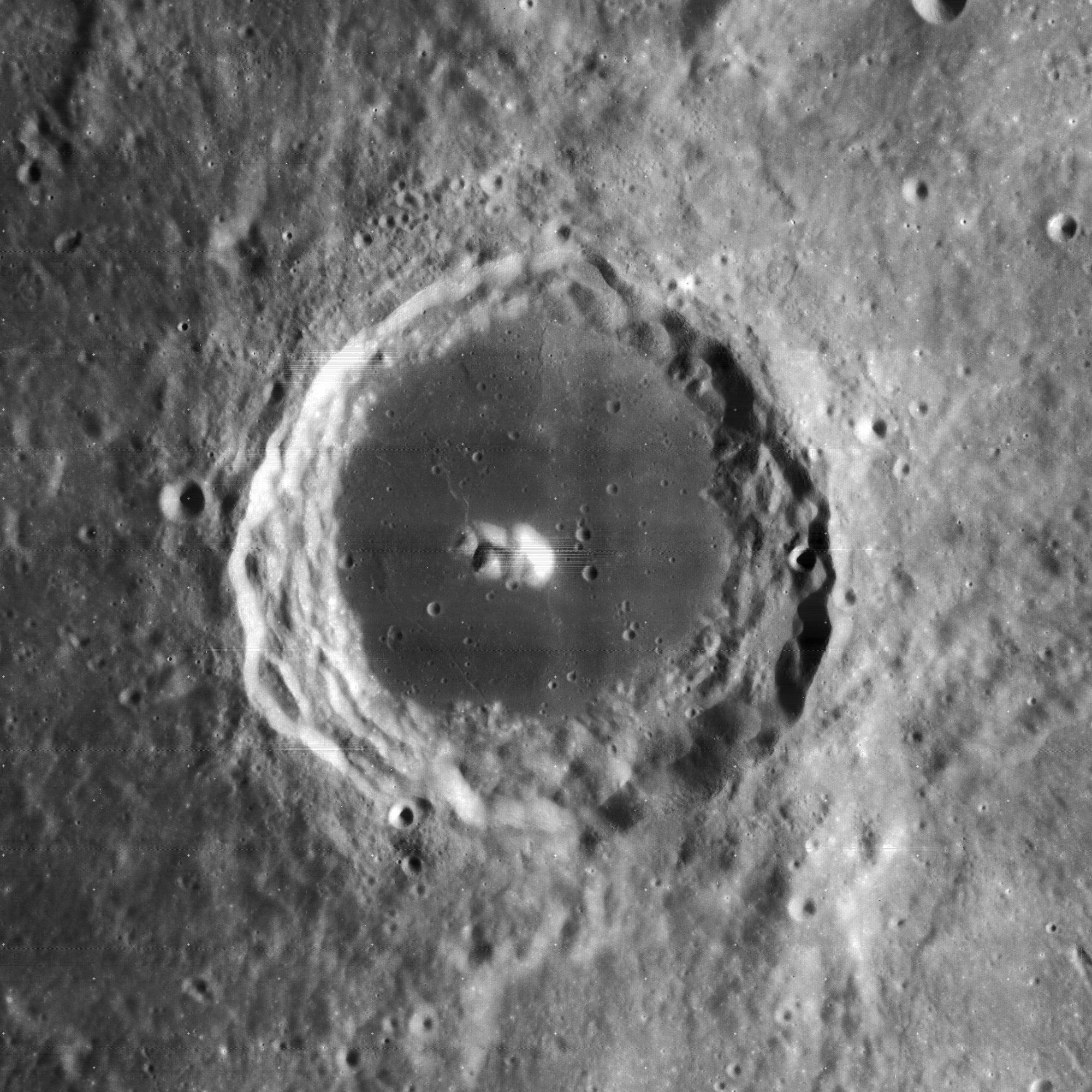
- Lunar Orbiter 4 image
- Coordinates: 42.01°S 95.98°E
- Diameter: 74 km
- Depth: Unknown
- Colongitude: 265° at sunrise
- Formation: Upper Imbrian
- Eponym: Edward Jenner

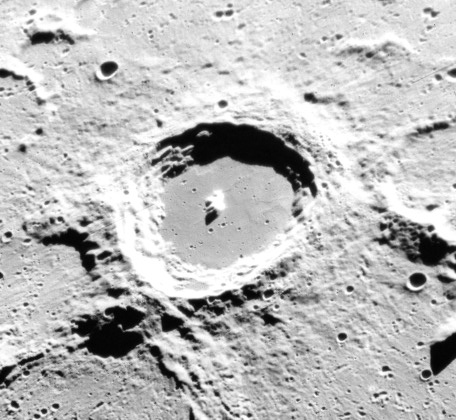
Oblique view from Apollo 15

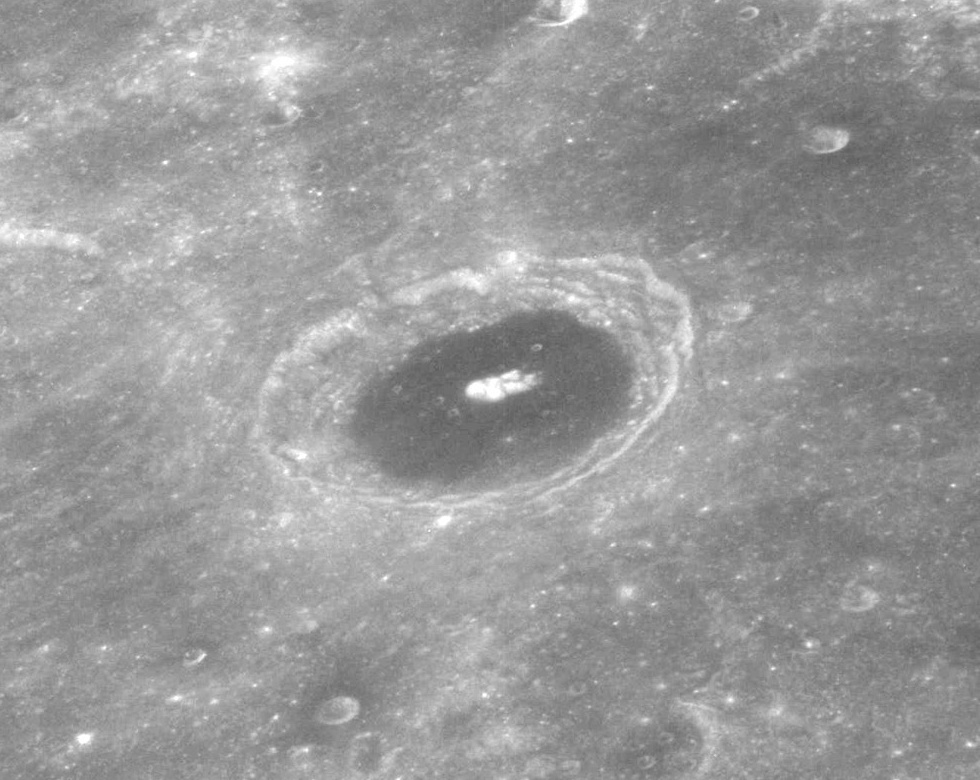
Oblique view from Apollo 8

Jenner is a lunar crater that is located within the Mare Australe. It lies just past the southeastern limb, on the far side of the Moon, and can be viewed from the Earth during periods of favorable libration and lighting. Nearly attached to the eastern outer rim of Jenner is the larger, flooded crater Lamb.

This is a nearly circular crater with a sharp but somewhat irregular edge that has not been significantly eroded. There are some terraces, particularly along the southwestern inner walls, and some slumping along the southeastern rim. The interior floor has been flooded by basaltic lava, leaving a dark, level interior. There are no breaks in the exterior rim where the lava could have entered the crater, so it was presumably flooded from below. The floor is marked only by a few tiny craterlets. Surrounding Jenner is a rampart of ejecta that extends for over a half crater diameter in some directions.

Jenner is a crater of Upper (Late) Imbrian age.

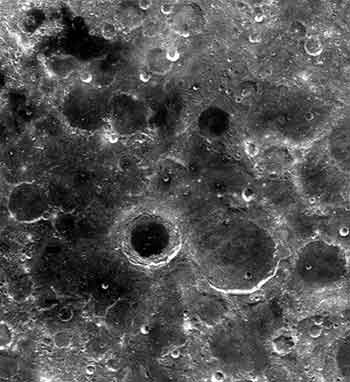
Mare Australe, with the circular basalt-flooded Jenner prominent in the middle.

== Satellite craters ==
By convention these features are identified on lunar maps by placing the letter on the side of the crater midpoint that is closest to Jenner.

Jenner	Coordinates	Diameter, km
M	45.85°S 95.69°E	11
X	37.32°S 93.83°E	12
Y	38.50°S 94.77°E	31
