= Abel (crater) =

Lunar impact crater

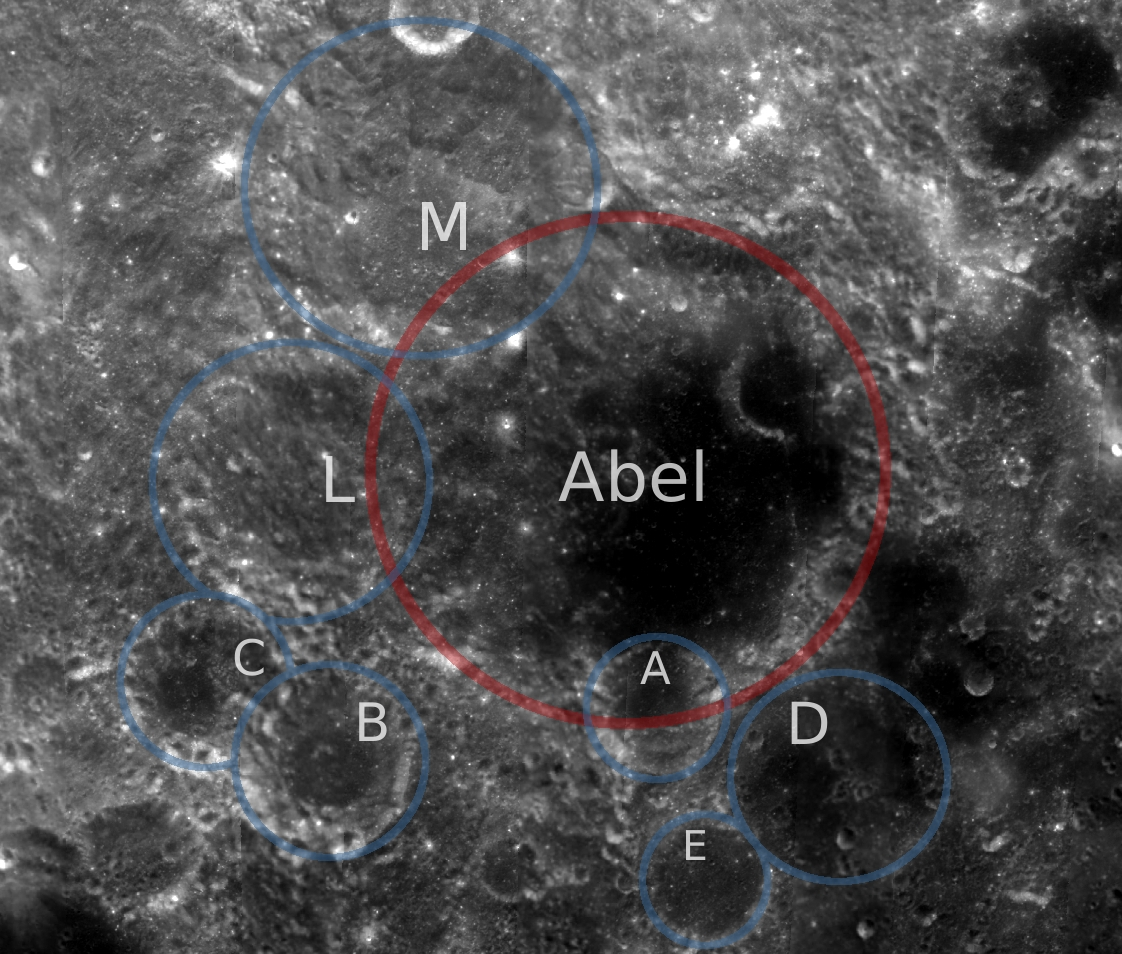
- Abel crater and satellite craters
- Coordinates: 34.5°S 87.3°E
- Diameter: 137.35 km (85.35 mi)
- Depth: 1.19 km (0.74 mi)
- Colongitude: 276° at sunrise
- Eponym: Niels Henrik Abel

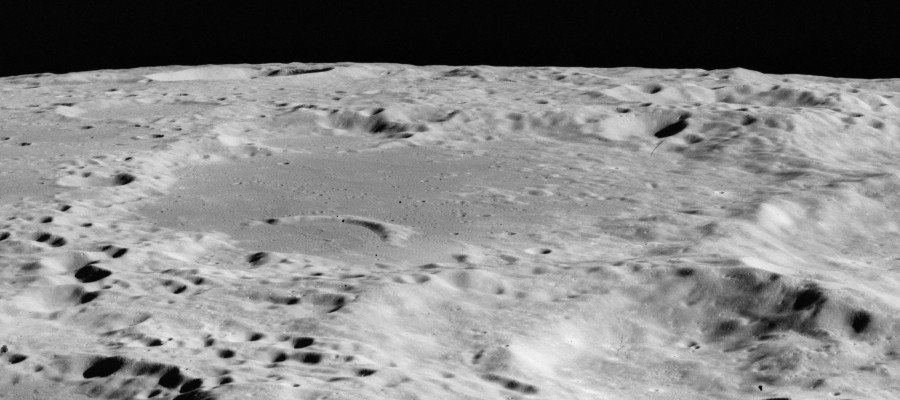
Oblique view facing south from Apollo 15

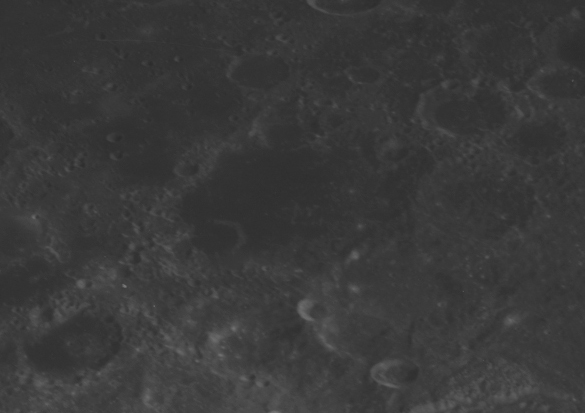
Another oblique view from Apollo 14

Abel is an ancient lunar impact crater that lies near the southeast limb of the Moon's near side. It is located to the south of the crater Barnard, at the northwest edge of the Mare Australe. This crater is the site of a strong magnetic anomaly in the lunar crust. Lunar swirls have been identified in the vicinity.

The rim of Abel is heavily eroded and distorted in shape, forming a somewhat polygonal figure. It is incised and overlaid by past impacts. The satellite crater Abel A overlies the southern rim, while Abel M and Abel L intrude into the western wall.

The eastern floor of Abel has been resurfaced by past lava flows, leaving a relatively smooth, flat surface with a low albedo. The remains of a small crater rim protrude near the northeast wall. The western floor is rougher in texture and matches the albedo of the surrounding surface.

The crater was named for the Norwegian mathematician Niels Henrik Abel (1802-1829). Its designation was adopted by the International Astronomical Union in 1964. The name was introduced into lunar nomenclature by German astronomer Julius Franz in 1906.

== Satellite craters ==
By convention these features are identified on lunar maps by placing the letter on the side of the crater midpoint that is closest to Abel.

Abel	Latitude	Longitude	Diameter
A	36.6° S	86.0° E	19 km
B	36.7° S	82.8° E	41 km
C	36.0° S	81.0° E	31 km
D	37.7° S	87.7° E	30 km
E	37.8° S	86.5° E	13 km
J	35.5° S	79.0° E	11 km
K	35.0° S	77.2° E	9 km
L	34.4° S	82.6° E	67 km
M	32.2° S	83.6° E	81 km
