= Lamb (crater) =

Lunar crater

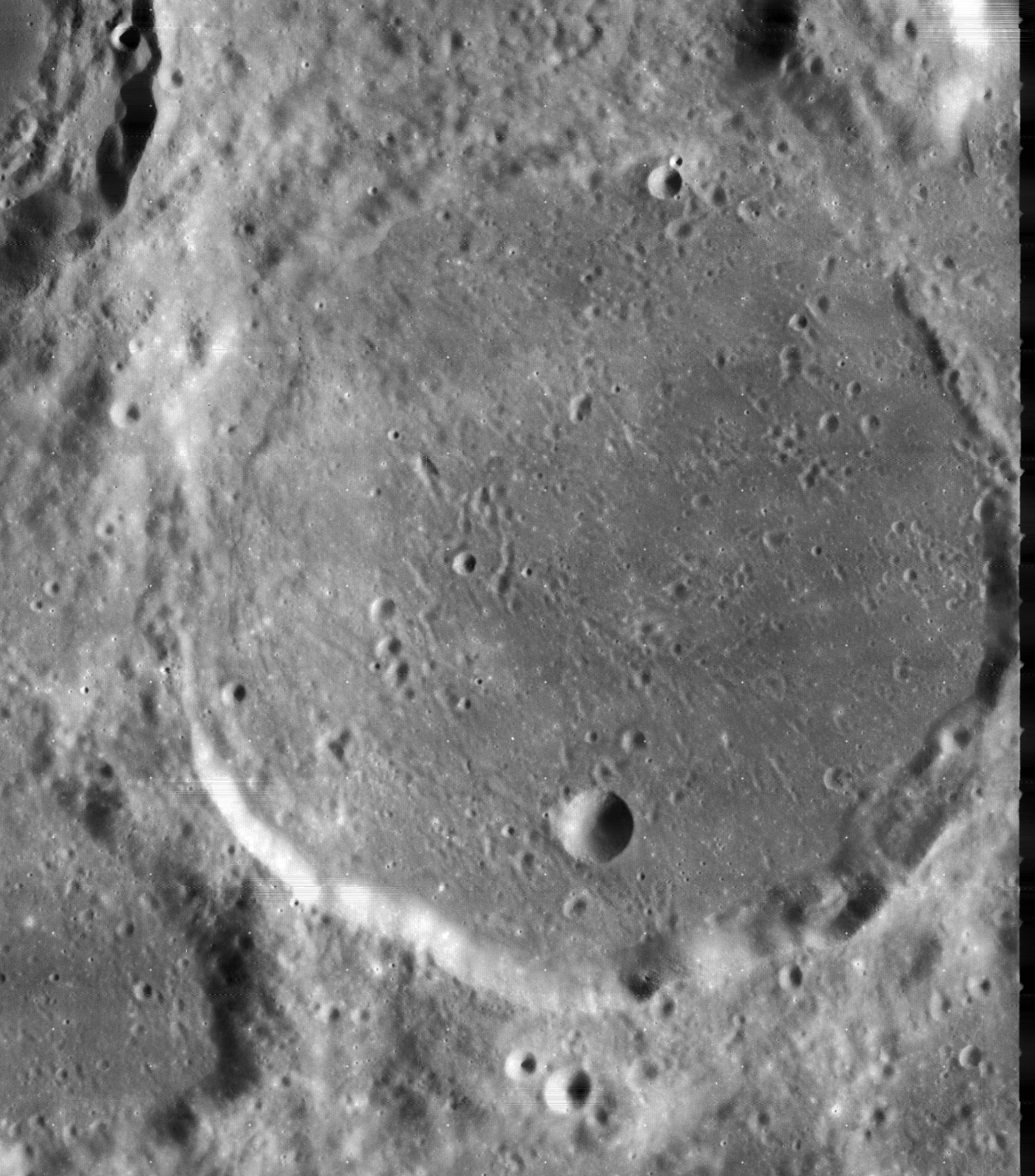
- Lunar Orbiter 4 image
- Coordinates: 42.9°S 100.1°E
- Diameter: 106 km
- Depth: Unknown
- Colongitude: 262° at sunrise
- Eponym: Horace Lamb

Lamb is a lunar crater that lies beyond the southeastern limb on the Moon's far side. It is located in an irregular lunar mare region named Mare Australe, just to the east of the crater Jenner.

This crater has a slender inner wall and an interior floor that has been resurfaced by basaltic lava. The rim is somewhat worn and irregular, but retains a generally circular shape and is not overlaid by any smaller craters of significance. The interior floor is marked only by a multitude of tiny craters, and a small, unnamed crater in the south-southeastern section.

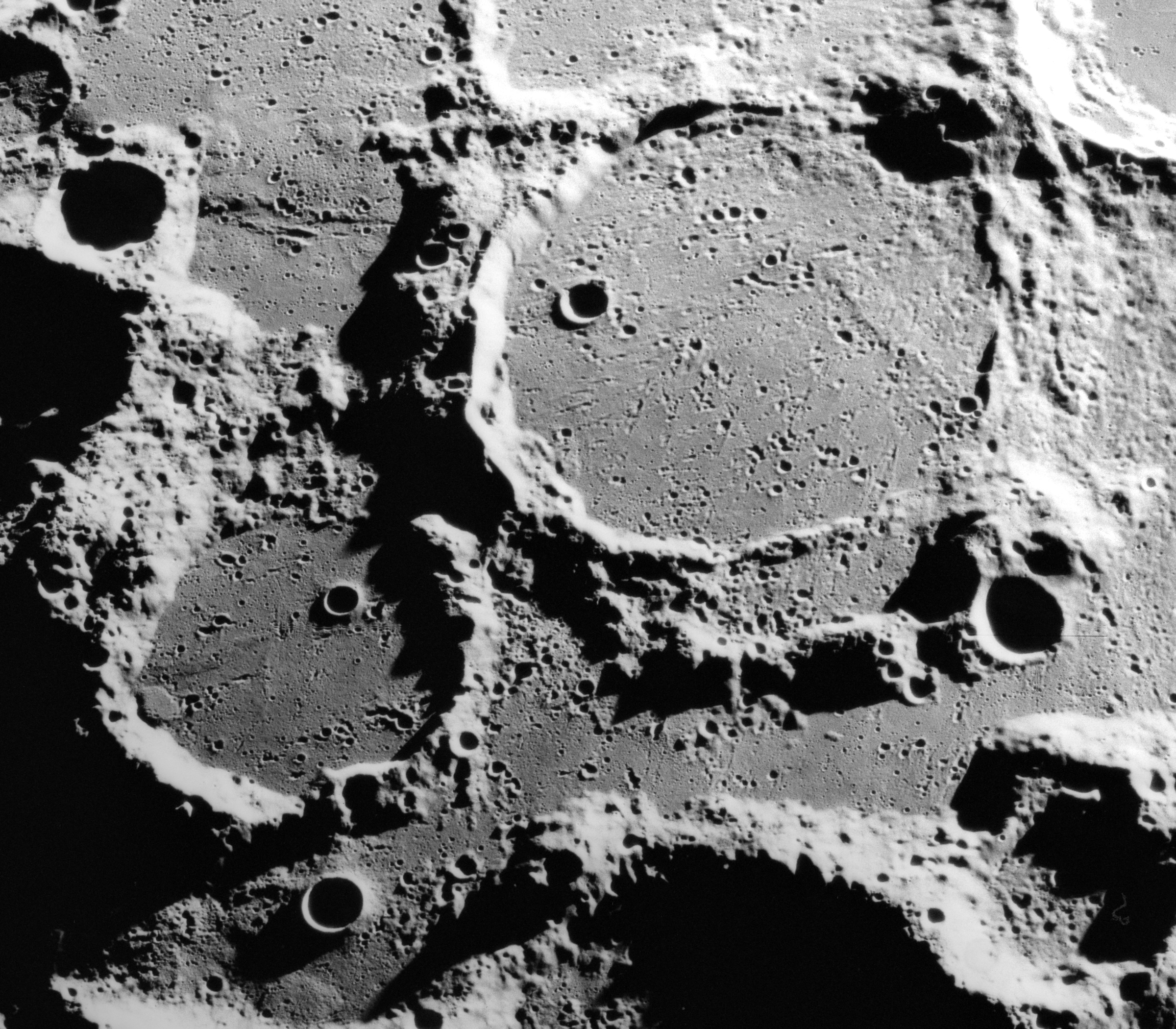
Oblique view of Lamb and its satellite craters. Lamb is largest crater in upper right, and Lamb G is in lower left. Lamb E is small crater below G. Lamb A is small crater to lower right of Lamb.

The exterior of the crater consists of the outer rampart and sections of rough terrain. This in turn is nearly enclosed by lava-flooded sections of the surface belonging to the Mare Australe. To the east of Lamb is Lamb G, a somewhat smaller, lava-flooded formation.

The crater is named after Sir Horace Lamb, an English mathematician.

== Satellite craters ==
By convention these features are identified on lunar maps by placing the letter on the side of the crater midpoint that is closest to Lamb.

Lamb	Latitude	Longitude	Diameter
A	39.9° S	101.6° E	20 km
E	41.6° S	107.1° E	11 km
G	43.2° S	105.9° E	69 km
