= Mare Australe =

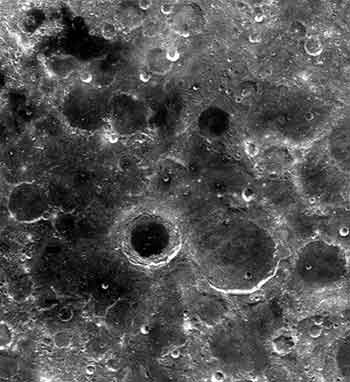
- Mare Australe. The basalt-flooded crater Jenner is near the middle of this photo, with Lamb just to the right.
- Coordinates: 38.9°S 93.0°E
- Diameter: 997 km (620 mi)
- Eponym: Southern Sea

Mare Australe /ɔːˈstreɪliː/ (Latin austrāle the "Southern Sea") is a lunar mare located in the southeastern hemisphere of the Moon. It is 997 kilometers in diameter, overlapping the near and far sides of the Moon. Smooth, dark volcanic basalt lines the bottom of the mare. The Australe basin was formed in the Pre-Nectarian epoch, while the mare material inside formed in the Upper Imbrian epoch. The basin was almost completely destroyed by impacts prior to the appearance of the mare.

Unlike most of the lunar maria, Mare Australe has an uneven surface that is marked by a number of crater impacts. Examples of these include the craters Jenner and Lamb, which are flooded with basaltic lava much like many of the other crater features in this mare. The selenographic coordinates of this mare are 38.9° S, 93.0° E. The eastern half of the mare lies on the far side of the Moon, although it can be viewed in its entirety during periods of favorable libration.

== Gallery ==
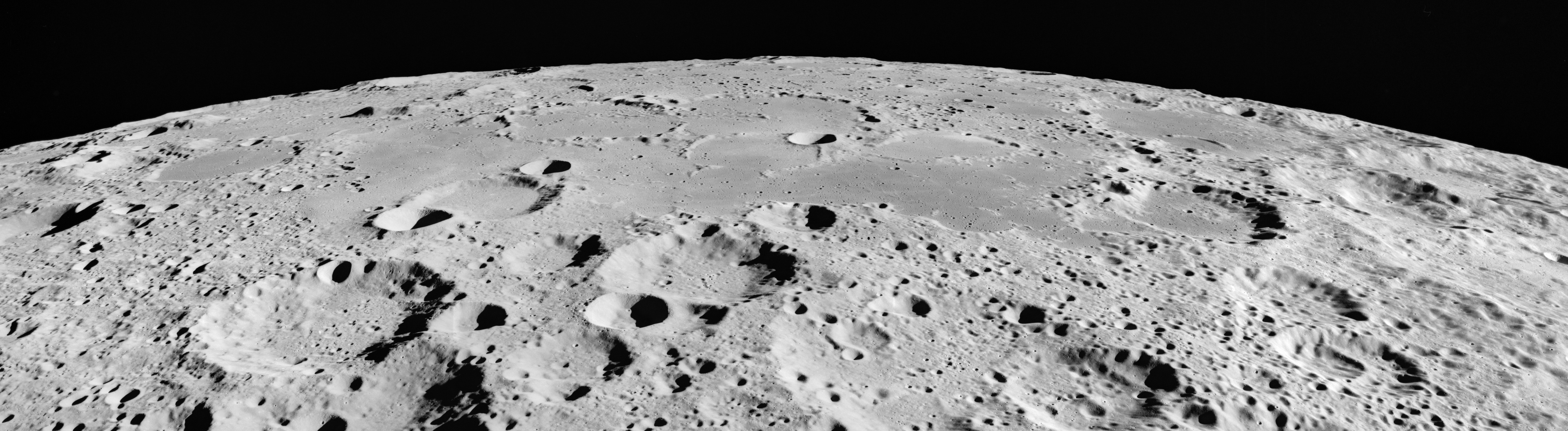
Oblique view of Mare Australe on the moon, facing south, from Apollo 15. The crater Abel is at right, Gernsback is at left, with Donner in the left foreground. The craters Lamb, Jenner, and Gum are visible on the horizon (from left to right).

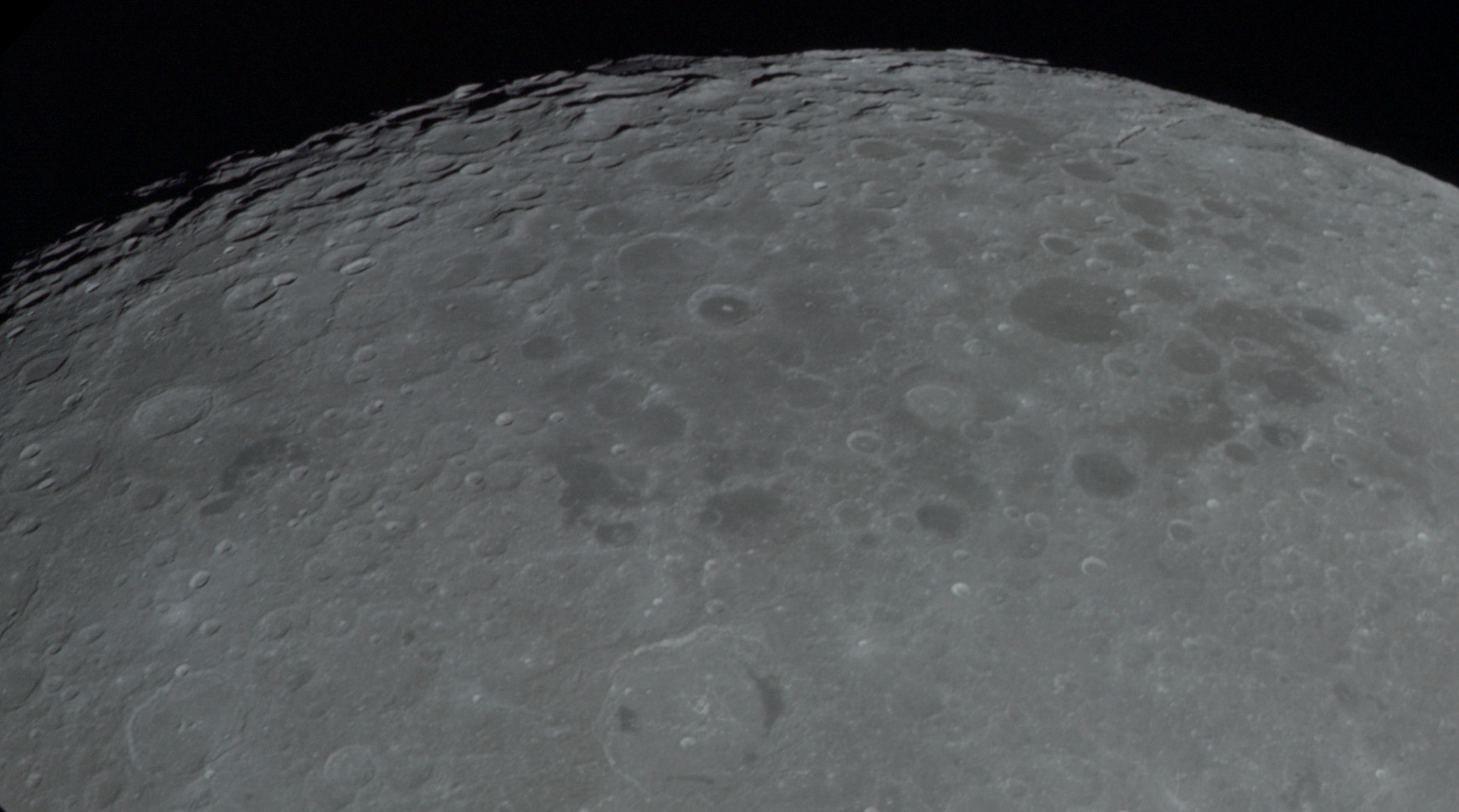
A more distant view from Apollo 14

== See also ==
- Volcanism on the Moon
