= Astronomical Observatory of the University of Warsaw =

Observatory in Poland

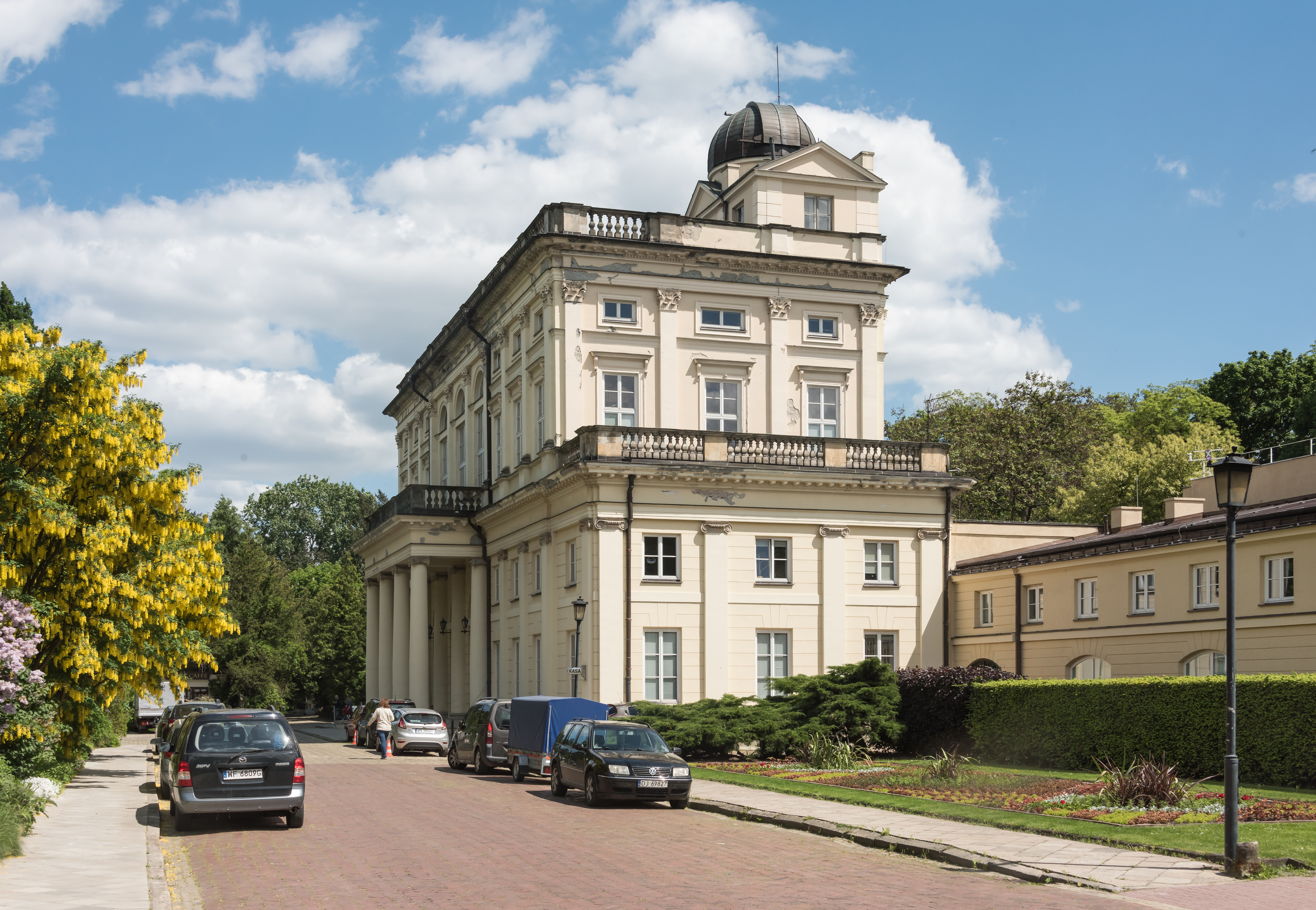
- Other name: Obserwatorium Astronomiczne Uniwersytetu Warszawskiego
- Established: 1825
- Head: Tomasz Bulik
- Location: Warsaw, Poland
- Website: https://www.astrouw.edu.pl/en/

The Astronomical Observatory of the University of Warsaw (Polish: Obserwatorium Astronomiczne Uniwersytetu Warszawskiego) is an institute that conducts research and teaching in astronomy. The Observatory provides astronomy classes for bachelor master, and doctorate students. Student telescope activities take place at the observing station in Ostrowik. The scientific research is conducted in a wide range of topics including two main observing projects that are long-term optical sky surveys: OGLE and ASAS. Both these surveys take sky images using dedicated telescopes located at the Las Campanas Observatory, Chile. Scientific staff takes part in large astrophysical collaborations, both ground-based (H.E.S.S., CTA, and LIGO/VIRGO) and satellite (Planck and Gaia).

== History ==
The Observatory building was opened in 1825 and the first director was Franciszek Armiński. The building is situated inside Botanical Garden University of Warsaw and next to Łazienki Park. Early on, the main equipment of the Observatory were meridian circles that were used for astrometric observations, geodetic measurements, and time keeping. At the onset of the World War I, part of the equipment was moved to Russia.

In 1937, an observing station run by the Observatory was opened at the Pip Ivan peak (currently in Ukraine) as a part of the White Elephant building. The White Elephant was built by the Airborne and Antigas Defence League. The main instrument at this observing station was 33 cm astrograph build by the Grubb Parsons company. The building was abandoned just after the Soviet aggression on Poland in September 1939. There was only a single research paper published based on observations from Pip Ivan and the station was not used for astronomical research later on.

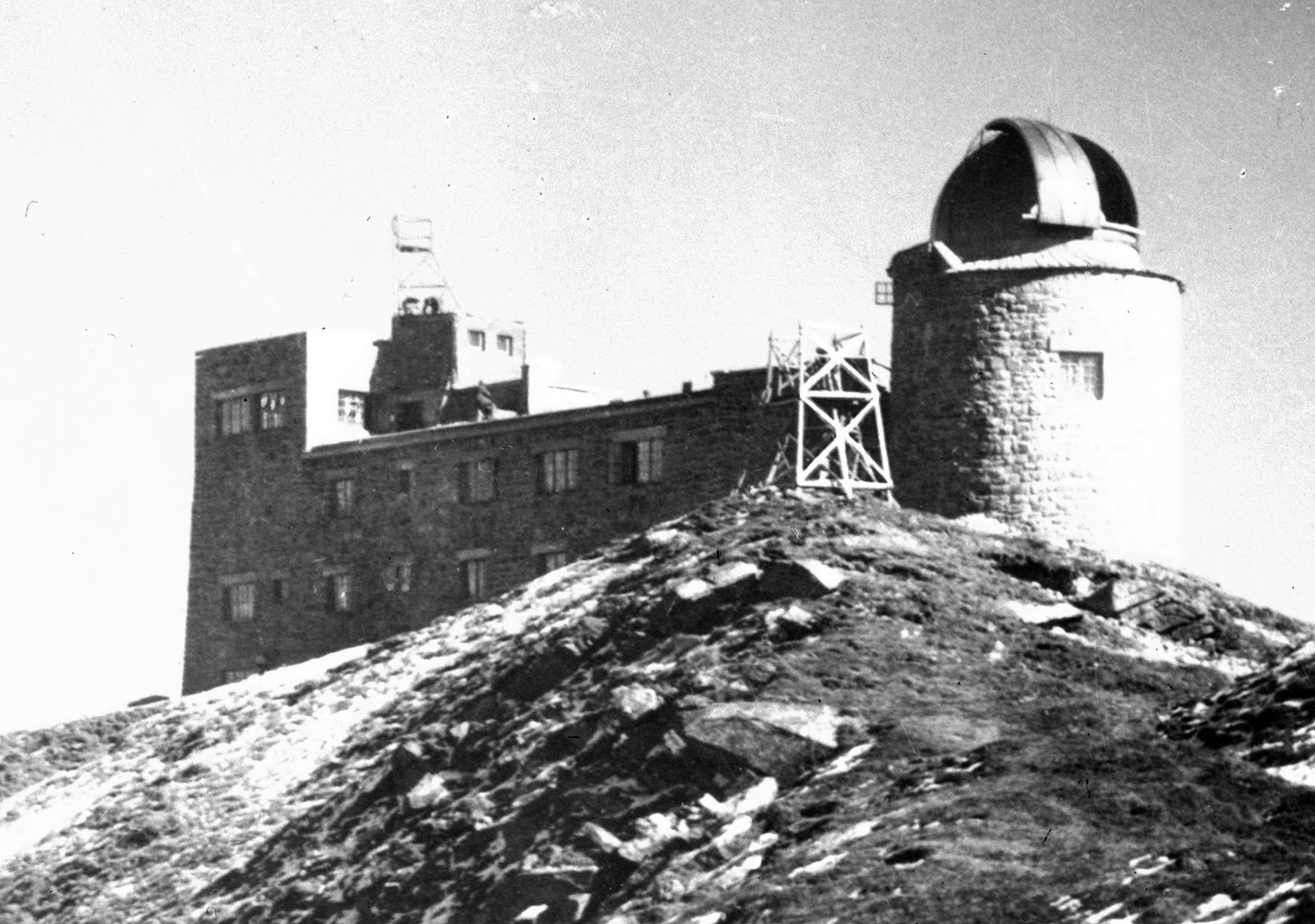
Observing station at Pip Ivan during construction in 1930s.

After the German invasion of Poland, the University of Warsaw was closed but the Observatory was re-opened by the occupant. Very limited research was allowed and the main activity was time keeping. During the Warsaw Uprising the Observatory staff was forced to leave Warsaw and the building was burned by German soldiers. In February 1945, the Observatory was re-established in Kraków. Over next few years, the building in Warsaw was rebuilt and astronomers moved back. At the same time an observing station was established at Ostrowik village near Warsaw. In 1973 the 60 cm telescope was opened in Ostrowik. The research interests of the Observatory after the World War II changed to astrophysics. The first post-war professors were Włodzimierz Zonn and Stefan Piotrowski (starting in 1950s). Their most well known junior colleague was Bohdan Paczyński.

The Observatory hosted a PDP-11/45 computer from 1975 till 1978. The computer was owned by the Polish Academy of Sciences and it was moved to a newly established Nicolaus Copernicus Astronomical Center of the PAS.

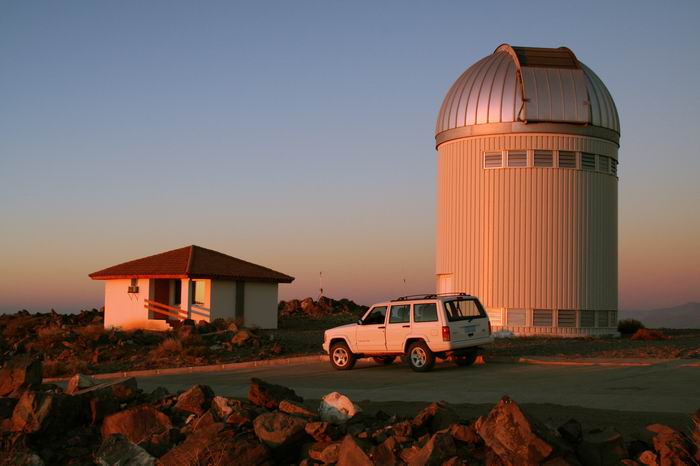
Dome of the OGLE telescope at the Las Campanas Observatory (Chile).

The observing capabilities of the Observatory astronomers improved significantly with an advancement of the CCD cameras in astronomy. The first CCD camera in Poland was built for Ostrowik 60 cm telescope by Andrzej Udalski in 1991. The next year, Warsaw astronomers led by Andrzej Udalski and supported by Bohdan Paczyński (at the Princeton University then) started the OGLE project. The OGLE observations were first taken with the Swope telescope at the Las Camapanas Observatory (Chile). In 1996, a 1.3 m telescope dedicated to the OGLE project was opened. At the same time, another Warsaw astronomer, Grzegorz Pojmański, started ASAS survey, which was an implementation of an idea proposed by Paczyński.

== Notable employees and students ==
- Adam Prażmowski – first astronomer who observed polarization of solar corona during a total eclipse, which proved that the corona is associated with Sun, not Moon.
- Jan Gadomski – employee, active observer, a lunar crater was named after him.
- Elena Kazimirtchak-Polonskaïa – the only PhD recipient during the interwar period, studied comets.
- Bohdan Paczyński – astrophysicist known for his works on microlensing, stellar evolution, and gamma ray bursts.
- Krzysztof Stanek – alumnus known for his research on massive stars and supernovae explosions; one of the leaders of ASAS-SN survey.
- Andrzej Udalski – head of the OGLE survey.
- Anna Żytkow – alumnus known for suggesting, jointly with Kip Thorne, that there could exist a giant star with a neutron star in its core, called Thorne–Żytkow object.

== Gallery ==
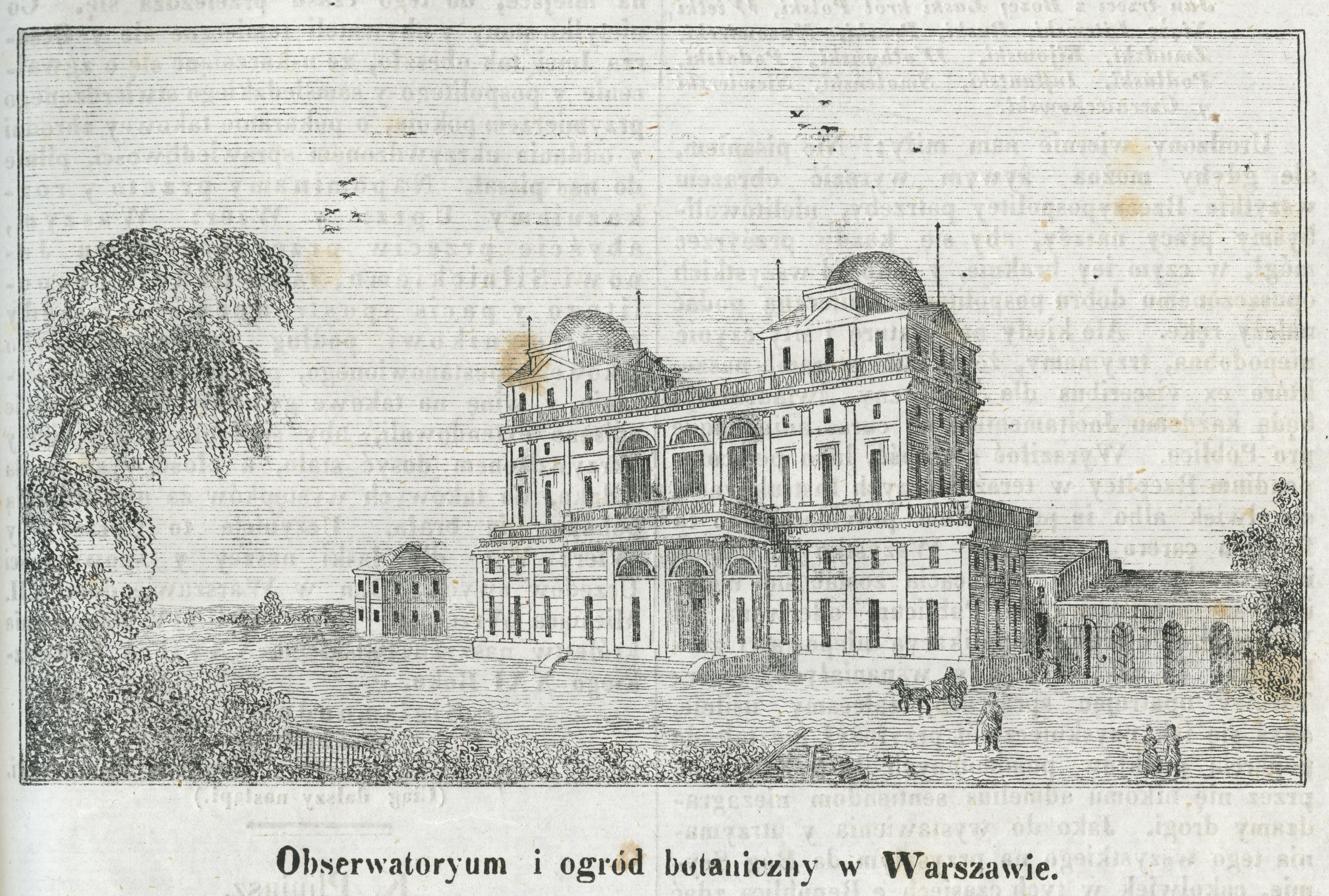
Sketch of the Observatory building (1837).

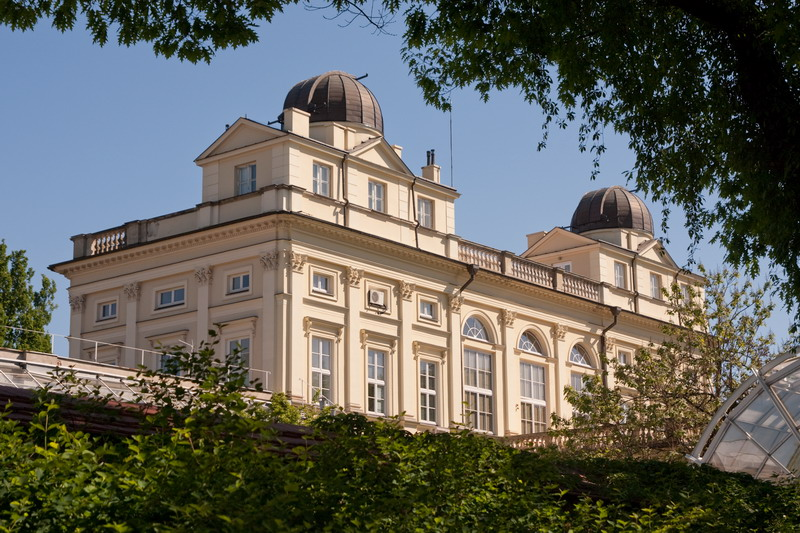
South-West view of the building.
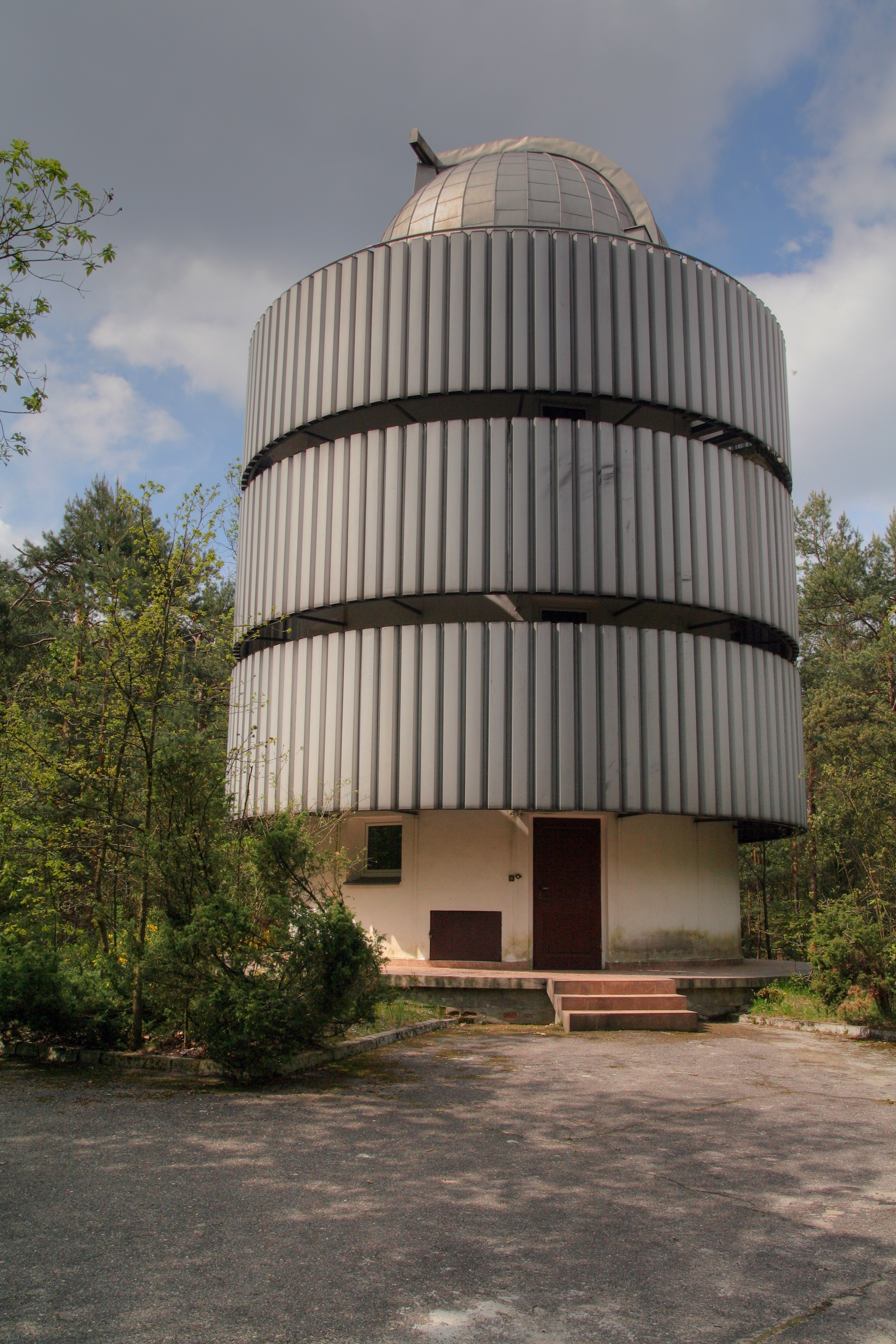
Dome of the 0.6 m telescope in Ostrowik.

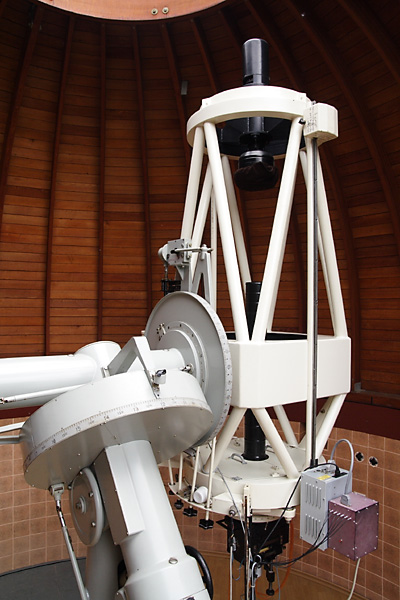
0.6 m telescope in Ostrowik.

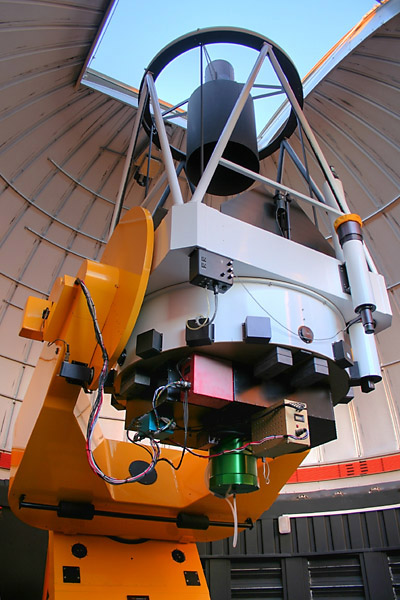
OGLE 1.3 m telescope at the Las Campanas Observatory (Chile).
