= Gadomski =

Gadomski may refer to:

- Gadomski (crater), a lunar crater
- Gadomski (surname)
