= Schlesinger (crater) =

Crater on the Moon

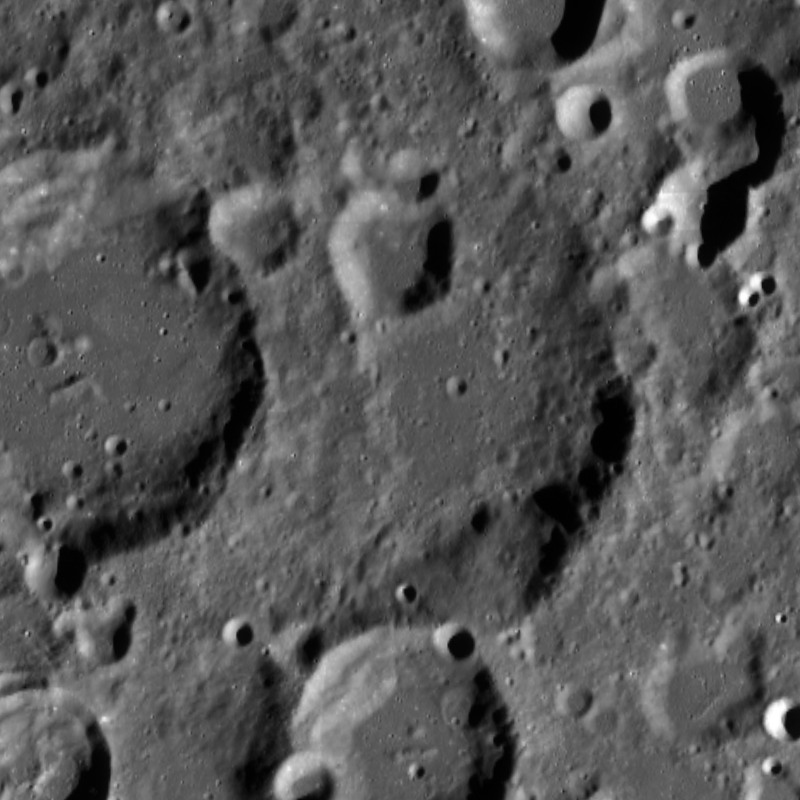
- LRO image
- Coordinates: 47.4°N 138.6°W
- Diameter: 97 km
- Depth: Unknown
- Colongitude: 140° at sunrise
- Formation: Pre-Nectarian
- Eponym: Frank Schlesinger

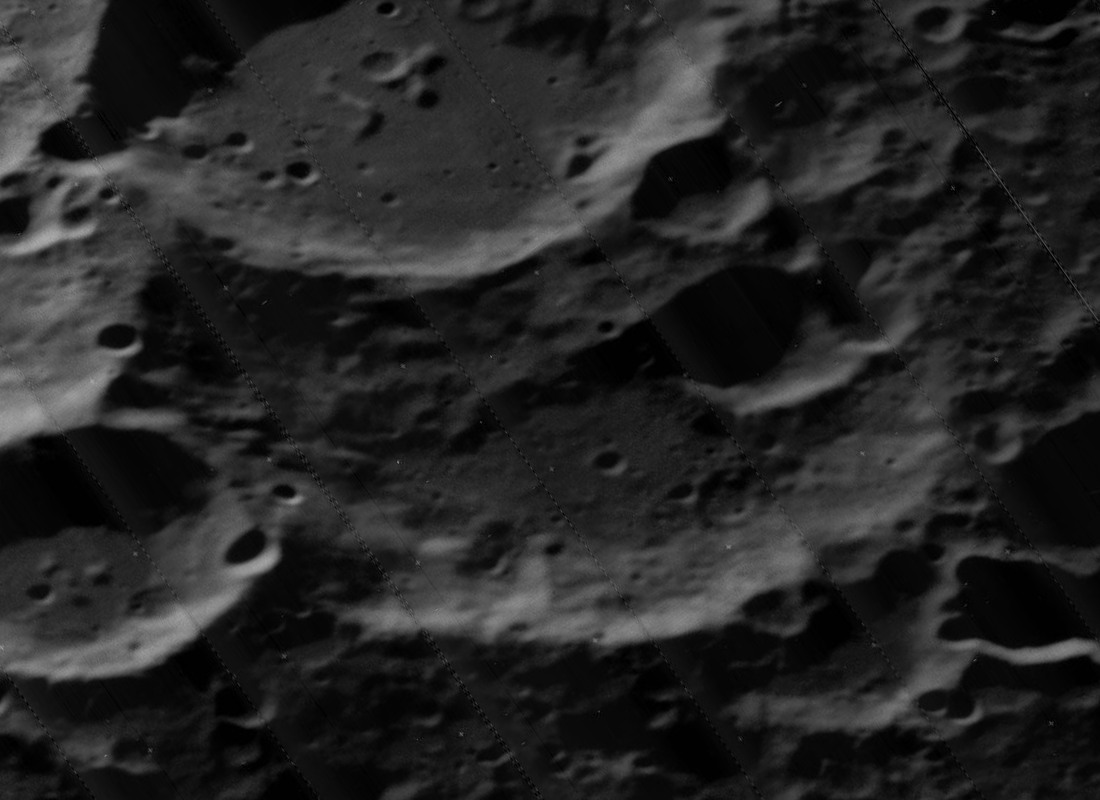
Oblique Lunar Orbiter 5 image

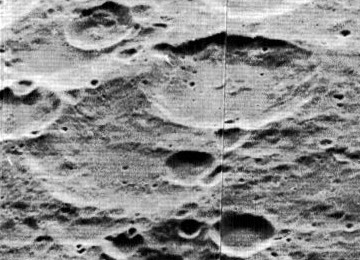
Oblique view of Esnault-Pelterie (upper right) and Schlesinger (lower left), from Lunar Orbiter 5

Schlesinger is a lunar impact crater on the far side of the Moon. On the lunar geologic timescale, it dates to the Pre-Nectarian epoch. The crater Esnault-Pelterie overlies the western part of the rim and the outer rampart of that crater has covered about half the interior floor, leaving a crescent-shaped feature. To the south-southwest of Schlesinger is the crater Von Zeipel and to the southeast lies Quetelet.

In addition to the overlapping Esnault-Pelterie, the rim of Schlesinger is overlain by the satellite crater Schlesinger M along the southern rim and a small crater along the northern rim. The remaining rim is heavily worn and the features have been rounded. Only about half the interior floor remains uncovered, and this is relatively level and marked only by a few small craterlets.

== Satellite craters ==
By convention these features are identified on lunar maps by placing the letter on the side of the crater midpoint that is closest to Schlesinger.

Schlesinger	Latitude	Longitude	Diameter
A	50.1° N	137.2° W	32 km
B	51.4° N	134.9° W	66 km
M	45.2° N	138.5° W	45 km
