= Quetelet (crater) =

Lunar impact crater

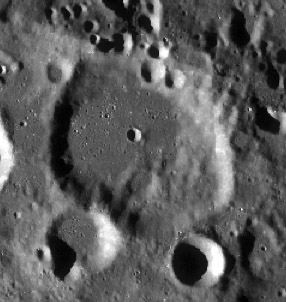
- LRO image
- Coordinates: 42.66°N 135.30°W
- Diameter: 54.77 km (34.03 mi)
- Colongitude: 136° at sunrise
- Eponym: L. Adolphe J. Quételet

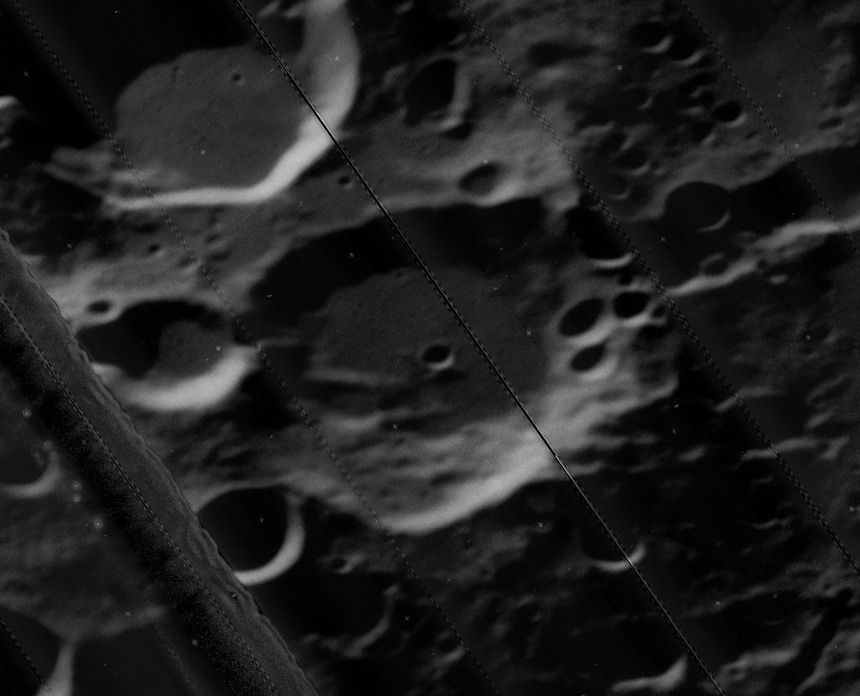
Oblique Lunar Orbiter 5 image (band crossing image is artifact of original)

Quetelet is a lunar impact crater, approximately 55 kilometers in diameter, that lies in the Moon's northern hemisphere, on the far side from the Earth. It lies to the southeast of the crater Schlesinger, and to the east of Von Zeipel. To the east of Quetelet is Perrine.

As is the case with many of the craters on the Moon, this feature has become worn and eroded by subsequent impacts. A small crater with a flat floor intrudes into the southwestern rim of Quetelet. Several small craterlets lie along the northern rim and the inner wall. The inner wall of Quetelet is narrower in the west than elsewhere, so that the level, relatively featureless interior floor is offset in that direction. The worn remains of a small craterlet lies along the southern inner wall.

Prior to formal naming by the IAU in 1970, Quetelet was called Crater 89.

== Satellite craters ==
By convention these features are identified on lunar maps by placing the letter on the side of the crater midpoint that is closest to Quetelet.

Quetelet	Latitude	Longitude	Diameter	Ref
T	42.8° N	137.6° W	46.98 km	WGPSN

== See also ==
- 1239 Queteleta, asteroid
