= Klute (crater) =

Crater on the Moon

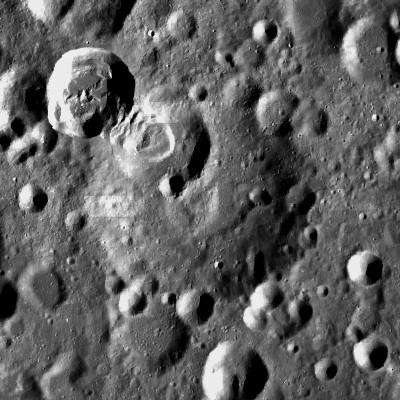
- LRO image
- Coordinates: 37.2°N 141.3°W
- Diameter: 75 km
- Depth: Unknown
- Colongitude: 142° at sunrise
- Eponym: Daniel O. Klute

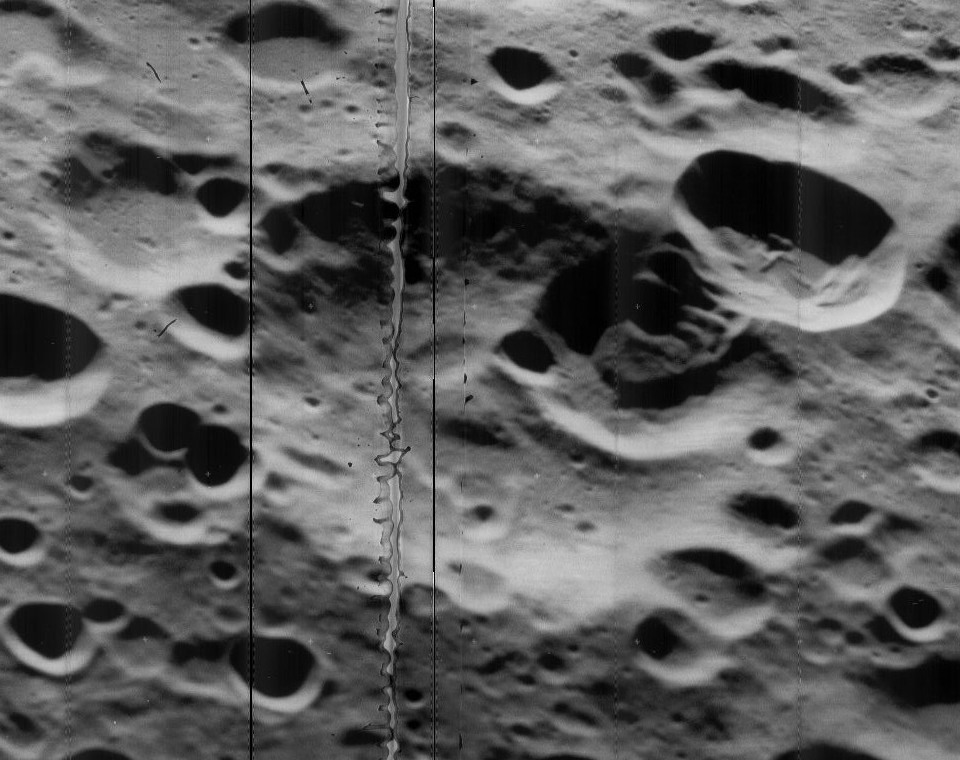
Oblique Lunar Orbiter 5 image, facing west.

Klute is a crater on the Moon's far side. It lies to the southeast of the larger walled plain named Fowler, and east of the crater Gadomski.

Klute is a heavily worn crater with multiple smaller craters along the outer rim. The infrared spectrum of pure crystalline plagioclase has been identified on the southwest wall. The satellite crater Klute W impacted to the northwest of Klute, and a large slump or landslide has occurred where material has flowed into the unnamed crater within Klute. The remainder of the floor is an uneven plain marked with several small, eroded craters.

This crater was named after Daniel Klute in 1970, a scientist who helped develop engines for the Saturn V rocket before he died in 1964.

== Satellite craters ==
By convention these features are identified on lunar maps by placing the letter on the side of the crater midpoint that is closest to Klute.

Klute	Latitude	Longitude	Diameter
M	35.1° N	141.1° W	24 km
W	38.2° N	143.0° W	13 km
X	39.5° N	143.0° W	40 km

== Sources ==
- Andersson, L. E.; Whitaker, E. A. (1982). NASA Catalogue of Lunar Nomenclature. NASA RP-1097.
- Blue, Jennifer (July 25, 2007). "Gazetteer of Planetary Nomenclature". USGS.
- Bussey, B.; Spudis, P. (2004). The Clementine Atlas of the Moon. New York: Cambridge University Press. ISBN 978-0-521-81528-4.
- Cocks, Elijah E.; Cocks, Josiah C. (1995). Who's Who on the Moon: A Biographical Dictionary of Lunar Nomenclature. Tudor Publishers. ISBN 978-0-936389-27-1.
- McDowell, Jonathan (July 15, 2007). "Lunar Nomenclature". Jonathan's Space Report. Archived from the original on 2012-02-08.
- Menzel, D. H.; Minnaert, M.; Levin, B.; Dollfus, A.; Bell, B. (1971). "Report on Lunar Nomenclature by the Working Group of Commission 17 of the IAU". Space Science Reviews. 12 (2): 136–186. Bibcode:1971SSRv...12..136M. doi:10.1007/BF00171763. S2CID 122125855.
- Moore, Patrick (2001). On the Moon. Sterling Publishing Co. ISBN 978-0-304-35469-6.
- Price, Fred W. (1988). The Moon Observer's Handbook. Cambridge University Press. ISBN 978-0-521-33500-3.
- Rükl, Antonín (1990). Atlas of the Moon. Kalmbach Books. ISBN 978-0-913135-17-4.
- Webb, Rev. T. W. (1962). Celestial Objects for Common Telescopes (6th revised ed.). Dover. ISBN 978-0-486-20917-3.
- Whitaker, Ewen A. (1999). Mapping and Naming the Moon. Cambridge University Press. ISBN 978-0-521-62248-6.
- Wlasuk, Peter T. (2000). Observing the Moon. Springer. ISBN 978-1-85233-193-1.
