= Esnault-Pelterie (crater) =

Crater on the Moon

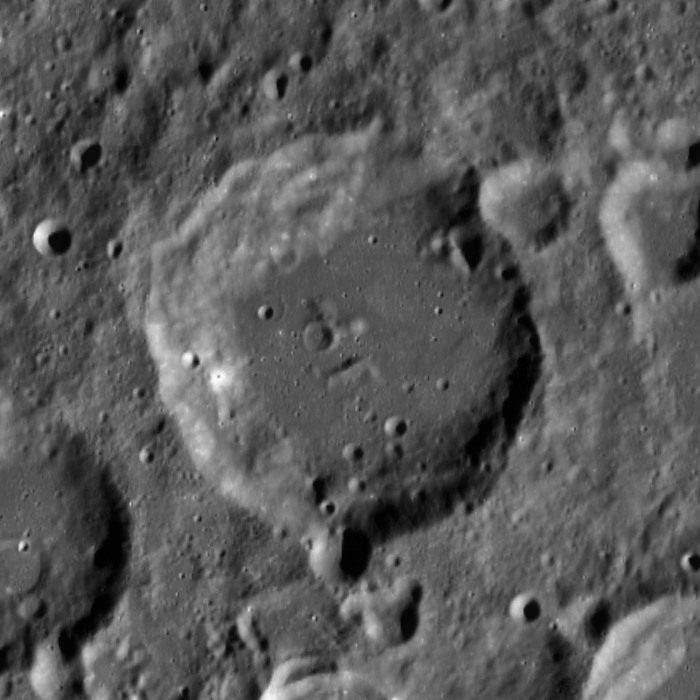
- LRO image
- Coordinates: 47.7°N 141.4°W
- Diameter: 76.79 km (47.72 mi)
- Depth: Unknown
- Colongitude: 143° at sunrise
- Formation: Nectarian or Pre-Nectarian
- Eponym: R. A. C. Esnault-Pelterie

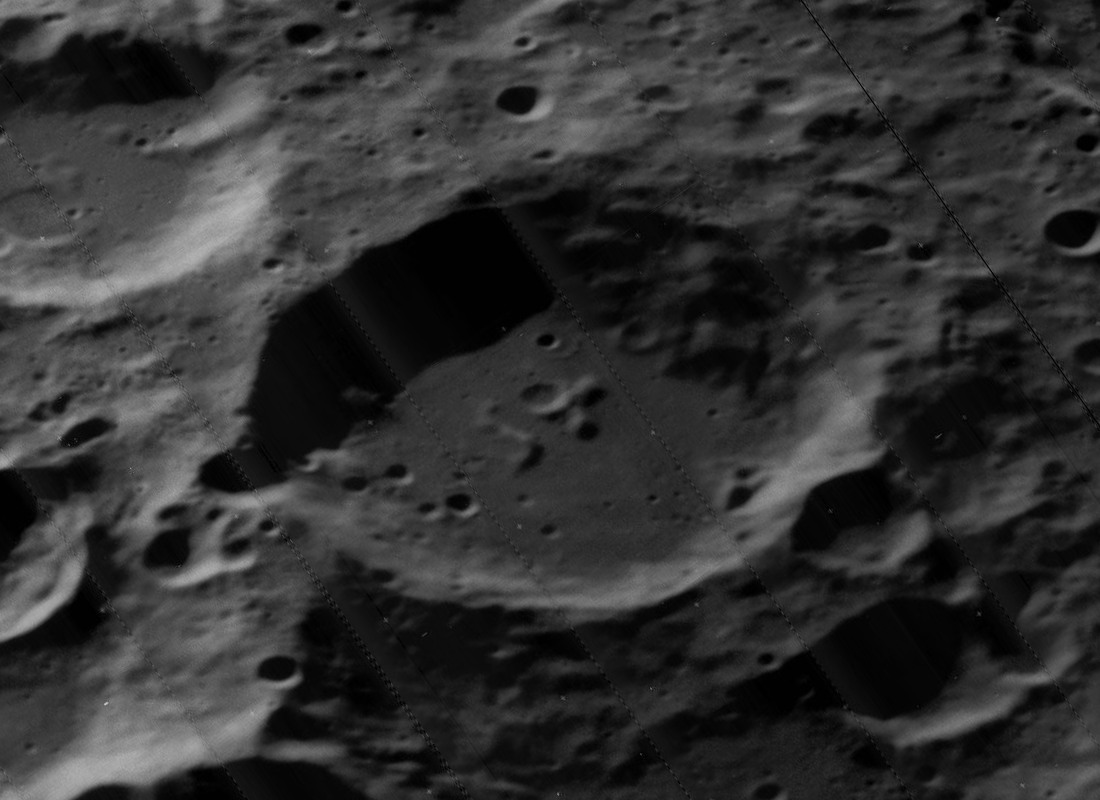
Oblique Lunar Orbiter 5 image

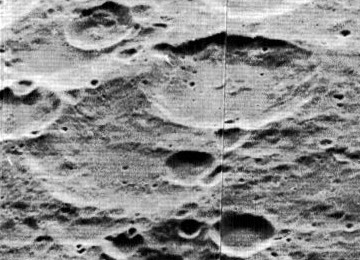
Oblique view of Esnault-Pelterie (upper right) and Schlesinger (lower left), from Lunar Orbiter 5

Esnault-Pelterie is a lunar impact crater on the far side of the Moon. It is located in the northern hemisphere, to the south of the crater Carnot. Esnault-Pelterie overlies the western side of the crater Schlesinger. To the south is the crater Von Zeipel and to the southwest is Fowler.

On the lunar geologic timescale, this crater dates to the Nectarian or possibly the Pre-Nectarian epoch. The rim of this crater is somewhat worn, but still retains some structure and a relatively clear edge. There is a small crater attached to the southern rim that cuts into the interior through a narrow gap, and a crater intrudes into the northeast rim. Within the interior are several small craterlets, and a small rise offset to the north of the midpoint. There is a level region to the northeast of the central rise, and a smaller one to the southwest.

This formation is named after French rocketry and astronautics pioneer Robert Esnault-Pelterie (1881-1957). Its designation was officially adopted by the International Astronomical Union in 1970.

== See also ==
- French space program
- Astronautics
