= 1239 Queteleta =

Main-belt asteroid

Discovery
- Discovered by: E. Delporte
- Discovery site: Uccle Obs.
- Discovery date: 4 February 1932

Designations
- Pronunciation: kətlɛta
- Named after: Adolphe Quetelet (Belgian astronomer)
- Alternative designations: 1932 CB · 1978 TH_{3}
- Minor planet category: main-belt · (middle) background

Orbital characteristics
- Epoch 4 September 2017 (JD 2458000.5)
- Uncertainty parameter 0
- Observation arc: 85.80 yr (31,340 d)
- Aphelion: 3.2824 AU
- Perihelion: 2.0383 AU
- Semi-major axis: 2.6603 AU
- Eccentricity: 0.2338
- Orbital period (sidereal): 4.34 yr (1,585 days)
- Mean anomaly: 271.62°
- Mean motion: 0° 13^{m} 37.56^{s} / day
- Inclination: 1.6619°
- Longitude of ascending node: 73.160°
- Argument of perihelion: 35.475°

Physical characteristics
- Dimensions: 15.94±1.8 km 18.032±0.076 km
- Geometric albedo: 0.051±0.013; 0.0695±0.019
- Absolute magnitude (H): 12.4 · 12.5

1239 Queteleta (kətlɛta), provisional designation 1932 CB, is a dark background asteroid from the central regions of the asteroid belt, approximately 17 kilometers in diameter. It was discovered on 4 February 1932, by Belgian astronomer Eugène Delporte at the Royal Observatory of Belgium in Uccle. The asteroid was named after Adolphe Quetelet, a Belgian astronomer and mathematician.

== Discovery ==
Queteleta was discovered on 4 February 1932, by Belgian astronomer Eugène Delporte at the Royal Observatory of Belgium in Uccle. It was independently discovered by Louis Boyer at Algiers Observatory, Algeria, on the same night and by George Van Biesbroeck at Yerkes Observatory, United States, on 13 February 1932. The Minor Planet Center only recognizes the first mentioned discoverer.

== Orbit and classification ==
Queteleta is a non-family asteroid from the main belt's background population. It orbits the Sun in the central main-belt at a distance of 2.0–3.3 AU once every 4 years and 4 months (1,585 days; semi-major axis of 2.66 AU). Its orbit has an eccentricity of 0.23 and an inclination of 2° with respect to the ecliptic. The body's observation arc begins at with its official discovery observation at Uccle in 1932.

== Physical characteristics ==
The asteroid's spectral type has not been determined, but its low albedo (see below) is typical for that of a carbonaceous C-type asteroid.

=== Diameter and albedo ===
According to the surveys carried out by the Infrared Astronomical Satellite IRAS and the NEOWISE mission of NASA's Wide-field Infrared Survey Explorer, Queteleta measures 15.94 and 18.032 kilometers in diameter and its surface has an albedo of 0.0695 and 0.051, respectively.

=== Rotation period, poles and shape ===
As of 2018, no rotational lightcurve of Queteleta has been obtained from photometric observations. The asteroid's rotation period, shape and poles remain unknown.

== Naming ==
This minor planet was named after Belgian astronomer and mathematician Adolphe Quetelet (1796–1874), whose research also encompassed several other scientific disciplines such as statistics, demography, sociology, criminology and the history of science. The official naming citation was mentioned in The Names of the Minor Planets by Paul Herget in 1955 (H 114). He was also honored by the lunar crater Quetelet.
