= Gadomski (surname) =

Gadomski (feminine: Gadomska, plural: Gadomscy) is a Polish surname. It may refer to:

- Jan Gadomski (1889–1966), Polish astronomer
- Stanisław Kostka Gadomski (1718–1797), Polish noble and military leader
- Witold Gadomski (born 1967), Polish fencer
