= Daniel Klute =

American rocket scientist and chemical engineer

Daniel O'Donnell Klute (1921–1964) was an American rocket scientist and chemical engineer.

During World War II, Klute worked for Chrysler developing the first American jet-powered fighter planes. Later, he was recruited to work on the Manhattan Project and the development of the first atomic bomb in Oak Ridge, Tennessee.

== Career ==
During the early 1960s, Klute was in charge of the combustion research at Rocketdyne Corporation during the development of the Saturn F-1 rocket engine. Testing of the engine had revealed a serious instability problem during combustion that would sometimes cause catastrophic failure. In October, 1962, Dr. Klute presided over the Combustion Stability Committee at the Liquid Propulsion Division at Rocketdyne. His contributions were instrumental in solving the combustion instability problem.

Dr. Klute's experience at Rocketdyne included analyses and analytical design studies for nearly all Rocketdyne engines, both liquid and solid. He was responsible for structural analysis and integrity of many Rocketdyne engines and their components. His analyses of control systems resulted in the advancement in the design of Rocketdyne products.

== Later life ==
In the last four years of his life, he had been associated with the combustion devices and combustion processes of the liquid rocket engines. He was especially influential in the design and development of the J-2 and F-1 combustion components.

From October 1962 until his death, he had been responsible for the direction of the F-1 stability program. In this capacity he gained national recognition and prominence as one of the nation's outstanding scientists. During this assignment, he worked closely with government specialists, university professors, and consultants regarding the fundamentals of combustion stability. He was recognized by NASA as an individual who made outstanding contributions to this field.

== Personal life ==
In 1945, Klute married Frances Kramer in Detroit, Michigan. Kramer worked testing aircraft engines in the Chrysler Factory. Together, they had nine children; Michael, Mary, Daniel, David, Margaret, Martha, Elizabeth, Steven, and Helen.

== Honors and awards ==
The crater Klute on the Moon was named after him in 1970 by the International Astronomical Union.
