= Adam Prazmowski =

Polish astronomer and astrophysicist

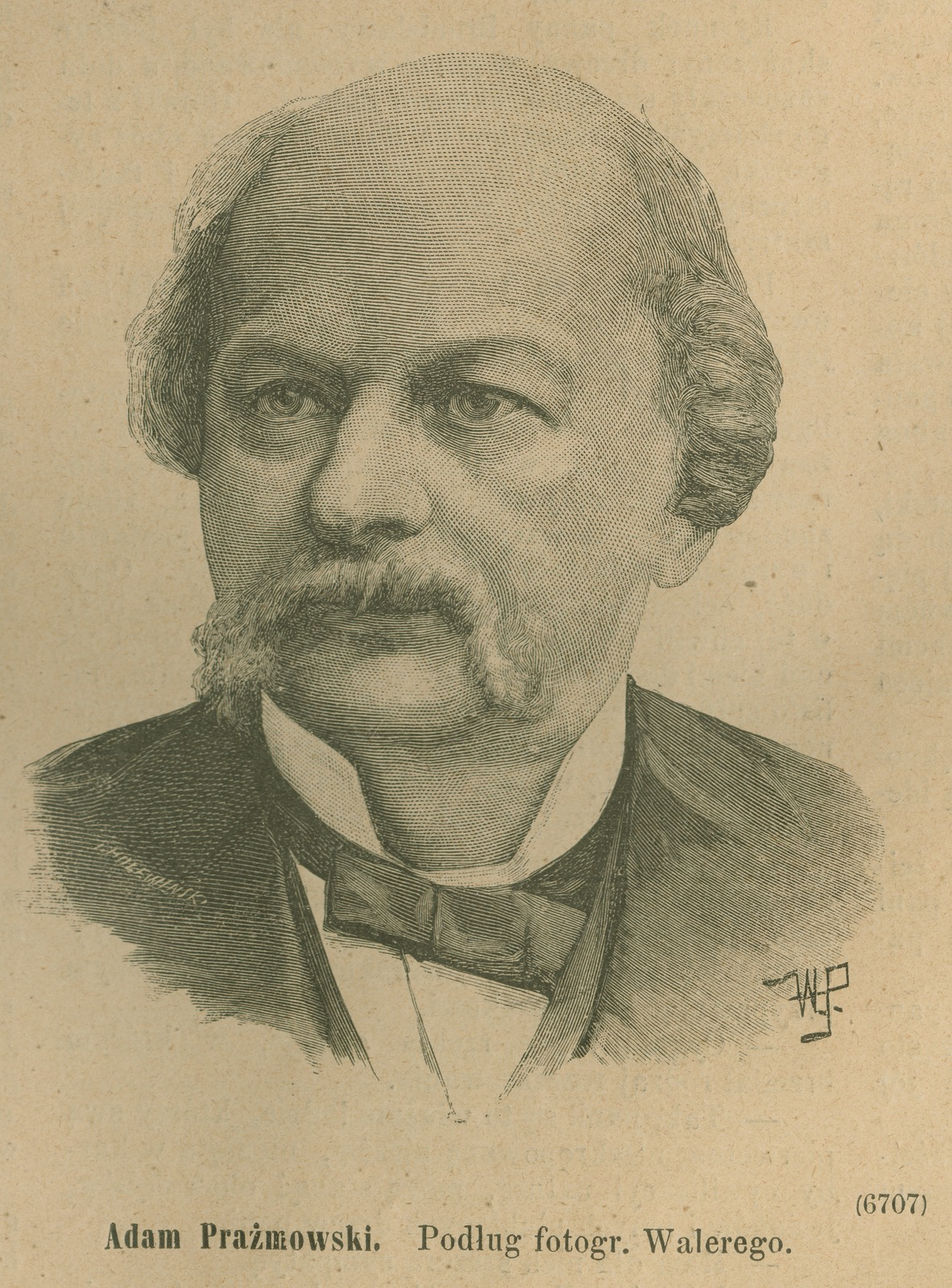
Adam Prazmowski.

Adam Józef Ignacy Prażmowski (1821–1885) was a Polish astronomer and astrophysicist of the 19th century. He worked in 1839 to 1850 at the Warsaw Observatory. Among his many discoveries, he discovered the polarized emissions from the Sun's corona in 1860.
