= Fowler (crater) =

Lunar impact crater

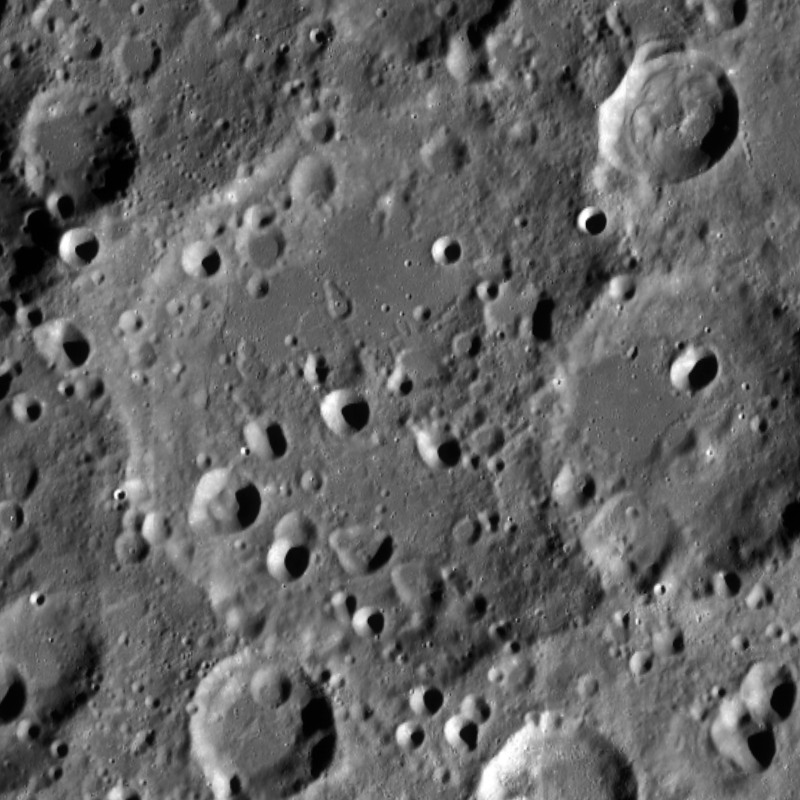
- LRO image of Fowler with Von Zeipel at right
- Coordinates: 42.59°N 145.27°W
- Diameter: 139.52 km (86.69 mi)
- Depth: Unknown
- Colongitude: 212° at sunrise
- Formation: Pre-Nectarian
- Eponym: Alfred Fowler; Ralph H. Fowler

Fowler is a large lunar impact crater that lies in the northern hemisphere on the Moon's far side. It lies to the south-southwest of the crater Esnault-Pelterie, and north of Gadomski. Overlying the eastern rim and intruding into the interior is Von Zeipel. Much of the surrounding highlands appears to consist of anorthosite with low iron content.

This crater is dated to the Pre-Nectarian period on the lunar geologic timescale. The outer rim has become worn and rounded by impact erosion until it has become little more than an irregular slope down to the interior depression. The infrared spectrum of pure crystalline plagioclase has been identified around the rim.

A number of small craters lie along the rim and the inner wall. An impact along the northeast rim, just north of Von Zeipel, has a relatively high albedo and is surrounded by a skirt of bright material. This is indicative of a relatively recent impact that has not had time to darken due to space weathering. The eastern part of the interior floor is partly overlaid by the outer rampart and ejecta from Von Zeipel. The southern floor is marked by an arc of small impacts. The northern floor is more level and is marked only by a few small craterlets. The crater includes a 9-km long lobate scarp.

This formation is named after British astronomer Alfred Fowler (1868-1940) and British mathematician and physicist Ralph H. Fowler (1889-1944). Prior to its designation being formally adopted by the International Astronomical Union in 1970, Fowler was called Crater 83. A crater to the west of Fowler that is currently unnamed was called Crater 81.

== Satellite craters ==
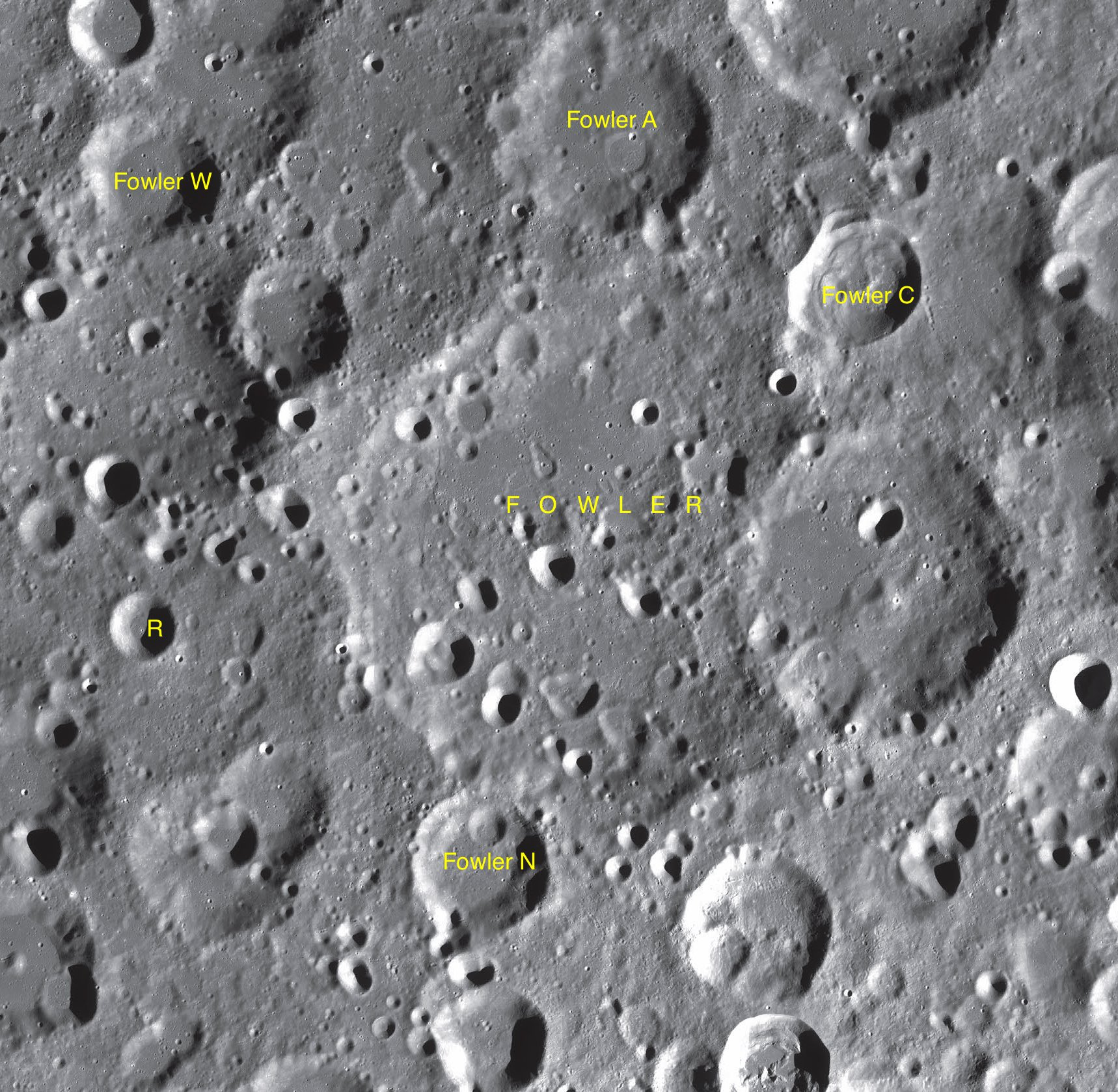
Satellite features and surroundings

By convention, these features are identified on lunar maps by placing the letter on the side of the crater midpoint that is closest to Fowler.

Fowler	Latitude	Longitude	Diameter
A	46.3° N	145.0° W	52 km
C	45.0° N	141.9° W	32 km
N	40.1° N	146.1° W	39 km
R	42.2° N	150.1° W	18 km
W	46.0° N	150.2° W	31 km
