= Von Zeipel (crater) =

Crater on the Moon

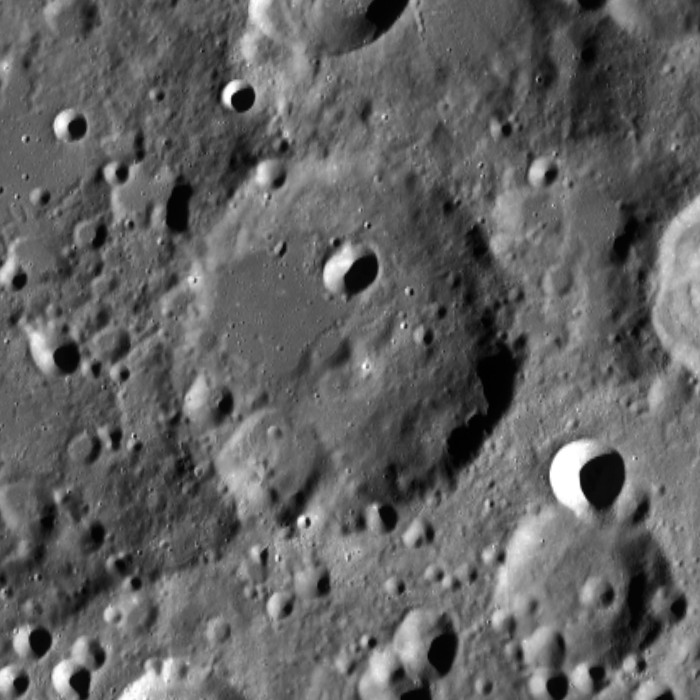
- LRO image
- Coordinates: 42.19°N 141.93°W
- Diameter: 83.41 km (51.83 mi)
- Depth: Unknown
- Colongitude: 143° at sunrise
- Eponym: Edvard H. von Zeipel

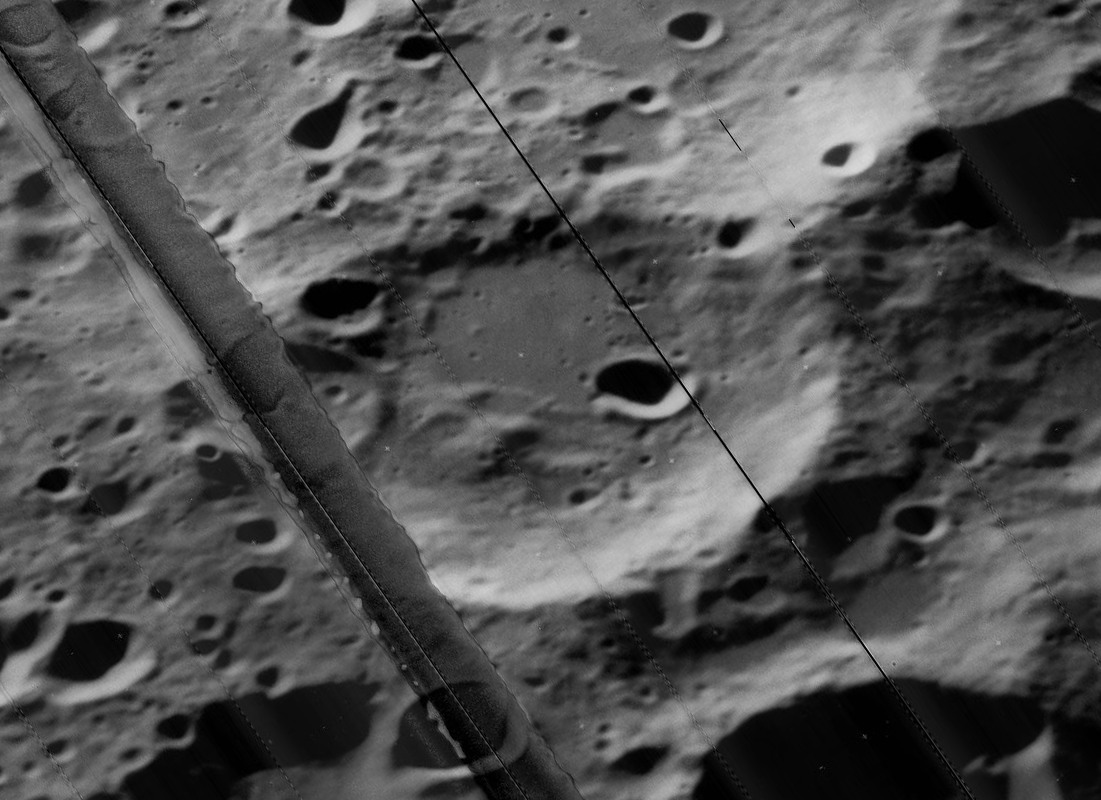
Oblique Lunar Orbiter 5 image (band crossing image is artifact of original)

Von Zeipel is a lunar impact crater on the Moon's far side. It partly overlies the eastern rim of the larger crater Fowler, and intrudes into the interior floor. To the north of Von Zeipel is the crater Esnault-Pelterie, and due south lies Klute.

This is an eroded crater formation, particularly along the western and southwestern sides. The remaining rim is worn and rounded from smaller impacts, although the perimeter can still be clearly discerned. There is a small, worn crater laid across the south-southwestern rim and a cup-shaped crater located prominently in the northern half of the interior floor.

Prior to formal naming by the IAU in 1970, Von Zeipel was called Crater 86.

== Satellite craters ==
By convention these features are identified on lunar maps by placing the letter on the side of the crater midpoint that is closest to Von Zeipel.

Von Zeipel	Latitude	Longitude	Diameter
J	40.8° N	139.3° W	39 km
