= Gadomski (crater) =

Lunar Crater

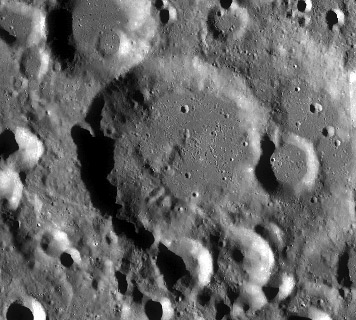
- LRO image
- Coordinates: 36.4°N 147.3°W
- Diameter: 65.66 km (40.80 mi)
- Depth: Unknown
- Colongitude: 148° at sunrise
- Formation: Pre-Nectarian
- Eponym: Jan Gadomski

Gadomski is a lunar crater on the far side of the Moon. It is located to the south of the much larger crater Fowler, and to the west of Klute.

This crater dates to the Pre-Nectarian period on the lunar geologic timescale. Like many such features on the Moon, has an eroded outer rim that has been modified by subsequent impacts. A merged pair of craters is attached to the exterior of the southern rim, and satellite crater Gadomski X is attached along the north-northwest. A small crater also intrudes slightly into the eastern flank. Gadomski in turn overlies the western portion of a still larger, and unnamed crater feature that is even more heavily eroded. The rim is roughly circular, but is slightly distended toward the southwest. The interior floor is relatively featureless, with a few tiny craterlets marking the surface.

The crater was named after Polish astronomer Jan Gadomski (1889–1966). Its designation was formally adopted by the International Astronomical Union in 1970.

== Satellite craters ==
By convention these features are identified on lunar maps by placing the letter on the side of the crater midpoint that is closest to Gadomski.

Gadomski	Latitude	Longitude	Diameter
A	38.6° N	145.9° W	32 km
X	37.8° N	148.3° W	35 km
