= Jan Gadomski =

Polish astronomer

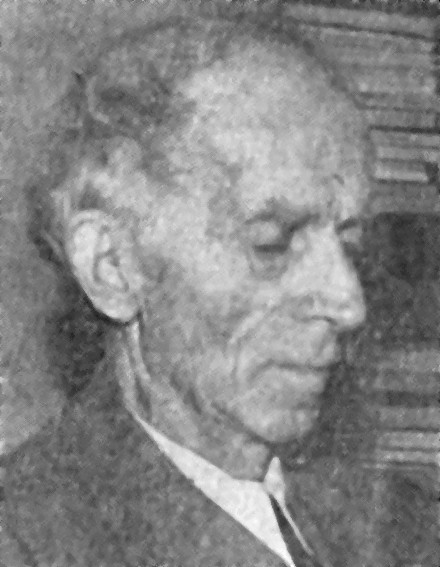
- Born: 24 June 1889; Czatkowice, Lesser Poland Voivodeship, Russian Poland
- Died: 2 January 1966 (aged 76)
- Occupation: Astronomer

Jan Gadomski (24 June 1889, in Czatkowice, Lesser Poland Voivodeship, Russian Poland – 2 January 1966) was a Polish astronomer.

At the Jagiellonian University Observatory he made systematic observations of eclipsing binary stars. The crater Gadomski on the Moon is named after him.
