= Faye (crater) =

Lunar impact crater

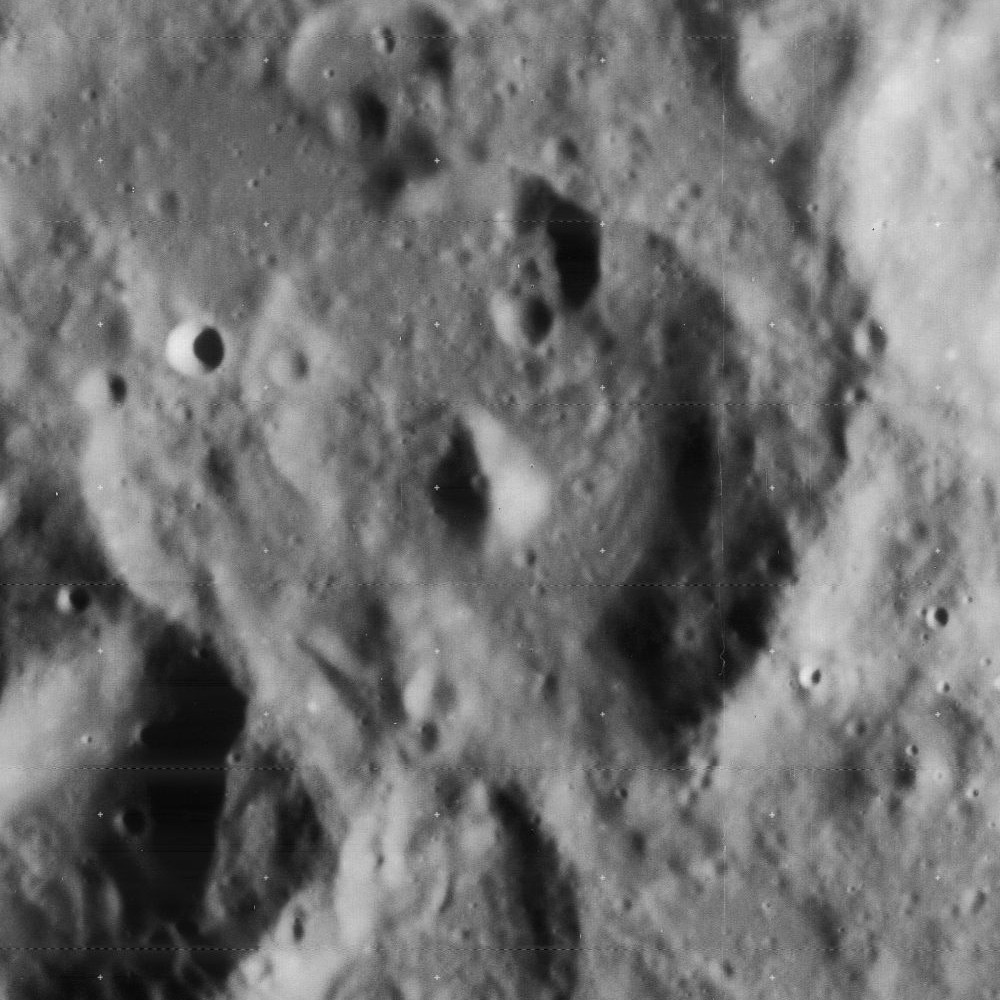
- Lunar Orbiter 4 image
- Coordinates: 21.4°S 3.9°E
- Diameter: 36 km (22 mi)
- Depth: 2.4 km (1.5 mi)
- Colongitude: 357° at sunrise
- Eponym: Hervé Faye

Faye is a heavily degraded lunar impact crater in the rugged southern highlands of the Moon. It is attached to the northeastern rim of the crater Delaunay, with Donati located just a few kilometers to the northeast. It forms part of a chain of craters of increasing size to the southwest that continues with La Caille and ends with Purbach, a walled plain.

The rim of Faye is heavily damaged, particularly along the western half and deposits cover much of the southwestern interior floor. The rim is nearly non-existent in the northwest, where a gap joins the interior with the surrounding terrain. The surviving interior floor is relatively featureless, with a central peak rising at the midpoint. There is a small craterlet and the incised remnant of a small crater rim in the northeast part of the floor.

This formation is named after French astronomer Hervé Faye (1814-1902). His name was included with the lunar nomenclature of English amateur selenographer William R. Birt during the 19th century. Its designation was officially adopted by the International Astronomical Union in 1935.

== Satellite craters ==
By convention these features are identified on lunar maps by placing the letter on the side of the crater midpoint that is closest to Faye.

Faye	Latitude	Longitude	Diameter
A	21.2° S	3.1° E	4 km
B	22.6° S	4.5° E	4 km
