= Werner (crater) =

Crater on the Moon

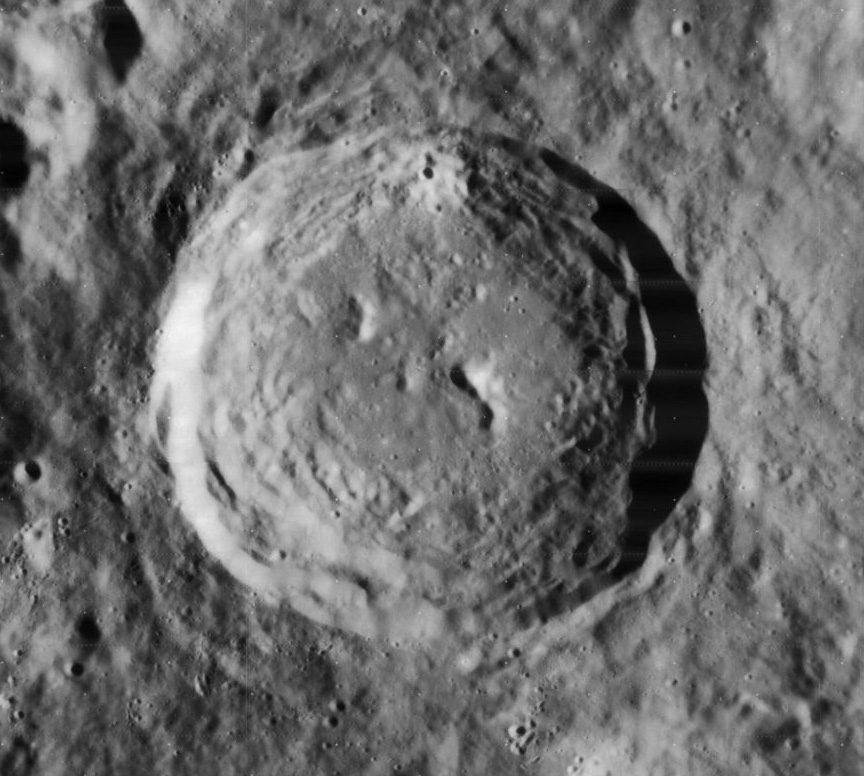
- Lunar Orbiter 4 image
- Coordinates: 28.0°S 3.3°E
- Diameter: 70 km
- Depth: 4.2 km
- Colongitude: 357° at sunrise
- Formation: Eratosthenian
- Eponym: Johannes Werner

Werner is a prominent lunar impact crater that lies in the rugged south-central highlands of the Moon. British astronomer T. W. Webb called this "one of the loftiest rings" on the visible Moon. It was named after the 15th-century German mathematician and astronomer Johannes Werner. It is almost joined with the crater Aliacensis to the southeast, and the pair form a rugged valley in the intervening gap. Due west of Werner is the distorted Regiomontanus, and to the north is the remains of Blanchinus.

On the lunar geologic timescale, this crater is from the Eratosthenian period, which lasted from 3.2 to 1.1 billion years ago. The rim of Werner shows little appearance of wear, and is much younger and less eroded than the other large craters in the surroundings. The interior wall is terraced, and there is a noticeable rampart on the exterior. There are several low rises on the crater floor and a notable central peak. Its highly terraced walls attain peaks of almost 1,500 feet. The crater is 45 miles (70 kilometers) in diameter, and the difference in height between its rim and its deepest parts is 4.2 kilometers.

Near the Werner crater, a chiaroscuro effect created by the dark craters and their lit rims is visible for several hours before first quarter forms an X.

== Werner during full moon ==
The bright ray system of Tycho, overlapping almost all craters in its neighbourhood, makes it difficult to find and to observe crater Werner. A small bright starlike dot on the northern part of Werner's rim, satellite craterlet Werner D, is a guide for telescopic observers of the full moon to get to the region of Werner itself. The starlike brightness of satellite crater Werner D is also noticeable on the photographic version of chart LAC 95 (page 190) in The Clementine Atlas of the Moon (Ben Bussey / Paul D. Spudis).

== Satellite craters ==
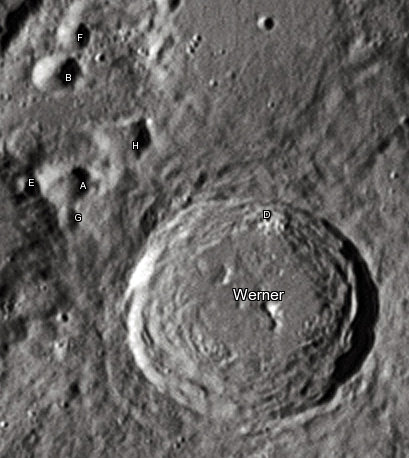
Satellite craters of Werner

By convention these features are identified on lunar maps by placing the letter on the side of the crater midpoint that is closest to Werner.

Werner	Latitude	Longitude	Diameter
A	27.2° S	1.1° E	15 km
B	26.2° S	0.7° E	13 km
D	27.1° S	3.2° E	2 km
E	27.4° S	0.8° E	7 km
F	25.8° S	0.8° E	10 km
G	27.6° S	1.3° E	9 km
H	26.6° S	1.5° E	16 km
