= Aliacensis (crater) =

Crater on the Moon

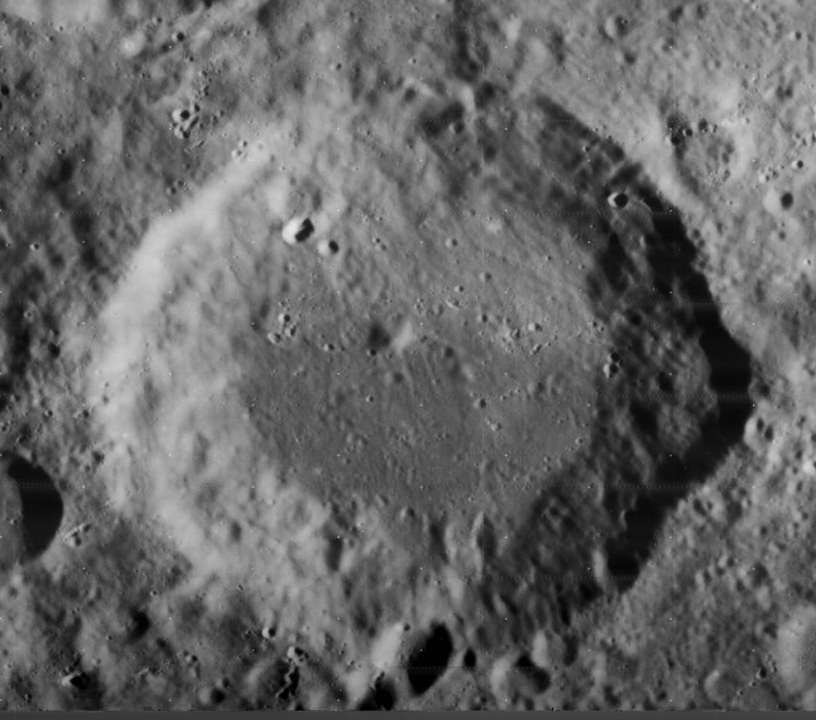
- Lunar Orbiter 4 image
- Coordinates: 30.60°S 5.13°E
- Diameter: 79.65 km
- Depth: 3.7 km
- Colongitude: 356° at sunrise
- Formation: Nectarian
- Eponym: Pierre d'Ailly

Aliacensis is a lunar impact crater that is located in the rugged southern highlands of the Moon. The crater Werner is located just to its north-northwest, and a narrow, rugged valley lies between the two comparably sized formations. To the southwest is Walther, and Apianus is to the northeast. South of it lie two somewhat broken rings, Kaiser and Nonius.

This crater dates from the Nectarian period, which lasted from 3.92 to 3.85 billion years ago. Ejecta from the younger Werner crater overlays the northern wall. The rim of Aliacensis is generally circular, with an outward bulge on the eastern wall. The inner wall has some slight terracing particularly in the northeast. There is a small crater located across the southern rim. The interior floor is generally flat, with a low central peak slightly offset to the northwest of the midpoint. It is 80 kilometers in diameter and there is a 3.7 kilometer difference in height between its deepest part and its rim.

Aliacensis was named after the 14th century French geographer and theologian Pierre d'Ailly (1350-1420). Its designation was formally adopted by the International Astronomical Union in 1935. The name was introduced into lunar nomenclature by Italian astronomer G. B. Ricciolli in 1651.

== Satellite craters ==
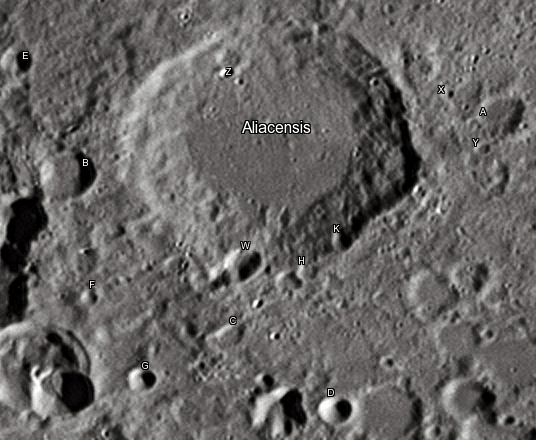
Aliacensis with satellite craters labeled

By convention these features are identified on lunar maps by placing the letter on the side of the crater midpoint that is closest to Aliacensis.

Aliacensis	Latitude	Longitude	Diameter
A	29.7° S	7.4° E	14 km
B	31.3° S	3.2° E	16 km
C	32.6° S	5.4° E	8 km
D	33.1° S	6.9° E	10 km
E	30.4° S	2.3° E	9 km
F	32.7° S	3.9° E	5 km
G	33.3° S	4.7° E	8 km
H	31.8° S	6.1° E	6 km
K	31.4° S	6.2° E	7 km
W	31.9° S	5.3° E	11 km
X	29.6° S	6.9° E	4 km
Y	30.1° S	7.4° E	5 km
Z	30.0° S	4.6° E	4 km
