= Purbach =

Purbach may refer to:

- Purbach am Neusiedlersee — a town in Burgenland, Austria
- Purbach (crater), a large lunar crater
- Georg Purbach — 15-century Austrian astronomer and mathematician
