= Blanchinus (crater) =

Crater on the Moon

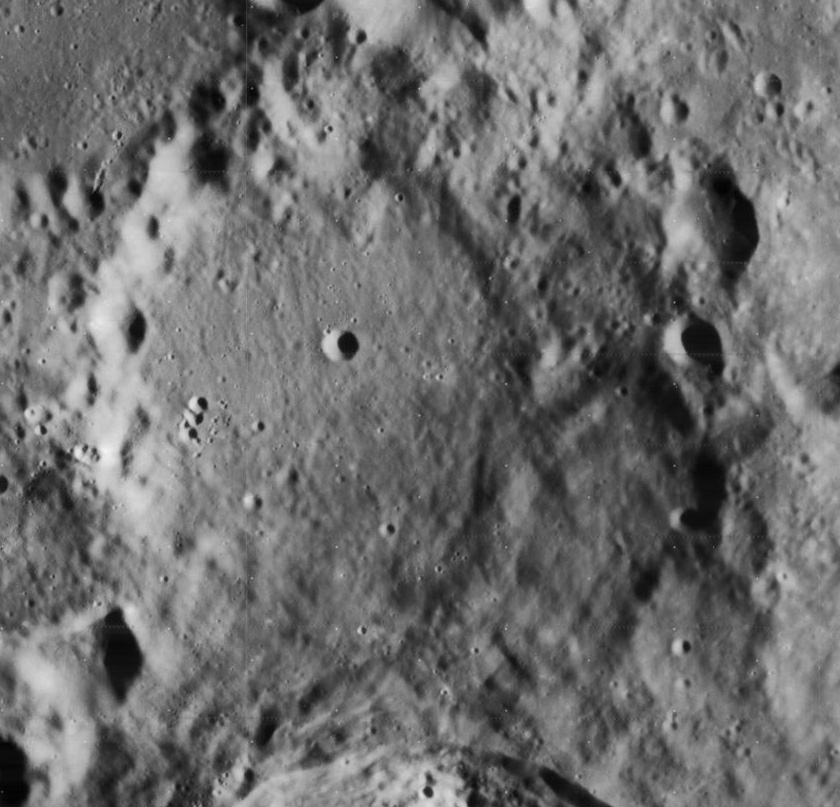
- Lunar Orbiter 4 image
- Coordinates: 25.4°S 2.5°E
- Diameter: 59.90 km (37.22 mi)
- Depth: 1.16 km (0.72 mi)
- Colongitude: 358° at sunrise
- Formation: Pre-Nectarian
- Eponym: Giovanni Bianchini

Blanchinus is a worn lunar impact crater in the rugged south-central highlands of the Moon. Adjacent to its south is the crater Werner, and La Caille is attached to the northwest rim. To its west is the prominent formation Purbach. For a few hours before the first quarter, the crater's rim contributes the lunar x visual phenomenon.

On the lunar geologic timescale, this crater dates to the Pre-Nectarian epoch. Blanchinus' outer rim has been significantly degraded by subsequent impacts, leaving an irregular, notched exterior ring of rugged hills and ridges. The inner floor, in contrast, is nearly flat and free of significant impacts. Only a few tiny craterlets mark it, with Blanchinus M near the midpoint and the remainder near the southwest rim.

This crater is named after Italian astronomer Giovanni Bianchini (unkn-fl. 1458), whose Latinized name is Blanchinus. The name was incorporated into lunar nomenclature by German astronomer J. H. Schröter in 1791. The crater designation was formally adopted by the International Astronomical Union in 1935.

== Satellite craters ==
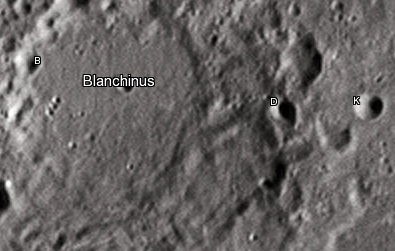
Blanchinus crater and its satellite craters taken from Earth in 2012 at the University of Hertfordshire's Bayfordbury Observatory with the telescopes Meade LX200 14" and Lumenera Skynyx 2-1

By convention these features are identified on lunar maps by placing the letter on the side of the crater midpoint that is closest to Blanchinus.

Blanchinus	Latitude	Longitude	Diameter
B	25.2° S	1.6° E	8 km
D	25.0° S	4.2° E	7 km
K	24.8° S	5.1° E	9 km
M	25.2° S	2.6° E	5 km
