= Fernelius (crater) =

Crater on the Moon

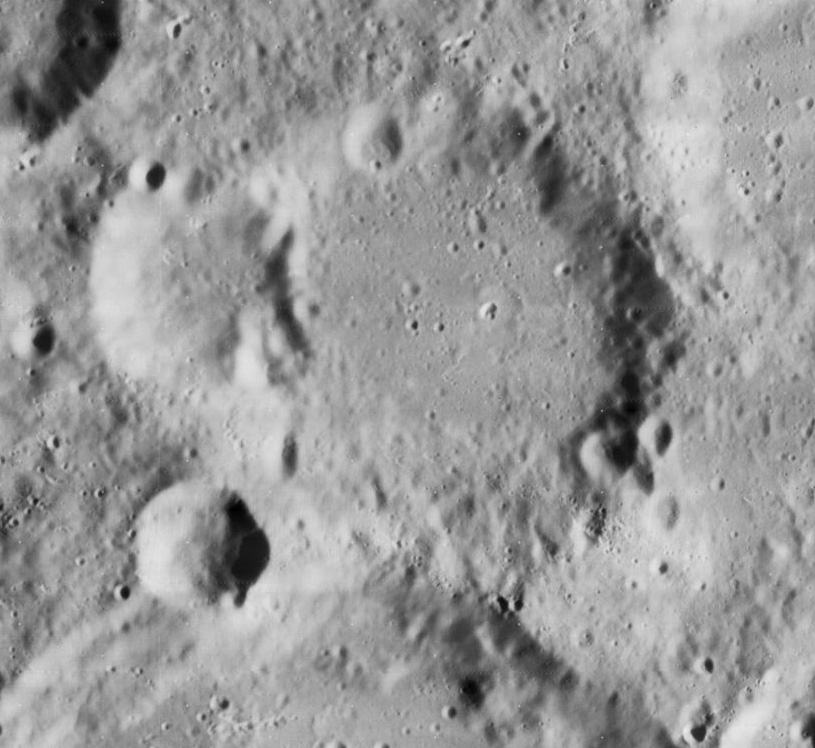
- Lunar Orbiter 4 image
- Coordinates: 38.1°S 4.9°E
- Diameter: 68.42 km (42.51 mi)
- Depth: 1.8 km (1.1 mi)
- Colongitude: 356° at sunrise
- Eponym: Jean Fernel

Fernelius is a lunar impact crater located in the southern highlands of the Moon, just to the north of the walled plain designated Stöfler. The crater Kaiser is located next to the northwest rim of Fernelius. To the north-northwest are the craters Nonius and Walther. Southeast of Fernelius is the crater cluster of Miller, Nasireddin, Huggins, and Orontius.

In the past the floor of Fernelius has been resurfaced, leaving a relatively flat, featureless interior with no central peaks. The mostly circular outer rim has been heavily degraded by impacts, the most prominent being Fernelius A which intrudes into the western rim.

This formation is named after 16th century French astronomer Jean Fernel (1497-1558). His name was incorporated with the lunar nomenclature of Italian astronomer Giovanni Riccioli in 1651, but was assigned to the crater now named Nonius. Its modern designation was officially adopted by the International Astronomical Union in 1935.

== Satellite craters ==
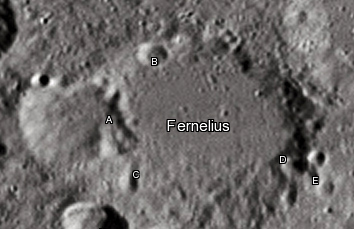
Fernelius and its satellite craters

By convention these features are identified on lunar maps by placing the letter on the side of the crater midpoint that is closest to Fernelius.

Fernelius	Latitude	Longitude	Diameter
A	38.3° S	3.5° E	30 km
B	37.4° S	4.1° E	10 km
C	38.9° S	4.4° E	7 km
D	38.2° S	6.2° E	7 km
E	38.3° S	6.6° E	6 km
