= Jean Fernel =

16th-century French physician

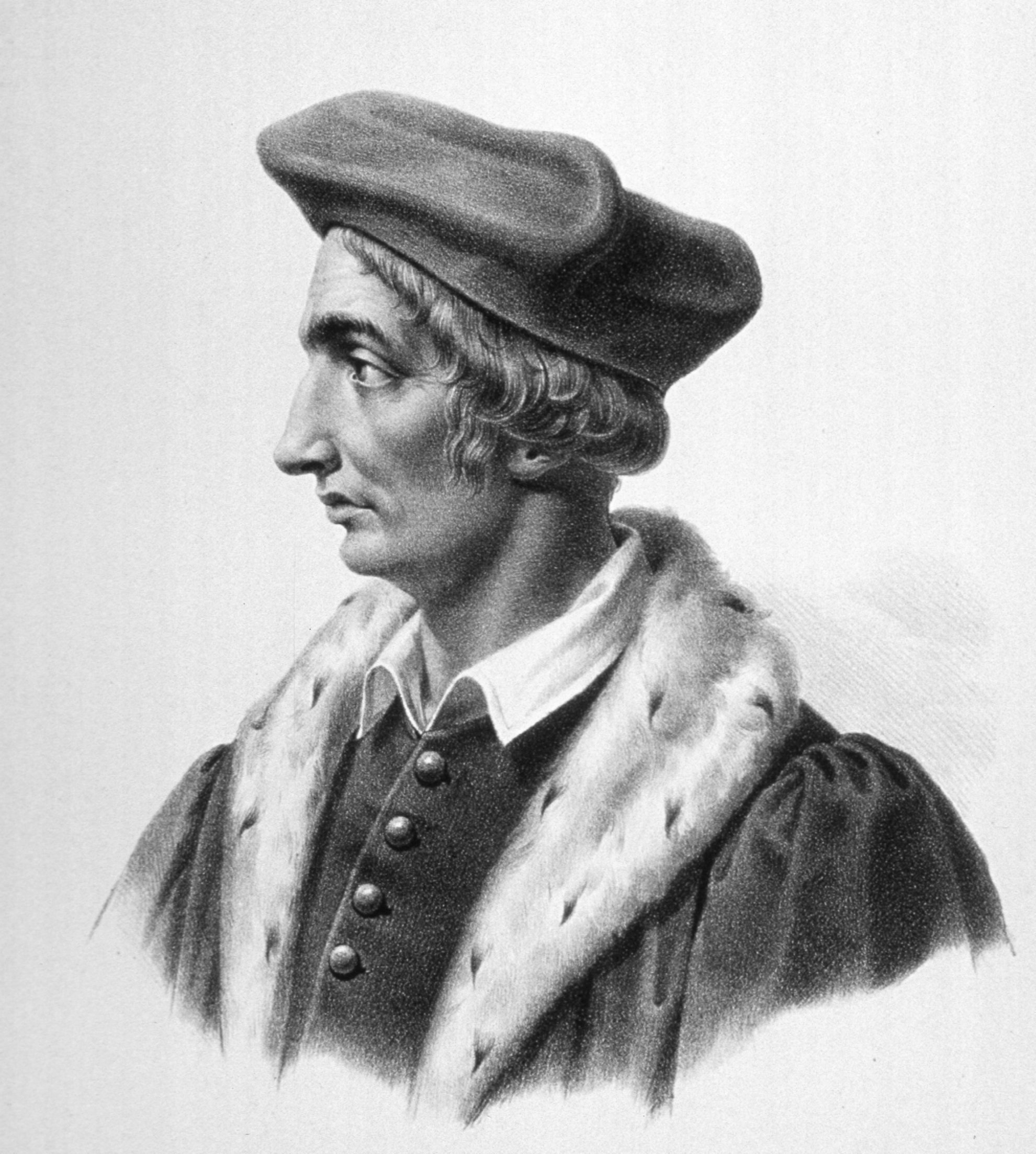
- Born: 1497; Montdidier
- Died: 26 April 1558 (aged 60–61); Fontainebleau
- Other name: Ioannes Fernelius

Academic background
- Influences: Galen

Academic work
- Discipline: Medicine
- Institutions: University of Paris
- Notable students: Andreas Vesalius

Jean François Fernel (Latinized as Ioannes Fernelius; 1497 – 26 April 1558) was a French physician who introduced the term "physiology" to describe the study of the body's function. He was the first person to describe the spinal canal. The lunar crater Fernelius is named after him.

Fernel suggested that taste buds are sensitive to fat, an idea which research in the early 21st century proved to be correct.

== Life ==
He was born in Montdidier and, after receiving his early education at Clermont, he entered the College of Sainte-Barbe, Paris. At first he devoted himself to mathematical and astronomical studies; but from 1534 he gave himself up entirely to medicine, in which he graduated in 1530. His general erudition, and the skill and success with which he sought to revive the study of the old Greek physicians, gained him a reputation, and ultimately the office of physician to the court. Catherine de' Medici, wife of King Henry II of France, sought his advice regarding their difficulty in conceiving a child. He practiced with success, and at his death at Paris in 1558 left him a large fortune. His remains were entombed at the Church of Saint-Jacques-de-la-Boucherie.

== Work ==
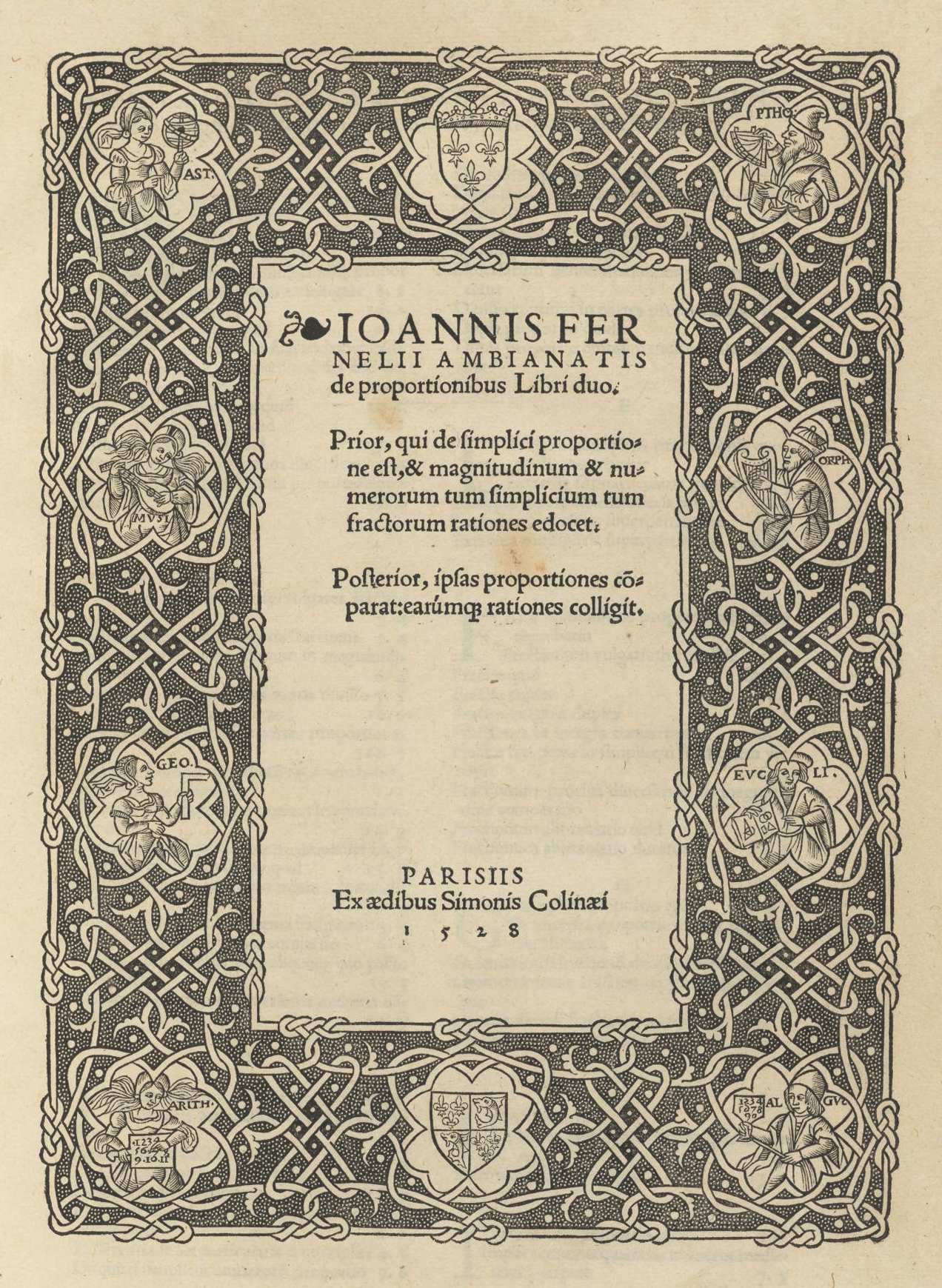
De proportionibus libri duo (1528)

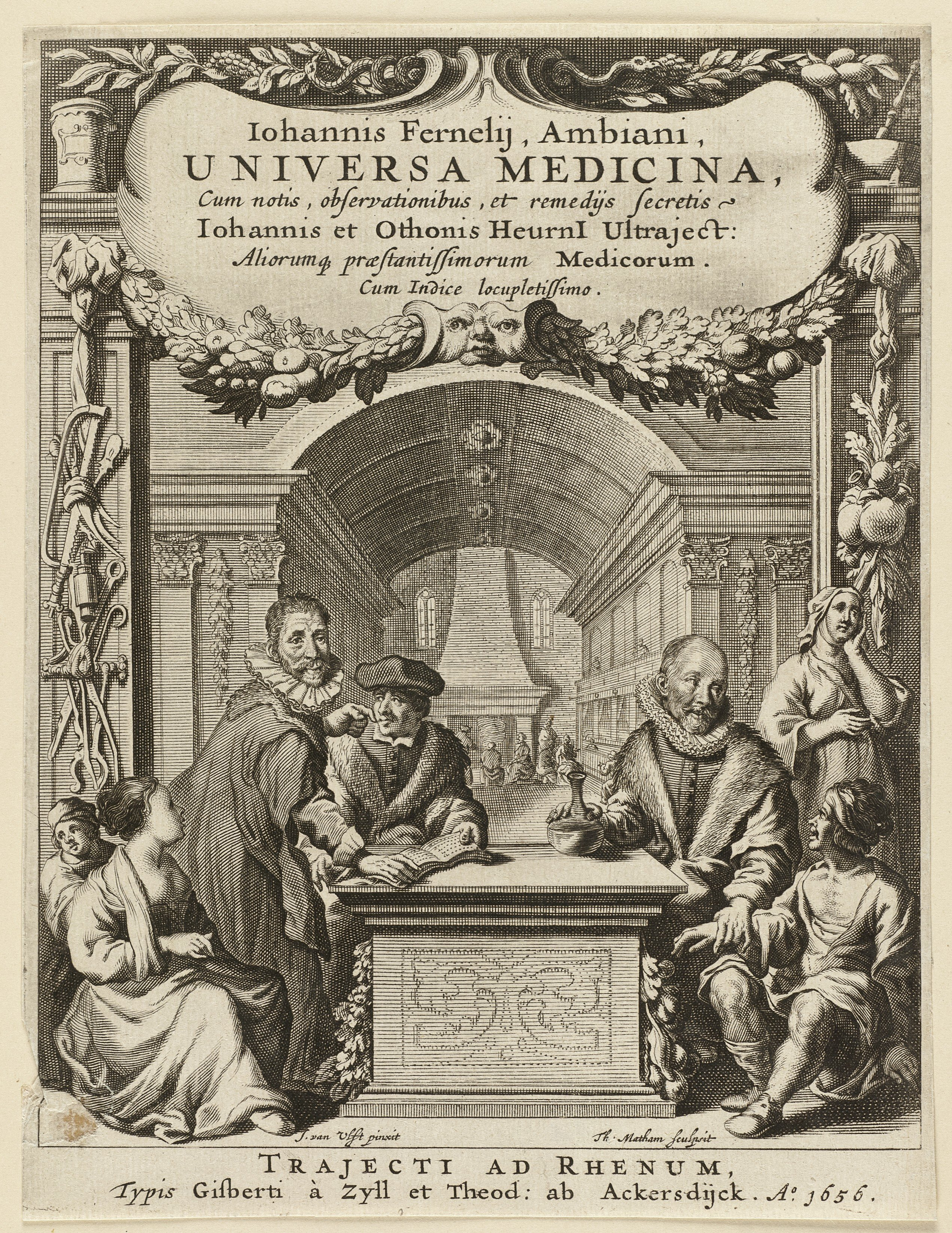
Jean Fernel. Universa medicina. Utrecht: Gijsbert van Zijll en Dirck van Ackersdijck, 1656.

=== Astronomy and geodesy ===
Fernel's Cosmotheoria (1528) records a determination (arc measurement) of a degree of arc of the meridian, which he made by counting the revolutions of his carriage wheels on a journey between Paris and Amiens. Using his measurements he calculated the circumference of the earth to within one percent of the correct value. He computated a degree of a meridian would have been long 56,746 toises instead of the 57,024 that were subsequently measured. His works on mathematical and astronomical subjects also include Monalosphaerium, sive astrolabii genus, generalis horarii structura et usus (1526), and De proportionibus (1528).

=== Physiology ===
As a physician and professor of medicine at the Collège de Coenouailles for over 20 years, Fernel is credited with the neologism, physiology, a discipline which became one of the central topics of education and research in the field of medicine. His early understanding of physiology, especially of the brain, was represented by three statements commonly quoted in physiological history:

- "Anatomy is to physiology as geography is to history; it describes the theatre of events."
- The brain was "the seat of the mind and its parts; the mind being endowed with numerous faculties, man has rightly been provided with a larger accommodation for it than the other creature possess, and this accommodation is associated with more instruments."
- "The brain is the citadel and dwelling of the human mind, the abode of thoughts and of the reason, the wellspring and origin of movement and of every sense; it occupies the highest point of the body, looking upwards, nearest to heaven."

His medical works included De naturali parte medicinae (1542), De vacuandi ratione (1545), De abditis rerum causis (1548) which included a chapter on angelology and demonology. What has been called his "crowning work", Universa Medicina, comprises three parts: the Physiologia (developed from the De naturali parte), the Pathologia, and the Therapeutice.
