= Charles-Eugène Delaunay =

French astronomer and mathematician (1816–1872)

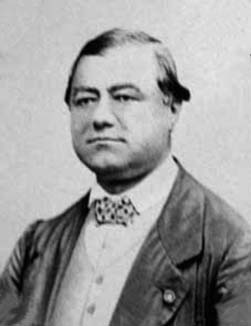
- Charles-Eugène Delaunay
- Born: 9 April 1816; Lusigny-sur-Barse, France
- Died: 5 August 1872 (aged 56); Cherbourg, France
- Resting place: Ramerupt
- Known for: Delaunay variables
- Scientific career
- Fields: Astronomy; Celestial mechanics
- Workplaces: Paris Observatory

Charles-Eugène Delaunay (French pronunciation: [ʃaʁl øʒɛn dəlonɛ]; 9 April 1816 – 5 August 1872) was a French astronomer and mathematician. His lunar motion studies were important in advancing both the theory of planetary motion and mathematics.

== Life ==
Born in Lusigny-sur-Barse, France, to Jacques-Hubert Delaunay and Catherine Choiselat, Delaunay studied under Jean-Baptiste Biot at the Sorbonne. He worked on the mechanics of the Moon as a special case of the three-body problem. He published two volumes on the topic, each of 900 pages in length, in 1860 and 1867. The work hints at chaos in the system, and clearly demonstrates the problem of so-called "small denominators" in perturbation theory. His infinite series expression for finding the position of the Moon converged too slowly to be of practical use but was a catalyst in the development of functional analysis and computer algebra.

Delaunay maintained a home in Ramerupt, the ancestral home of his wife's family. He would frequent the commune each summer.

Delaunay became director of the Paris Observatory in 1870 but drowned in a boating accident near Cherbourg, France, two years later. He was followed by Jean Claude Bouquet at the Academy. Peter Guthrie Tait in his book An Elementary Treatise on Quaternions edition 1867 on page 244 named Didonia in honour of Delaunay.

Delaunay was buried in Ramerupt.

== Honours ==
- Member of the Académie des Sciences, (1855)
- Gold Medal of the Royal Astronomical Society, (1870)
- His name is one of the 72 names inscribed on the Eiffel Tower.
- Delaunay crater on the Moon is named after him.

== Bibliography ==
=== By Delaunay ===
- Delaunay, C.-E. (1874) [1850]. Cours élémentaire de mécanique (8th ed.).
- Delaunay, C.-E. (1870) [1853]. Cours élémentaire d'astronomie (5th ed.).
- Delaunay, C.-E. (1873) [1856]. Traité de mécanique rationnelle (4th ed.).
- Delaunay, C.-E. (1860). Théorie du mouvement de la lune. Vol. 1.
- Delaunay, C.-E. (1867). Théorie du mouvement de la lune. Vol. 2.
- Delaunay, C.-E. (1866). Ralentissement de la rotation de la terre.
- Delaunay, C.-E. (1867). Rapport sur les progrès de l'astronomie.
- Some of Delaunay's works are digitalized on Paris Observatory digital library.
