= Hervé Faye =

French astronomer (1814–1902)

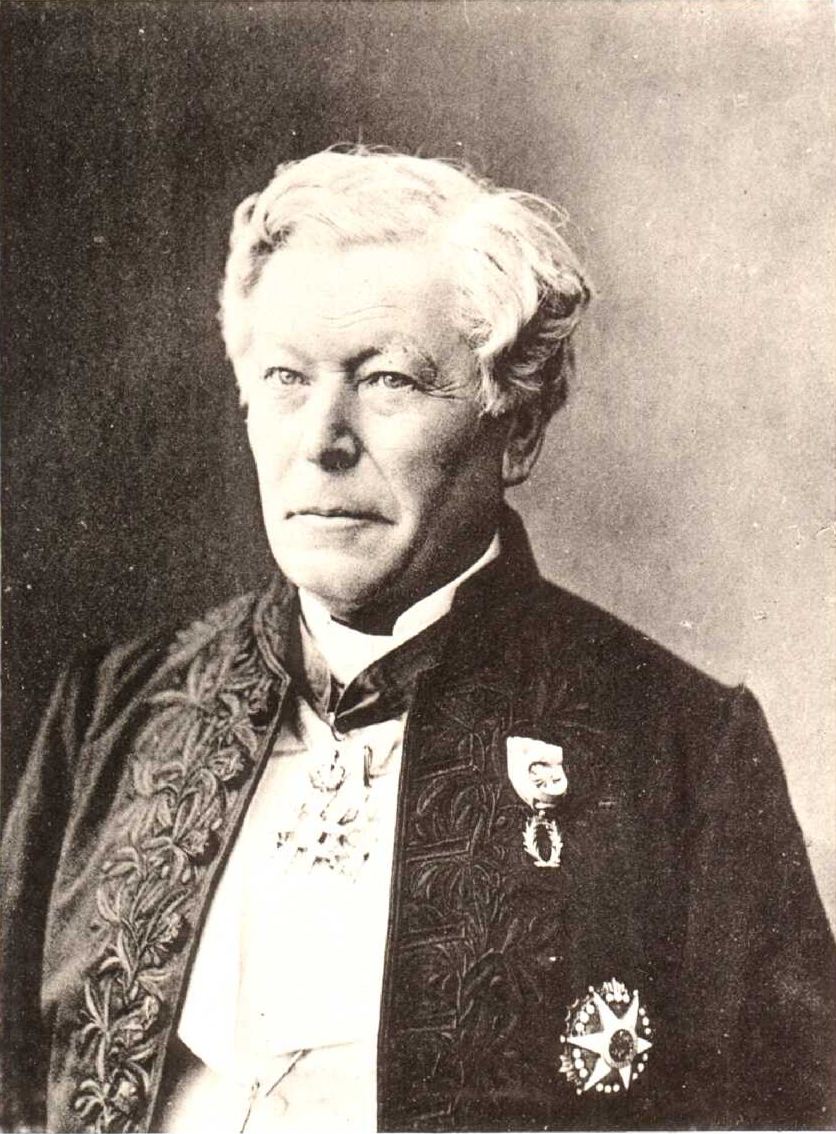
- Born: 1 October 1814; Saint-Benoît-du-Sault, Indre, France
- Died: 4 July 1902 (aged 87)
- Education: École Polytechnique
- Known for: Discovery of Faye's Comet
- Awards: Lalande Prize, member of the French Academy of Sciences, President of the Société Astronomique de France
- Scientific career
- Fields: Astronomy
- Workplaces: Paris Observatory, École Polytechnique

Signature
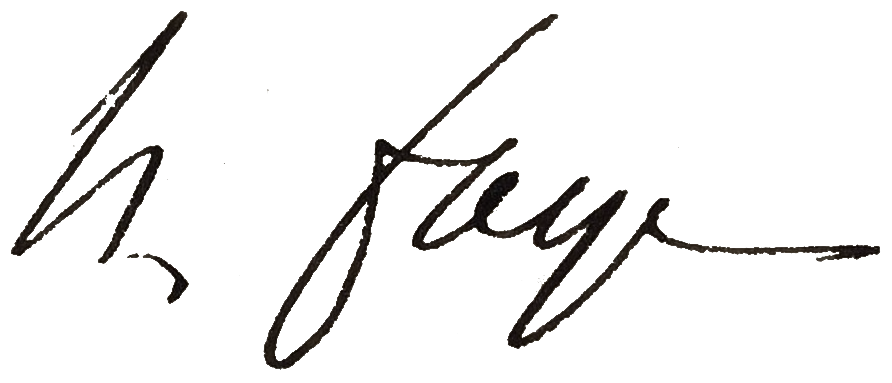

Hervé Auguste Étienne Albans Faye (1 October 1814 – 4 July 1902) was a French astronomer, born at Saint-Benoît-du-Sault (Indre) and educated at the École Polytechnique, which he left in 1834, before completing his course, to accept a position in the Paris Observatory to which he had been appointed on the recommendation of M. Arago. It was during his time at the École Polytechnique that he developed his interest in astronomy.

He studied comets, and discovered the periodic comet 4P/Faye on 22 November 1843. His discovery of "Faye's Comet" attracted worldwide attention, and won him the 1844 Lalande Prize and a membership in the French Academy of Sciences. In 1848 he became an instructor in geodesy at the Polytechnique, and in 1854 rector of the academy at Nancy and professor of astronomy in the faculty of science there. Other promotions followed in succeeding decades. He became Minister of Public Instruction in the Rochebouet cabinet in 1877, a position which he held only briefly.

Faye served as the President of the Société Astronomique de France (SAF), the French astronomical society, from 1889 to 1891. He also served as president of the International Geodetic Association from 1892 to 1902.

His work covered the entire field of astronomical investigation. It comprised the determination of comet periods, the measurement of parallaxes, and the study of stellar and planetary movements. He also studied the physics of the sun. He advanced several original theories on the nature and form of comets, meteors, the aurora borealis, and the sun.

Faye crater on the Moon is named after him.

== Religious beliefs ==
In his work Sur l'origine du Monde, Faye quoted the beginning of Psalm 19, "Caeli enarrant gloriam Dei" ("The heavens declare the glory of God") and stated,

We run no risk of deceiving ourselves in considering it [Superior Intelligence] the author of all things, in referring to it those splendours of the heavens which aroused our thoughts: and finally we are ready to understand and accept the traditional formula: God, Father Almighty, Creator of heaven and earth.

== Publications ==
In collaboration with Charles Galusky he translated Humboldt's Cosmos (four volumes, 1846–59), and, in addition to numerous contributions to scientific periodicals, published the following important works:

- Sur les déclinaisons absolues (1850)
- Leçons de cosmographie (1852; second edition, 1854)
- Sur les cyclones solaires (1873)
- Cours d'astronomie de l'Ecole Polytechnique (two volumes, 1881–83)
- Sur l'origine du monde (1884; third edition, enlarged 1895)
- Nouvelle étude sur les tempêtes, cyclones, trombes, ou tornadoes (1897)
