= Giovanni Battista Donati =

Italian astronomer (1826–1873)

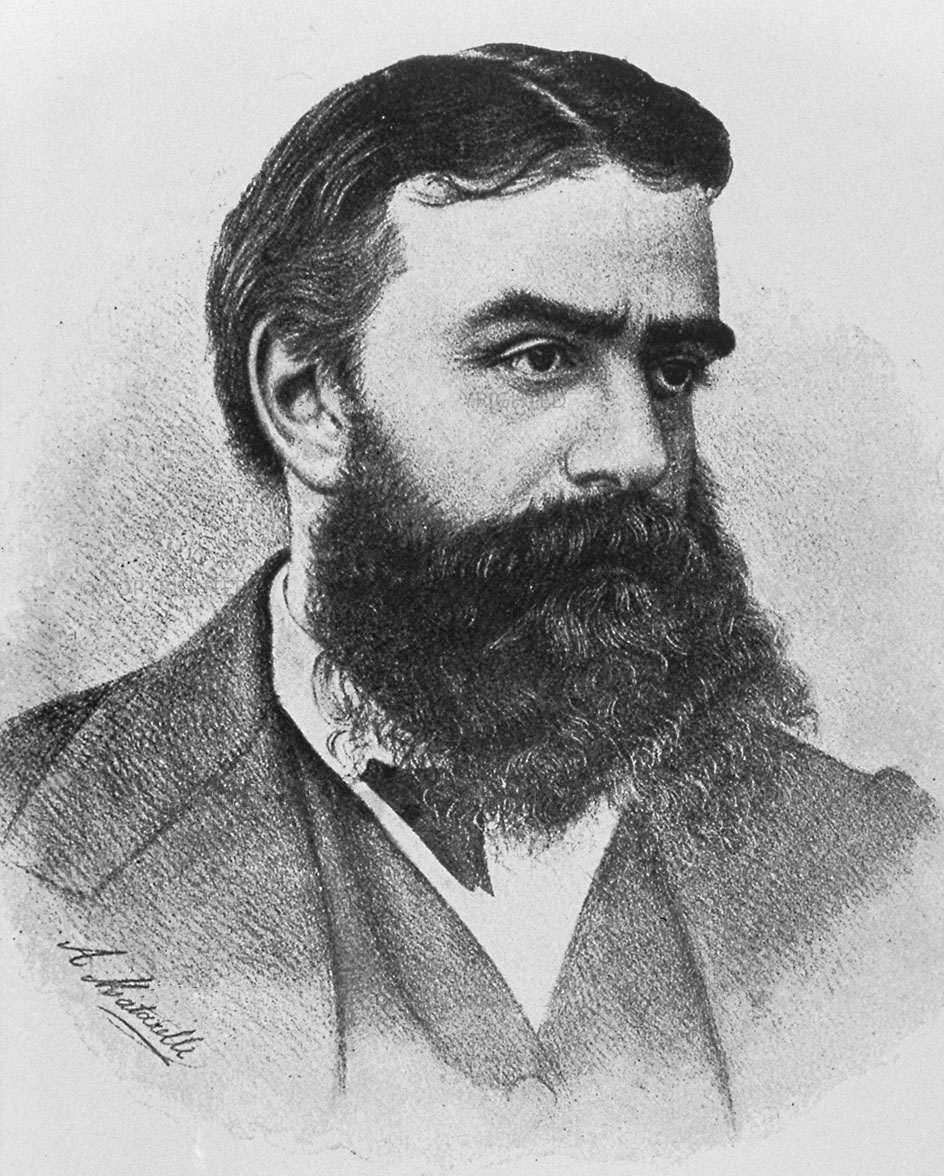
- Giovanni Battista Donati
- Born: 16 December 1826; Pisa, Tuscany
- Died: 20 September 1873 (aged 46); Florence, Italy
- Awards: Lalande Prize (1858)
- Scientific career
- Fields: Astronomy

Giovanni Battista Donati Associate RAS (Italian pronunciation: [dʒoˈvanni batˈtista doˈnaːti]; 16 December 1826 – 20 September 1873) was an Italian astronomer.

Donati graduated from the university of his native city, Pisa, and afterwards joined the staff of the Observatory of Florence in 1852. He was appointed director in 1864.

Donati was also a pioneer in the spectroscopic study of the stars, the Sun, and comets. He observed the total solar eclipse of 18 July 1860, at Torreblanca in Spain, and in the same year began experiments in stellar spectroscopy. In 1862 he published a memoir, Intorno alle strie degli spettri stellari, which indicated the feasibility of a physical classification of the stars.

Donati also used spectroscopy of comets to determine their physical composition, in particular with the comet 1864b, which spectrum he found containing three emitting lines which would four years later be identified by William Huggins to be carbon. He discovered that the spectrum changed when a comet approached the Sun, and that heating caused it to emit its own light rather than reflected sunlight: he concluded that the composition of comets is, at least in part, gaseous.

Between 1854 and 1864 he discovered six new comets, including the spectacular Comet Donati (C/1858 L1), found in 1858.

An investigation of the great aurora of 4 February 1872 led Donati to refer such phenomena to a distinct branch of science, designated by him "cosmical meteorology". However, he could not follow up on the subject, as he died from cholera, which he had contracted while attending a scientific convention in Vienna, the following year.

== Honors ==
- The crater Donati on the Moon
- Asteroid 16682 Donati
