= C/1864 N1 (Tempel) =

Non-periodic comet

Discovery
- Discovered by: Wilhelm Tempel
- Discovery site: Marseille Observatory
- Discovery date: 5 July 1864

Designations
- Alternative designations: 1864 II

Orbital characteristics
- Epoch: 28 July 1864 (JD 2402080.5)
- Observation arc: 78 days
- Number of observations: 206
- Aphelion: 497 AU
- Perihelion: 0.909 AU
- Semi-major axis: 249 AU
- Eccentricity: 0.9964
- Orbital period: 3,930 years
- Inclination: 178.13°
- Longitude of ascending node: 97.67°
- Argument of periapsis: 151.58°
- Last perihelion: 16 August 1864
- T_{Jupiter}: -1.160
- Earth MOID: 0.0054 AU

Physical characteristics
- Comet total magnitude (M1): 6.2
- Apparent magnitude: 2–3 (1864 apparition)

C/1864 N1 (Tempel) is a non-periodic comet discovered by Wilhelm Tempel on 5 July 1864. It was the first comet whose spectrum was analysed.

== Observational history ==
The comet was discovered on 5 July 1864 by Wilhelm Tempel, while working in Marseille Observatory, near the star 54 Arietis. He confirmed the discovery the next day. The comet was also independently discovered by Lorenzo Respighi on 6 July and Franciszek Karliński on 11 July. Giovanni Schiaparelli observed the comet on 9 July and described it as round, with a coma 3–4 arcminutes across and an estimated magnitude of 8–9.

The comet was getting brighter as it was approaching both Earth and the Sun. Johann Friedrich Julius Schmidt spotted the comet with the naked eye on 28 July and described it as having a coma 10.5 arcminutes across and a tail 0.3° long. On 30 July he estimated the comet's magnitude to be 4. By 7 August the comet had brightened to magnitude 2–3 and featured a tail 11.5° long. The comet approached Earth at a distance of 0.096 astronomical units (14,400,000 km; 8,900,000 mi) on 8 August 1864 and was at a solar elongation of 12°.

After the closest approach the comet appeared in the evening sky. The comet was recovered by Schmidt on 9 August and the next day he estimated its magnitude to be 2–3. Consequently the comet passed perihelion on 16 August. The comet continued to have an apparent magnitude of 4–5 up to the end of August. The comet continued to fade in September as it moved away from both the Earth and the Sun. It was last spotted with the naked eye on 6 September. The comet was last observed on 5 October 1864.

In early August, Giovanni Battista Donati managed to obtain the spectrum of the comet, the first time it was achieved, by using a prism. He found three bright lines which are now known as the Swan band and are associated with carbon.

== Meteors ==
The comet has a minimum orbital intersection distance with Earth of 0.0054 AU (810,000 km). It has been associated with the weak meteor shower Delta Piscids (#410).
