= Donati (crater) =

Crater on the Moon

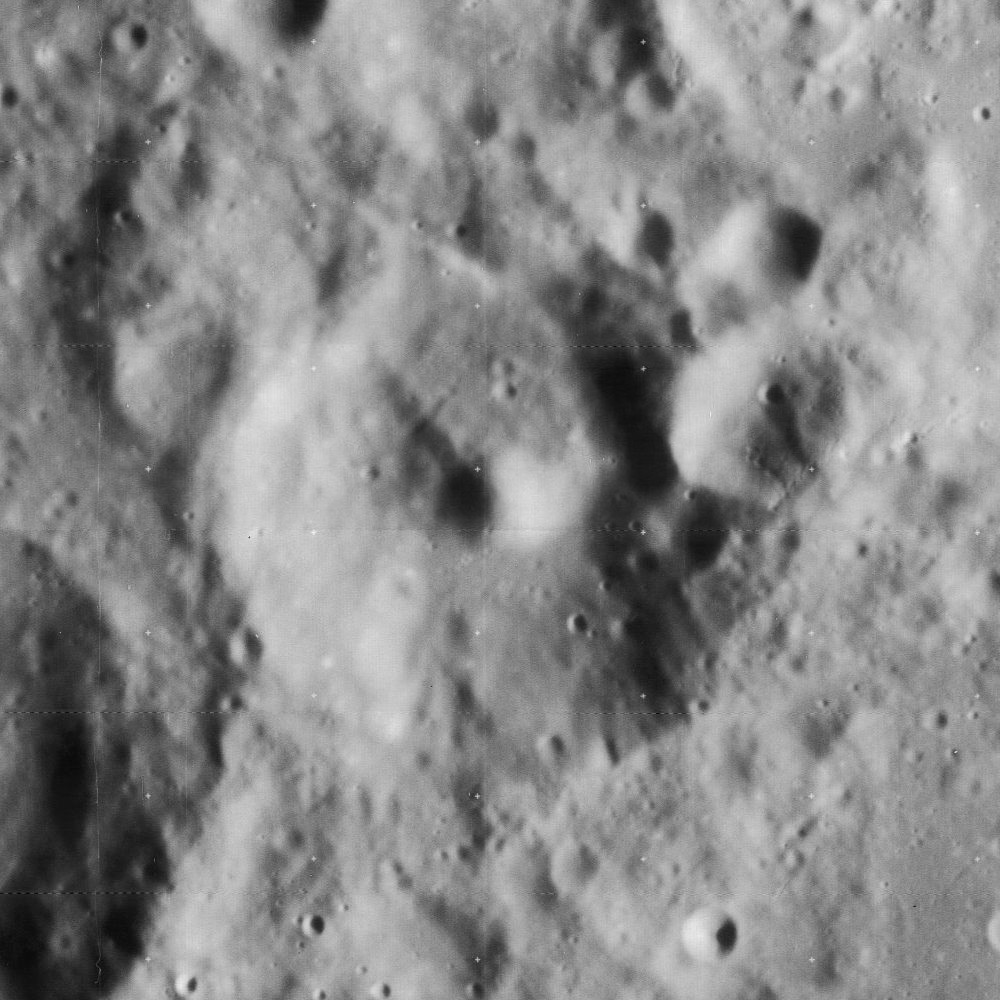
- Lunar Orbiter 4 image
- Coordinates: 20.7°S 5.2°E
- Diameter: 35.84 km (22.27 mi)
- Colongitude: 355° at sunrise
- Eponym: Giovanni B. Donati

Donati is a lunar impact crater that is located in the rugged south-central highlands of the Moon. It lies just to the northwest of the crater Faye, and the two outer rims are separated by a gap of less than 10 kilometers. To the north is the comparably sized Airy, and farther to the southeast is Playfair. Donati is 36 kilometers in diameter.

The outer wall of Donati has been eroded by subsequent impacts, particularly in the south and east, where craterlets overlie the rim. The eastern rim is overlaid by the smaller satellite crater Airy B. The inner floor of Donati is uneven and marked by small craters, particularly in the south and southwest. At the midpoint of the interior is a central rise. The crater is from the pre-Imbrian period, 4.55 to 3.85 billion years ago.

This formation is named after the Italian astronomer Giovanni Battista Donati (1826-1873). His name was introduced into lunar nomenclature during the 19th century by William R. Birt and John Lee. Its designation was officially adopted by the International Astronomical Union in 1935.

== Satellite craters ==
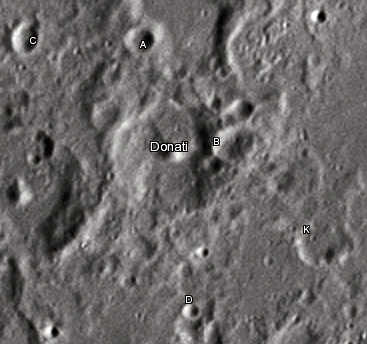
Satellite features of Donati

By convention these features are identified on lunar maps by placing the letter on the side of the crater midpoint that is closest to Donati.

Donati	Latitude	Longitude	Diameter
A	19.6° S	4.5° E	9 km
B	20.4° S	5.7° E	11 km
C	19.9° S	3.4° E	8 km
D	22.1° S	5.8° E	5 km
K	21.1° S	6.8° E	13 km
