= Giovanni Bianchini =

Italian professor of mathematics and astronomy

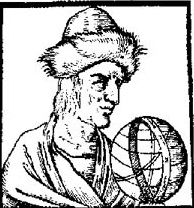
Giovanni Bianchini, in Luminarium atque planetarum motuum tabulae octoginta quinque

Giovanni Bianchini (in Latin, Johannes Blanchinus) (1410 – c. 1469) was a professor of mathematics and astronomy at the University of Ferrara and court astrologer of Leonello d'Este. He was an associate of Georg Purbach and Regiomontanus. The letters exchanged with Regiomontanus in 1463–1464 mention works by Bianchini entitled: Primum mobile (astronomical tables included), Flores almagesti, Compositio instrumenti.

Bianchini was the first mathematician in Europe to use decimal positional fractions for his trigonometric tables, at the same time as Al-Kashi in Samarkand. He was also probably the first to use the decimal point. In De arithmetica, part of the Flores almagesti, he uses operations with negative numbers and expresses the Law of Signs.

He was probably the father of the instrument maker Antonio Bianchino.

The crater Blanchinus on the Moon is named after him.

== Works ==
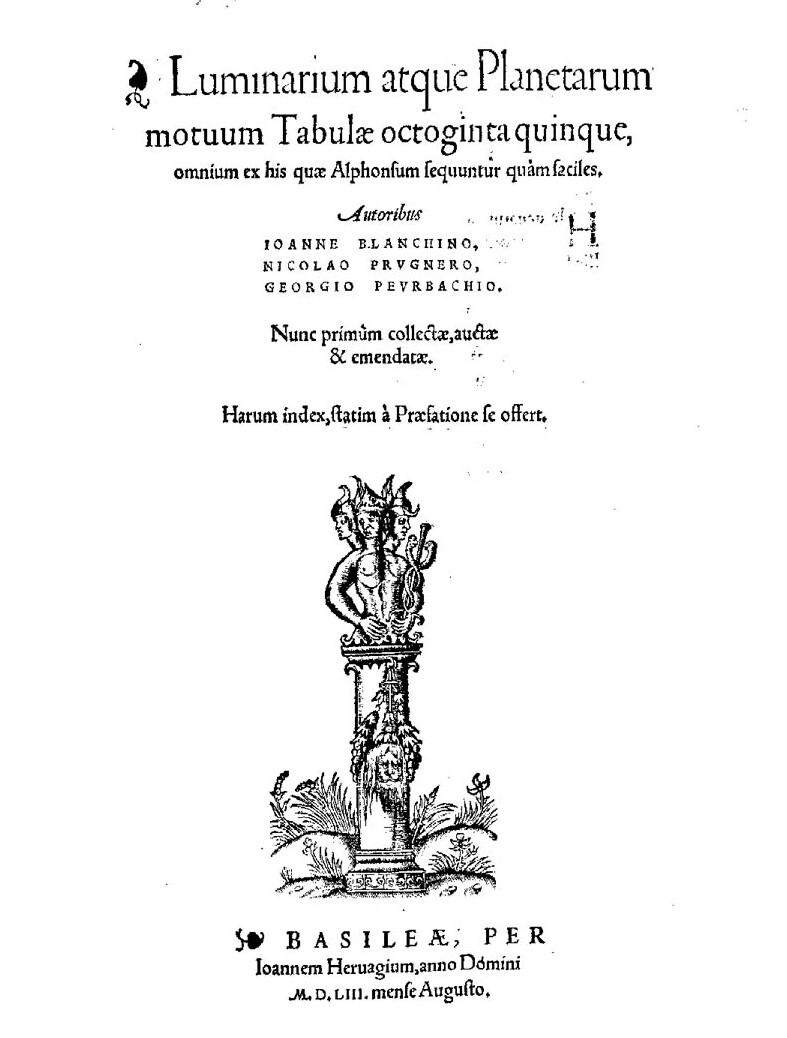
Luminarium atque planetarum motuum tabulae, 1553

- Luminarium atque planetarum motuum tabulae octoginta quinque (in Latin). Basel: Johann Herwagen (1.). 1553.
- Silvio Magrini (ed.), Joannes de Blanchinis ferrariensis e il suo carteggio scientifico col Regiomontano (1463-64), Zuffi, 1916 — Scientific letters exchanged by Bianchini and Regiomontanus

== See also ==
Giovanni Bianchini should not be confused with two similarly-named Italians with their own lunar craters: Francesco Bianchini (1662–1729) (and the Bianchini crater), and Giuseppe Biancani (1566–1624) (and the Blancanus crater).
