= Delaunay (crater) =

Crater on the Moon

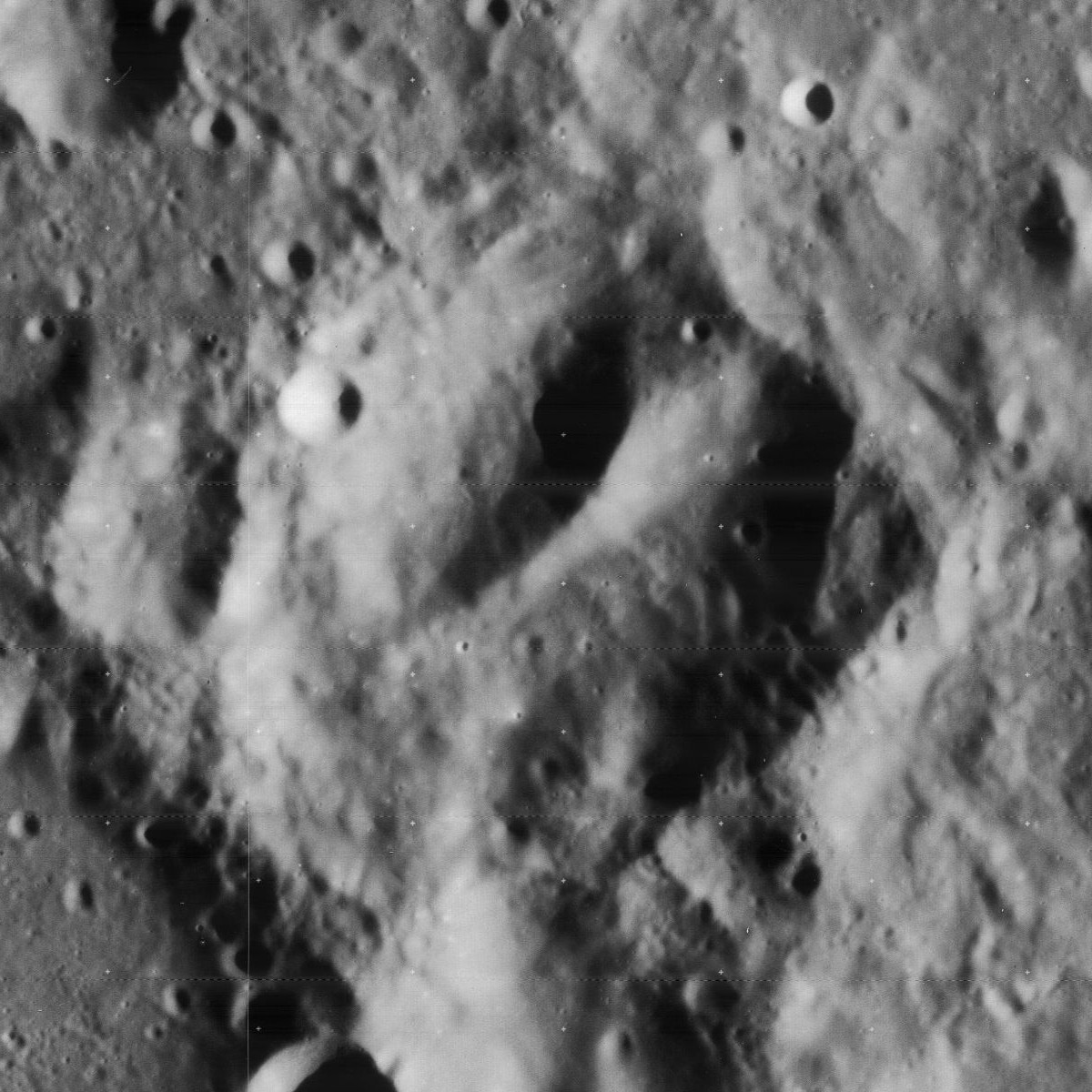
- Lunar Orbiter 4 image
- Coordinates: 22.2°S 2.5°E
- Diameter: 44.63 km (27.73 mi)
- Depth: 1.9 km
- Colongitude: 358° at sunrise
- Eponym: Charles-Eugène Delaunay

Delaunay is a compound lunar impact crater located in the southern highlands of the Moon's near side. The craters La Caille to the southwest and Faye to the northeast border on the outer rim of Delaunay. Further to the northwest is the prominent Arzachel.

This is a rectangular formation that has an interior ridge running from the northeast side that divides the crater nearly in half, and gives it a heart-shaped appearance. This ridge grows increasingly slender as it approaches the southwest rim, until it terminates at sharp point, giving it the appearance of a curved fang. The outer rim of this double crater is equally irregular, and the uneven inner wall varies significantly in width. The southern rim has been heavily damaged by impacts, including La Caille E which intrudes into the interior.

This formation is named after French astronomer and mathematician Charles-Eugène Delaunay (1816-1872), who was notable for his studies of lunar motion. His name was introduced with the lunar nomenclature of William R. Birt and John Lee in the 19th century. Its designation was formally adopted by the International Astronomical Union in 1935.

== Satellite craters ==
By convention these features are identified on lunar maps by placing the letter on the side of the crater midpoint that is closest to Delaunay.

Delaunay	Latitude	Longitude	Diameter
A	21.9° S	2.0° E	6 km
