= Walther (crater) =

Crater on the Moon

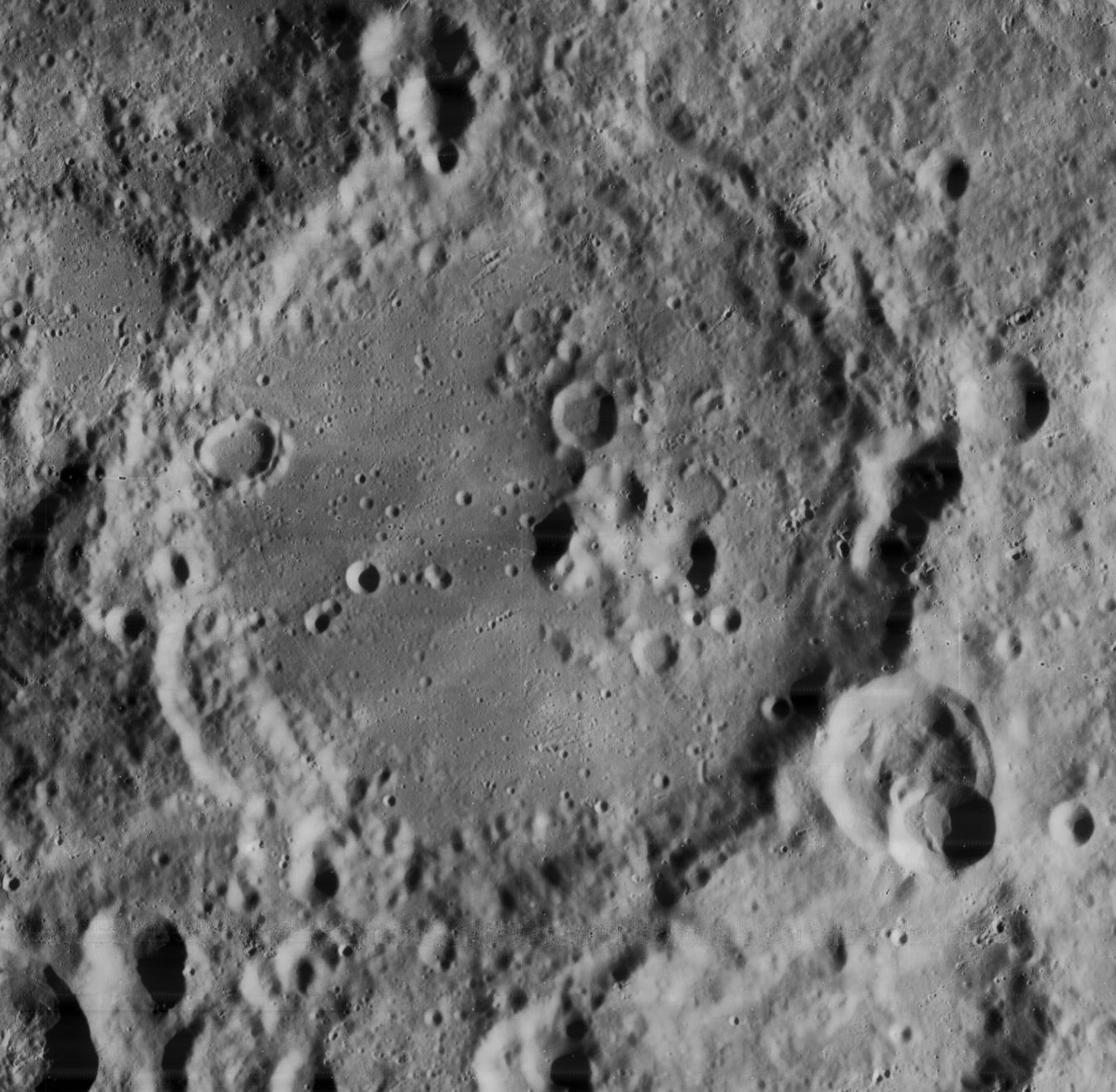
- Lunar Orbiter 4 image
- Coordinates: 33.0°S 0.7°E
- Diameter: 132 × 140 km
- Depth: 4.1 km
- Colongitude: 359° at sunrise
- Eponym: Bernhard Walther

Walther is an ancient lunar impact crater located in the southern highland region of the Moon. It is joined along the western rim to the crater Deslandres. To the northeast is Aliacensis, and joined to the southeast rim is the irregular Nonius.

== Description ==
The rim of Walther is complex, heavily eroded and incised by lesser impacts. The wall retains a generally circular form, but many of its features have been worn away and there is a slight protruding bulge in the western rim. The floor has been resurfaced after the original impact, leaving the southwestern half relatively smooth. In the northwest quadrant is an offset central peak that has been worn and impacted by several small craters.

== Names ==
Walther is named after the German astronomer Bernhard Walther. Like many of the craters on the Moon's near side, it was named (in the Latin form, 'Valtherus') by Giovanni Riccioli, whose 1651 nomenclature system has become standardized. Earlier lunar cartographers had given the feature different names: Michael van Langren's 1645 map calls it "Caroli I Reg. Britt.", after King Charles I of England, and Johannes Hevelius grouped it with Purbach and Regiomontanus as "Mons Libanus" after Mount Lebanon.

== Satellite craters ==
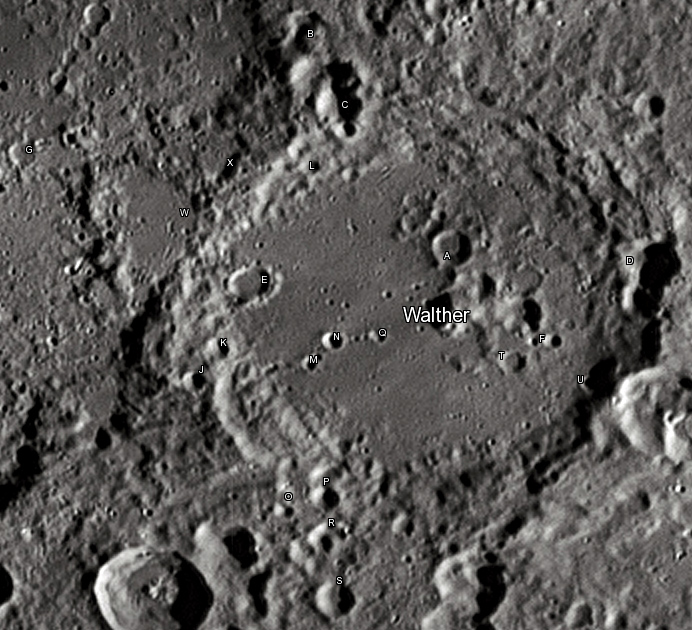
Walthercrater and its satellite craters taken from Earth in 2012 at the University of Hertfordshire's Bayfordbury Observatory with the telescopes Meade LX200 14" and Lumenera Skynyx 2-1

By convention these features are identified on lunar maps by placing the letter on the side of the crater midpoint that is closest to Walther.

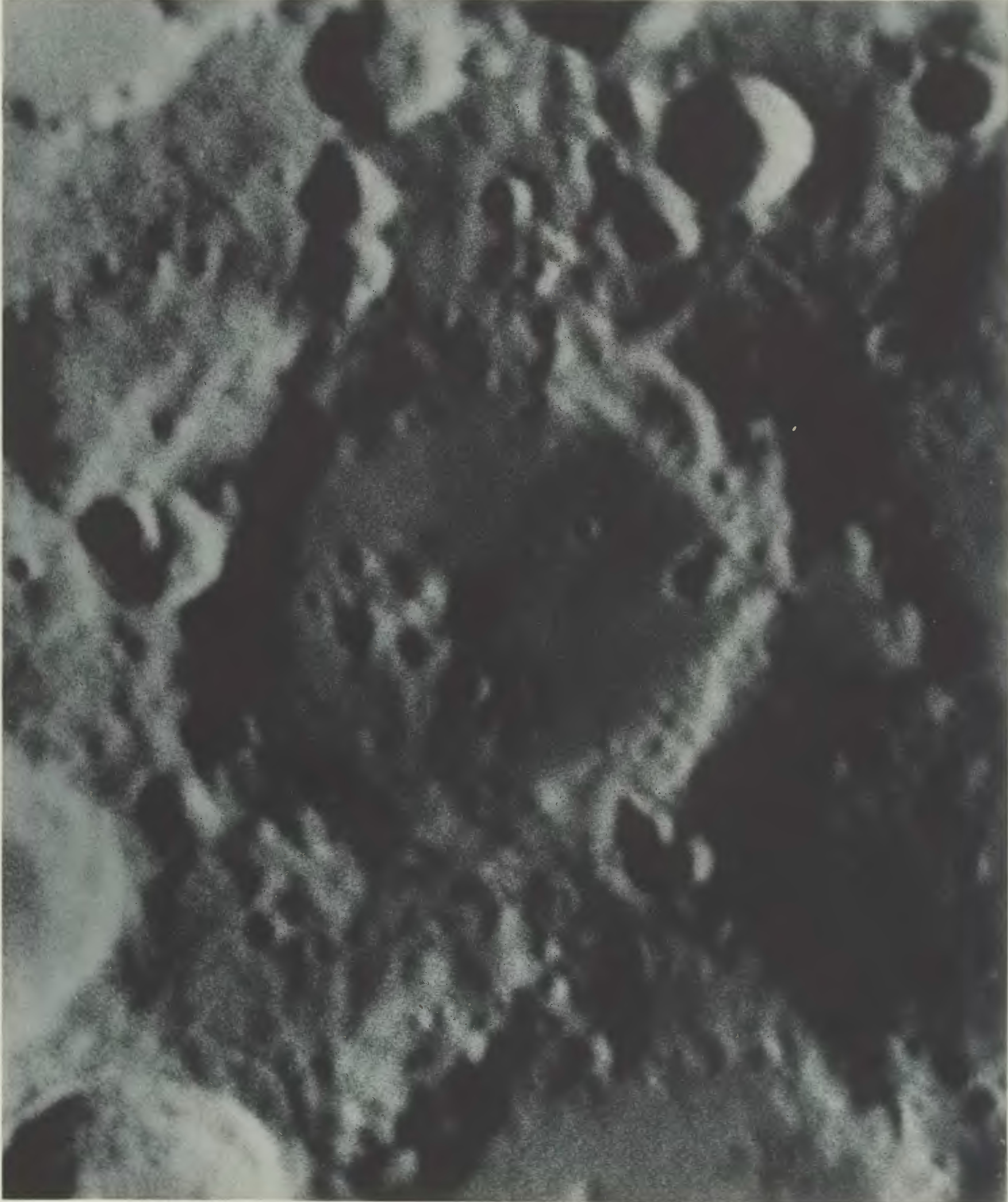
Walther Crater in Ladislaus Weinek's Lunar Atlas (1898), north on the photo is downward

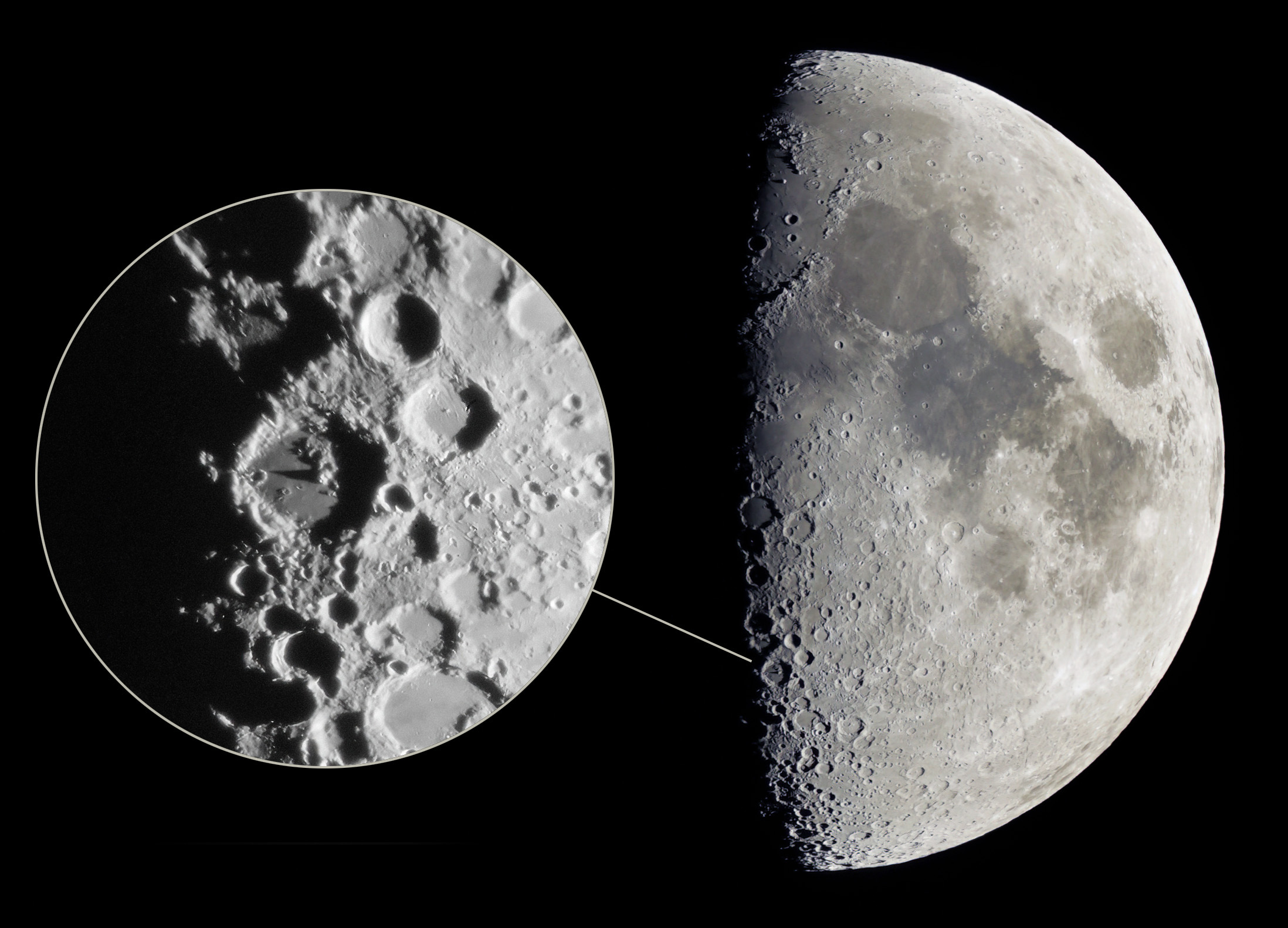
Observing guide to locating the crater Walther

Walther	Latitude	Longitude	Diameter
A	32.4° S	0.7° E	12 km
B	30.5° S	1.4° W	9 km
C	31.2° S	0.8° W	14 km
D	32.0° S	2.8° E	18 km
E	33.3° S	1.2° W	13 km
F	33.1° S	2.1° E	6 km
G	32.5° S	3.9° W	8 km
J	34.4° S	1.5° W	7 km
K	34.1° S	1.4° W	7 km
L	31.9° S	0.9° W	5 km
M	34.0° S	0.3° W	5 km
N	33.7° S	0.2° W	6 km
O	35.6° S	0.1° W	6 km
P	35.4° S	0.2° E	9 km
Q	33.5° S	0.3° E	4 km
R	35.8° S	0.4° E	8 km
S	36.4° S	0.6° E	12 km
T	33.4° S	1.8° E	8 km
U	33.4° S	2.7° E	4 km
W	32.8° S	2.5° W	36 km
X	32.1° S	1.9° W	10 km
