= Lunar X =

Shadow pattern on the Moon

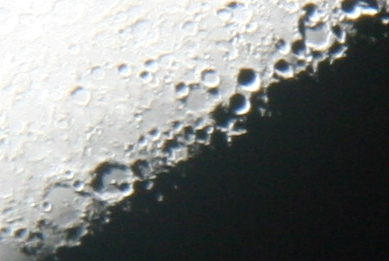
Lunar X formation taken January 30, 2012, the formation is off the center towards the right

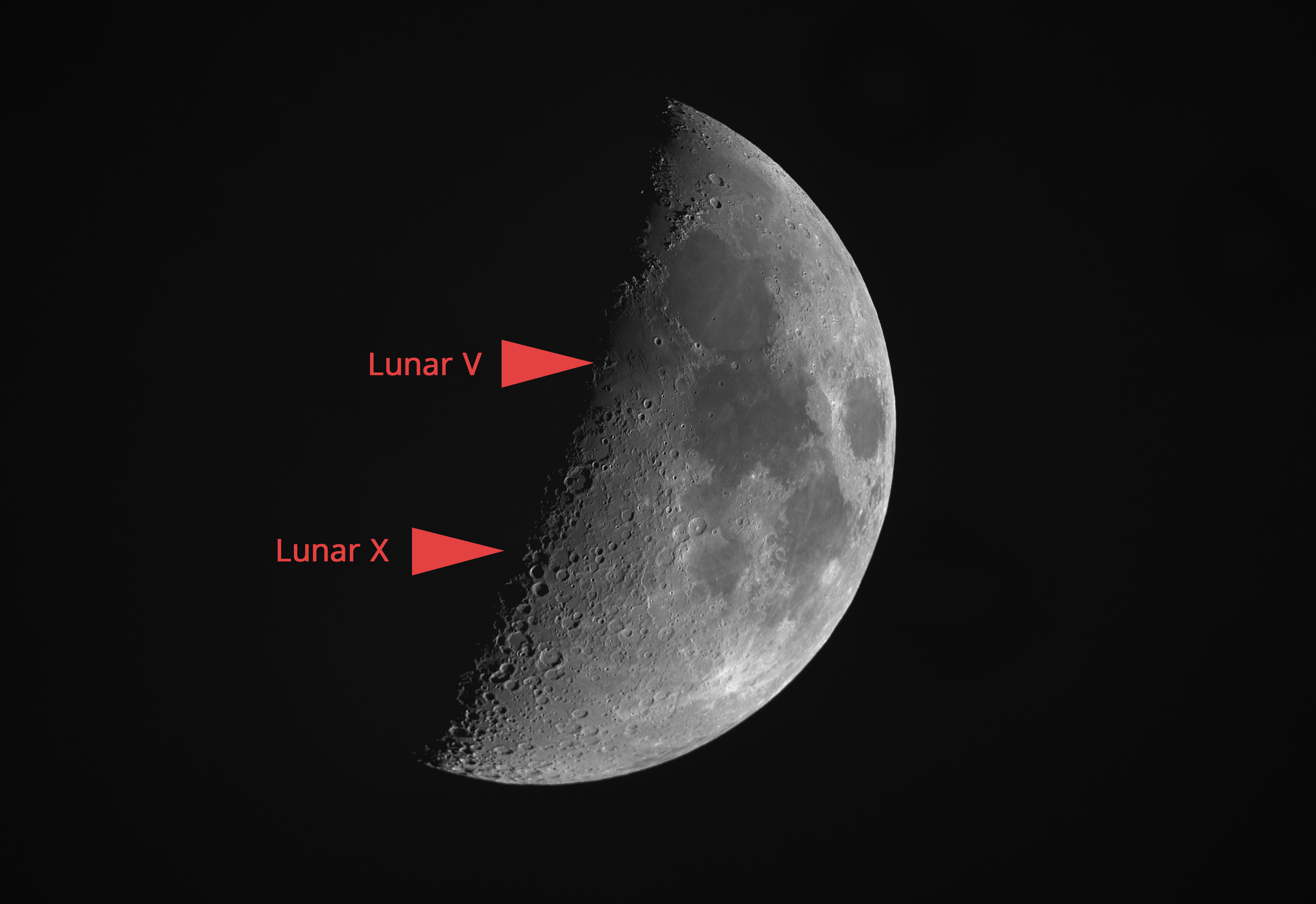
Lunar X and Lunar V recorded on a Skywatcher 150/750 with a ASI294MC Pro on May 29, 2020, in Mainz, Germany

The Lunar X (also known as the Werner X) is a clair-obscur effect in which light and shadow creates the appearance of a letter 'X' on the rim of the Blanchinus, La Caille and Purbach craters of the Moon.

The X is visible only for a few hours before the first quarter, slightly below the lunar terminator. Near to the X, the Lunar V is also visible, formed by Ukert crater and several other small craters.

A photograph of the clair-obscur effects known as the Lunar X (located near craters Blachinus, La Caille, and Purbach) and the Lunar V (near crater Ukert), captured during the First Quarter moon phase on July 21 2026, from The Netherlands, using a 120 mm refractor telescope

An Annotated closeup photograph of the clair-obscur effects known as the Lunar X (located near craters Blachinus, La Caille, and Purbach) and the Lunar V (near crater Ukert), captured during the First Quarter moon phase on July 21 2026, from The Netherlands, using a 120 mm refractor telescope

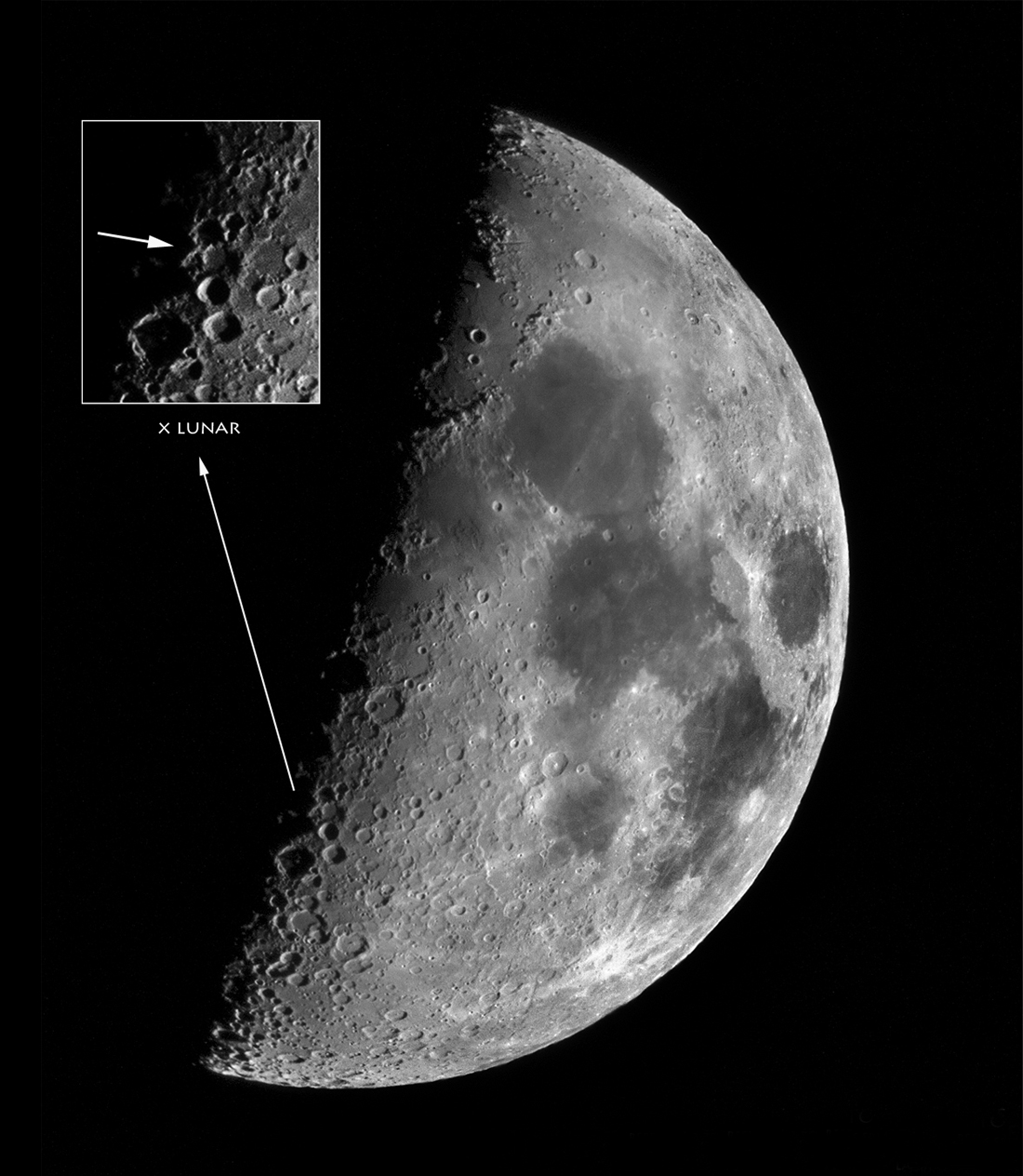
Half waxing moon with inset closeup of Lunar X, used by a 60mm refractor telescope
