= Regiomontanus (crater) =

Crater on the Moon

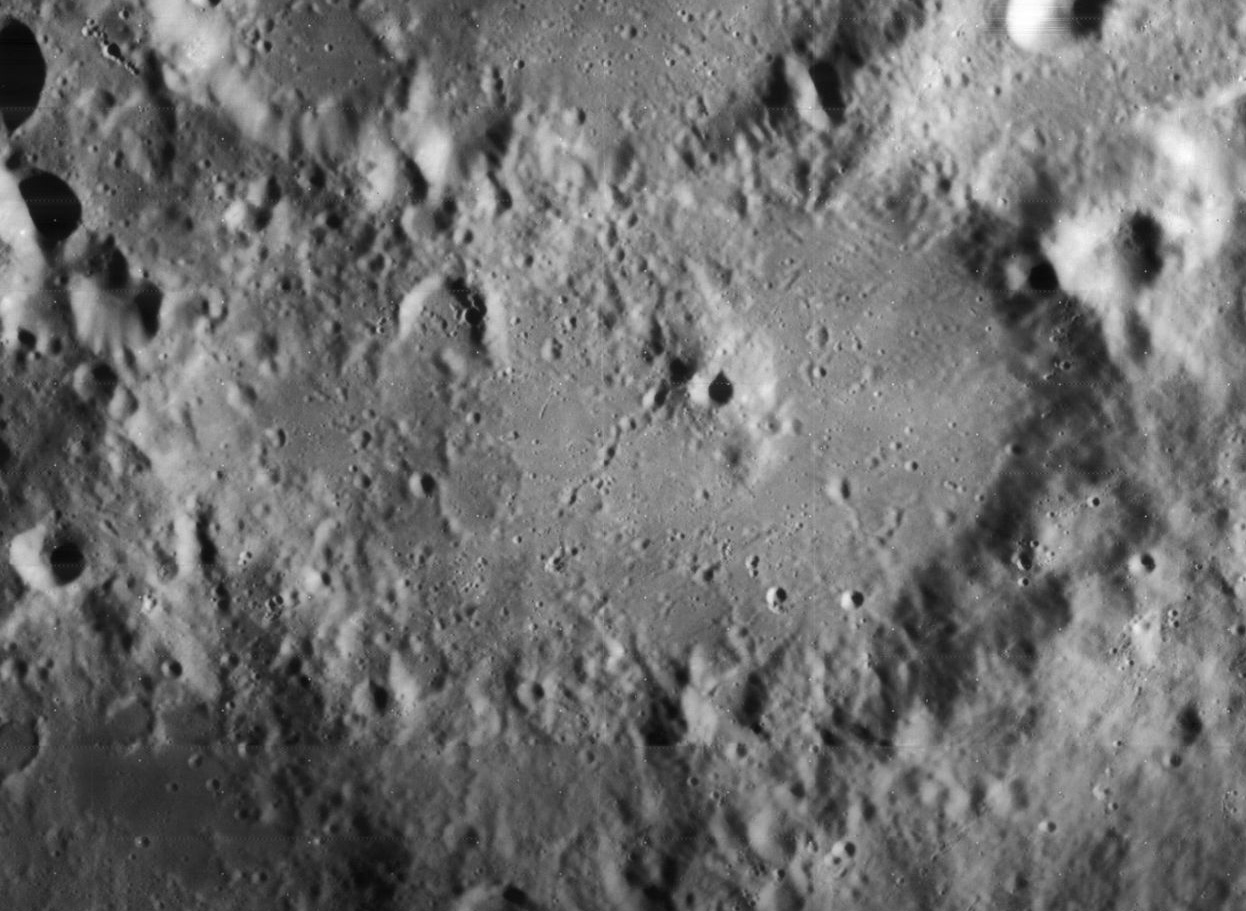
- Lunar Orbiter 4 image
- Coordinates: 28.4°S 1.0°W
- Diameter: 126 × 110 km
- Depth: 1.7 km
- Colongitude: 2° at sunrise
- Formation: Pre-Nectarian
- Eponym: Regiomontanus

Regiomontanus is an ancient lunar impact crater located in the southern highlands region to the southeast of Mare Nubium. It is joined at the chaotic northern rim by the crater Purbach, and to the south-southeast is Walther.

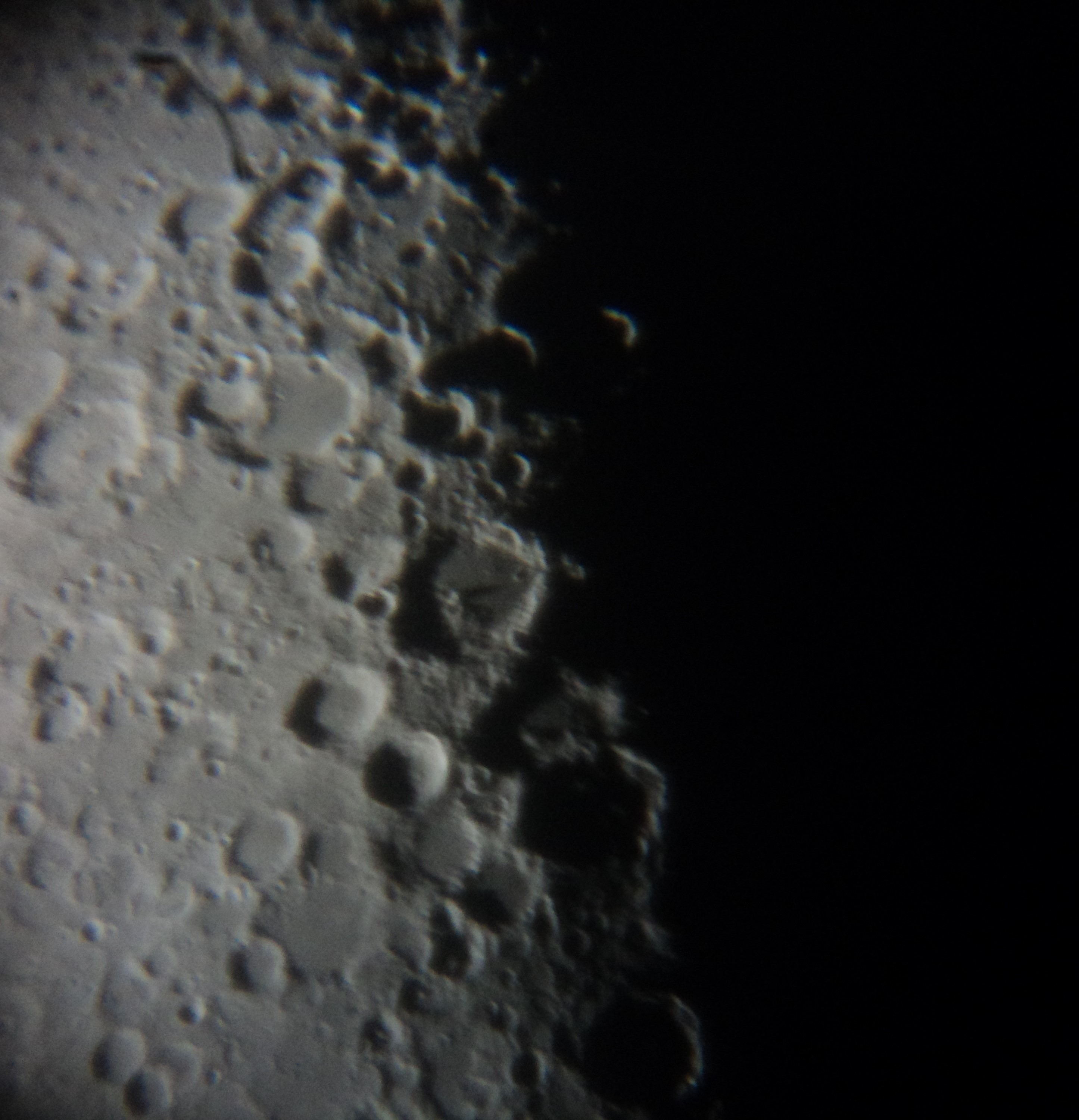
Regiomontanus as seen from Earth during the first quarter of the Moon

== Characteristics ==
The crater is heavily worn from impact erosion, and the rim is irregular, mountainous and distinctly oval in outline. The walls on the southern and western edges have been almost completely degraded. A prominent ridge lies off-center to the northwest, with the small crater Regiomontanus A at its summit. The crater floor is lava-flooded, and has a number of small crater impacts.

The summit crater Regiomontanus A was once considered proof of volcanic activity on the Moon. However this feature is actually an impact crater, and is offset slightly from the summit of the central peak.

== Name ==
Regiomontanus is named after the 15th century German astronomer and mathematician Johannes Müller von Königsberg, known as Regiomontanus. Like many of the craters on the Moon's near side, it was given its name by Giovanni Riccioli, whose 1651 nomenclature system has become standardized. Earlier lunar cartographers had given the feature different names. Michael van Langren's 1645 map calls it "Christinae Reg. Suec." after Christina, Queen of Sweden. And Johannes Hevelius grouped it with Purbach and Walther as "Mons Libanus" after Mount Lebanon.

== Satellite craters ==
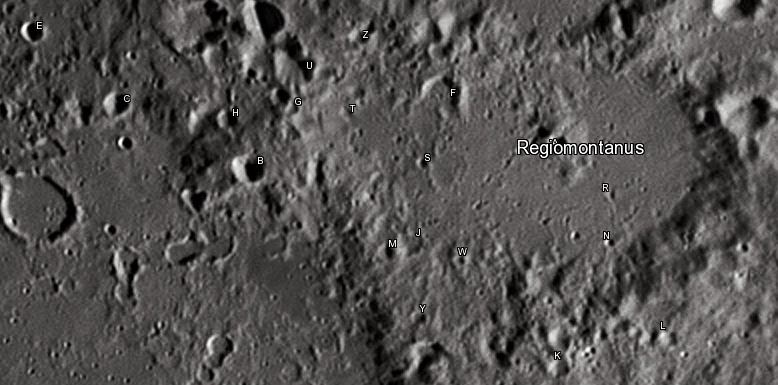
Regiomontanus crater and its satellite craters taken from Earth in 2012 at the University of Hertfordshire's Bayfordbury Observatory with the telescopes Meade LX200 14" and Lumenera Skynyx 2-1

By convention these features are identified on lunar maps by placing the letter on the side of the crater midpoint that is closest to Regiomontanus.

Regiomontanus	Latitude	Longitude	Diameter
A	28.0° S	0.6° W	6 km
B	29.0° S	3.7° W	10 km
C	28.7° S	5.2° W	8 km
E	28.2° S	6.2° W	6 km
F	27.8° S	1.9° W	11 km
G	28.2° S	3.6° W	5 km
H	28.6° S	4.0° W	6 km
J	29.4° S	1.9° W	8 km
K	30.3° S	0.0° W	6 km
L	29.7° S	1.1° E	6 km
M	29.6° S	2.1° W	5 km
N	28.9° S	0.1° E	3 km
R	28.4° S	0.0° W	3 km
S	28.6° S	2.0° W	4 km
T	28.1° S	2.9° W	5 km
U	27.9° S	3.5° W	11 km
W	29.5° S	1.4° W	3 km
Y	30.1° S	1.6° W	5 km
Z	27.5° S	3.0° W	6 km
