= Nonius (crater) =

Crater on the Moon

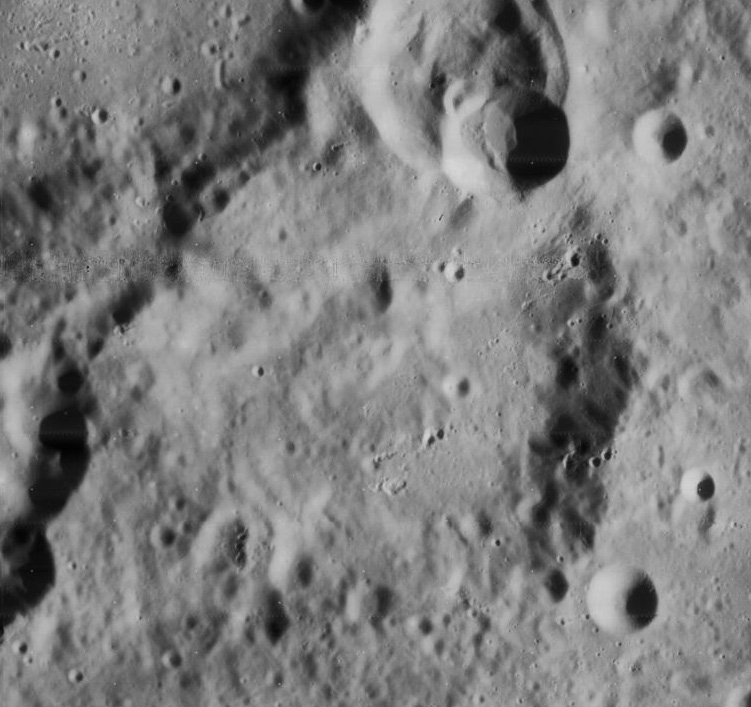
- Lunar Orbiter 4 image
- Coordinates: 34.8°S 3.8°E
- Diameter: 69 km
- Depth: 2.99 km (1.86 mi)
- Colongitude: 357° at sunrise
- Eponym: Pedro Nunes

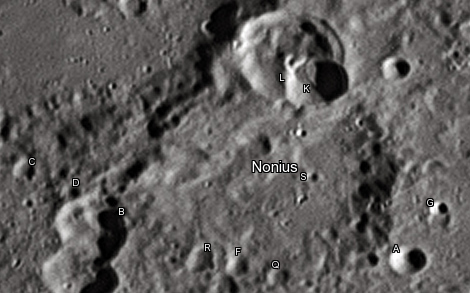
Satellite craters

Nonius is a lunar impact crater. It is located in the rugged southern highlands on the Moon's near side. It was named after 16th century Portuguese mathematician Pedro Nunes, Latinized as Nonius. The northwestern side and about half the interior floor are overlain by the rim and outer rampart of Walther, a walled plain. About half its diameter to the southeast is the smaller crater Kaiser, and slightly farther to the south lies Fernelius.

The surviving rim of this crater has been damaged by multiple impacts, including the merged pair of Nonius K and Nonius L across the northern rim. The surviving outline is more hexagonal in shape than round. The interior floor has an uneven surface, with low ridges and a crater-formed gouge in the western half.

== Satellite craters ==
By convention these features are identified on lunar maps by placing the letter on the side of the crater midpoint that is closest to Nonius.

Nonius	Latitude	Longitude	Diameter
A	35.4° S	5.6° E	10 km
B	35.8° S	2.0° E	21 km
C	35.4° S	1.1° E	7 km
D	35.5° S	1.8° E	6 km
F	35.9° S	3.8° E	7 km
G	34.7° S	5.7° E	6 km
K	33.7° S	3.9° E	18 km
L	33.5° S	3.5° E	31 km
Q	35.9° S	4.2° E	7 km
R	35.9° S	3.3° E	10 km
S	34.8° S	4.3° E	4 km
