= La Caille (crater) =

Crater on the Moon

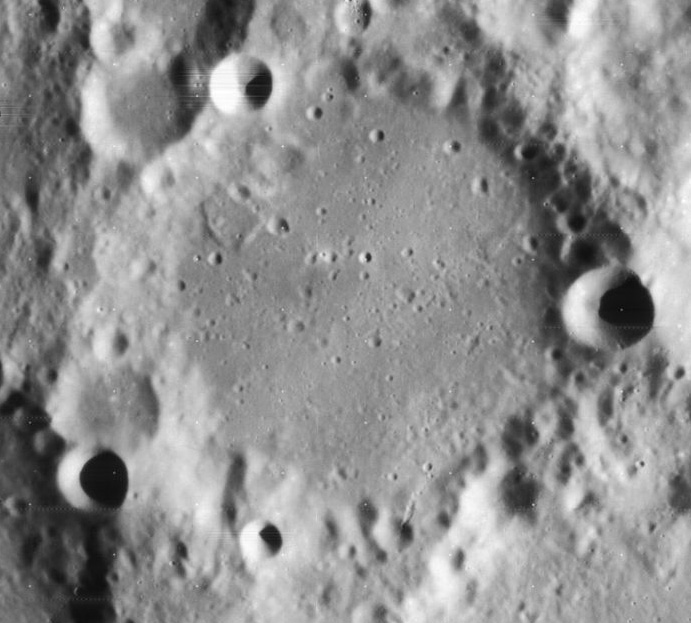
- Lunar Orbiter 4 image
- Coordinates: 23.8°S 1.1°E
- Diameter: 68 km
- Depth: 2.8 km
- Colongitude: 358° at sunrise
- Eponym: Nicolas-Louis de Lacaille

La Caille is a lunar impact crater located in the rugged south-central highlands of the Moon. It was named after the French astronomer Nicolas-Louis de Lacaille. It is located to the northeast of the crater Purbach. Nearly attached to the southeast rim are the remains of Blanchinus, and the two are separated by a rugged stretch of terrain. To the northeast is Delaunay, a formation split in half by a ridge.

The floor of La Caille has been flooded in the past by lava, and the surface is relatively smooth and flat with no central rise. Only a few tiny craterlets along the north and northwest edges disrupt the surface. Ray material lies across the central and southern parts of the floor, most likely from Tycho to the southwest.

The rim of this crater is heavily worn and battered, with notches around the interior edge and craters across the top and along the exterior. The most notable of these is La Caille B which lies across the eastern rim.

For a few hours before the first quarter, the crater's rim contributes to the Lunar X visual phenomenon.

== Satellite craters ==
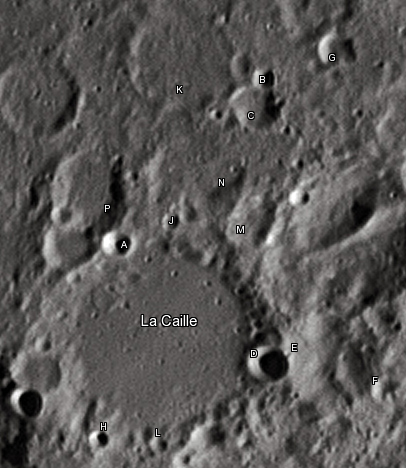
La Caille and its satellite craters taken from Earth in 2012 at the University of Hertfordshire's Bayfordbury Observatory with the telescopes Meade LX200 14" and Lumenera Skynyx 2-1

By convention these features are identified on lunar maps by placing the letter on the side of the crater midpoint that is closest to La Caille.

la Caille	Latitude	Longitude	Diameter
A	22.8° S	0.4° E	8 km
B	20.9° S	1.4° E	7 km
C	21.2° S	1.4° E	15 km
D	23.6° S	2.2° E	12 km
E	23.5° S	2.8° E	27 km
F	23.6° S	3.4° E	8 km
G	20.5° S	2.0° E	11 km
H	24.7° S	0.8° E	6 km
J	22.5° S	0.9° E	5 km
K	21.0° S	0.6° E	30 km
L	24.6° S	1.4° E	5 km
M	22.3° S	1.6° E	15 km
N	21.9° S	1.3° E	10 km
P	22.5° S	0.0° E	25 km
