= Kaiser (lunar crater) =

Crater on the Moon

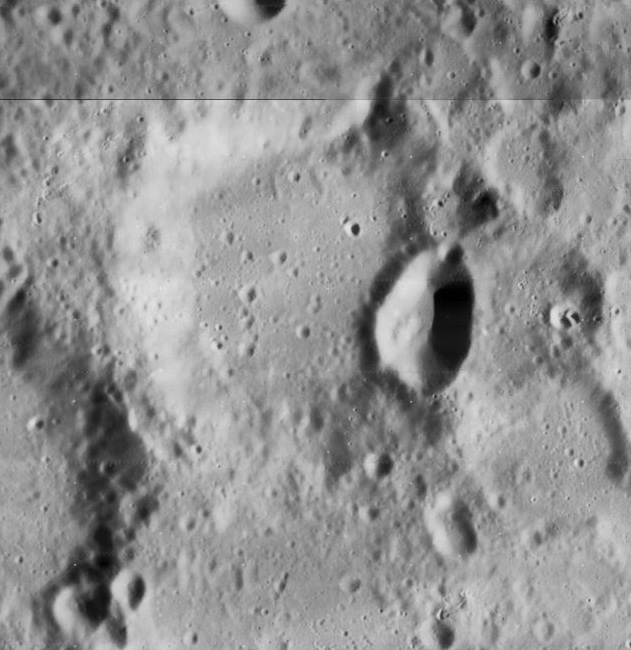
- Mosaic of Lunar Orbiter 4 images
- Coordinates: 36.5°S 6.5°E
- Diameter: 52 km
- Depth: 1.8 km
- Colongitude: 354° at sunrise
- Eponym: Frederik Kaiser

Kaiser is a lunar impact crater. It lies in the crater-riddled terrain in the southern part of the Moon's near side. It was named after the Dutch astronomer Frederik Kaiser. The crater is nearly attached to the northeast rim the slightly larger crater Fernelius, and the two are separated by an irregular patch of ground only a few kilometers wide. To the northwest of Kaiser lies Nonius, a crater remnant.

The rim of this crater is heavily worn from impact erosion, and the features have been generally softened and rounded. Parts of the southern inner wall has become incised, and the elongated satellite crater Kaiser A lies across the eastern rim. The interior floor of Kaiser is relatively featureless, being marked only by a few tiny craterlets.

== Kaiser during full moon ==
Of crater Kaiser there is almost nothing recognizable during full moon. Bright satellite crater Kaiser C, east of Kaiser itself, is a handy guide to get to the location of Kaiser. Because of the brightness of Kaiser C, this satellite crater looks like a knot in the pronounced northeastern ejectaray from crater Tycho. Bright bowl-shaped crater Kaiser C is also noticeable on the photographic version of chart LAC 112 (page 224) in The Clementine Atlas of the Moon (Ben Bussey / Paul D. Spudis).

== Satellite craters ==
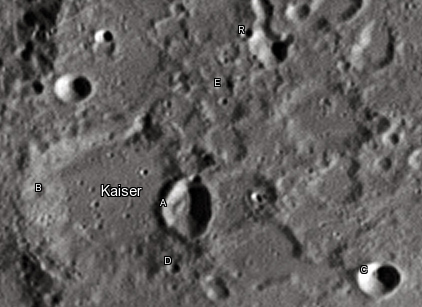
Kaiser crater and its satellite craters taken from Earth in 2012 at the University of Hertfordshire's Bayfordbury Observatory with the telescopes Meade LX200 14" and Lumenera Skynyx 2-1

By convention these features are identified on lunar maps by placing the letter on the side of the crater midpoint that is closest to Kaiser.

Kaiser	Latitude	Longitude	Diameter
A	36.3° S	7.3° E	20 × 14 km
B	36.3° S	5.6° E	6 km
C	36.5° S	9.7° E	12 km
D	37.0° S	7.4° E	5 km
E	34.9° S	7.1° E	5 km
R	34.3° S	7.2° E	4 km
