= Purbach (crater) =

Crater on the Moon

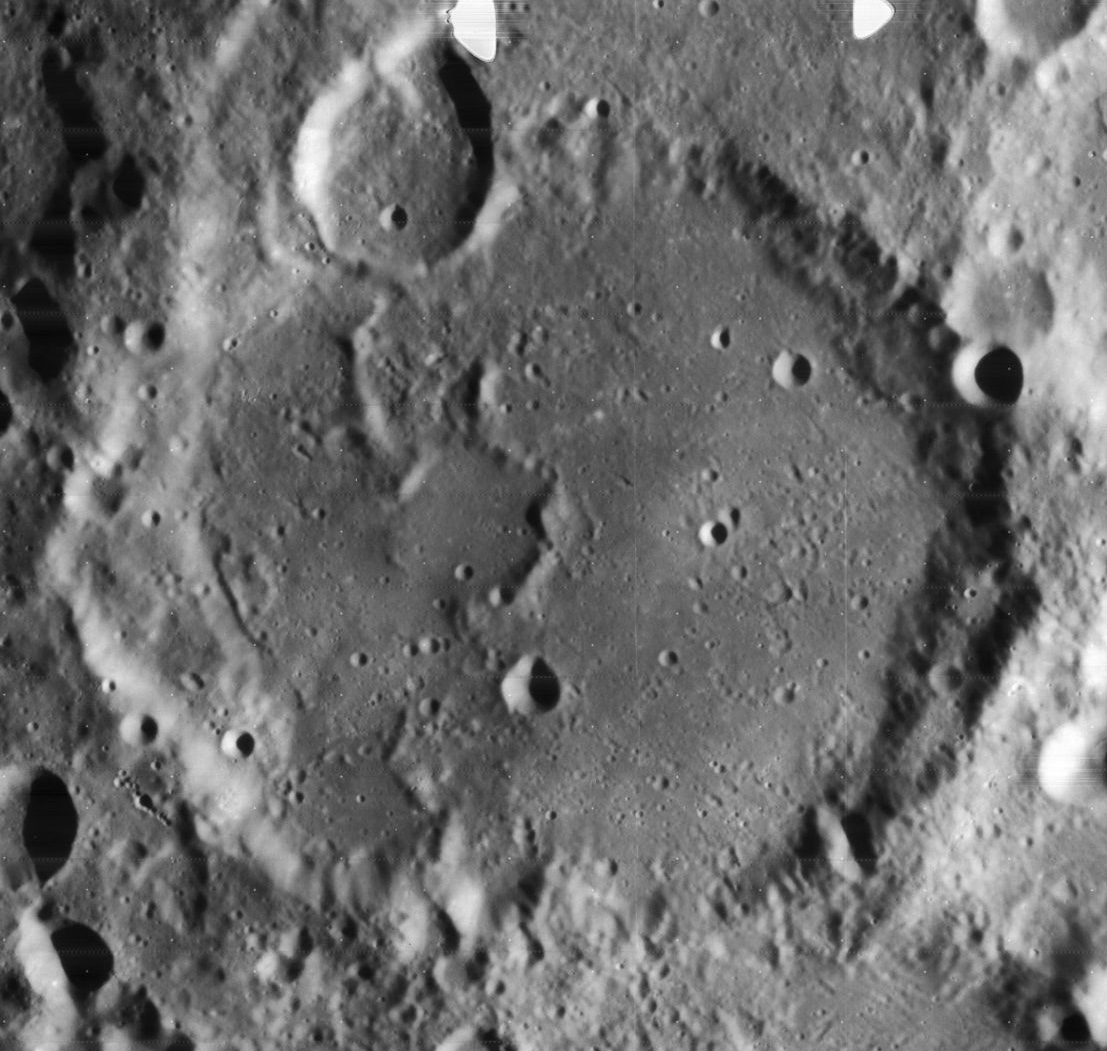
- Lunar Orbiter 4 image
- Coordinates: 25.5°S 1.9°W
- Diameter: 118 km
- Depth: 3.0 km
- Colongitude: 3° at sunrise
- Formation: Pre-Nectarian
- Eponym: Georg von Peuerbach

Purbach is a large lunar impact crater in the rugged southern highlands of the Moon. The distorted crater Regiomontanus is attached to the southern rim. To the northwest is Thebit and just to the northeast lies La Caille.

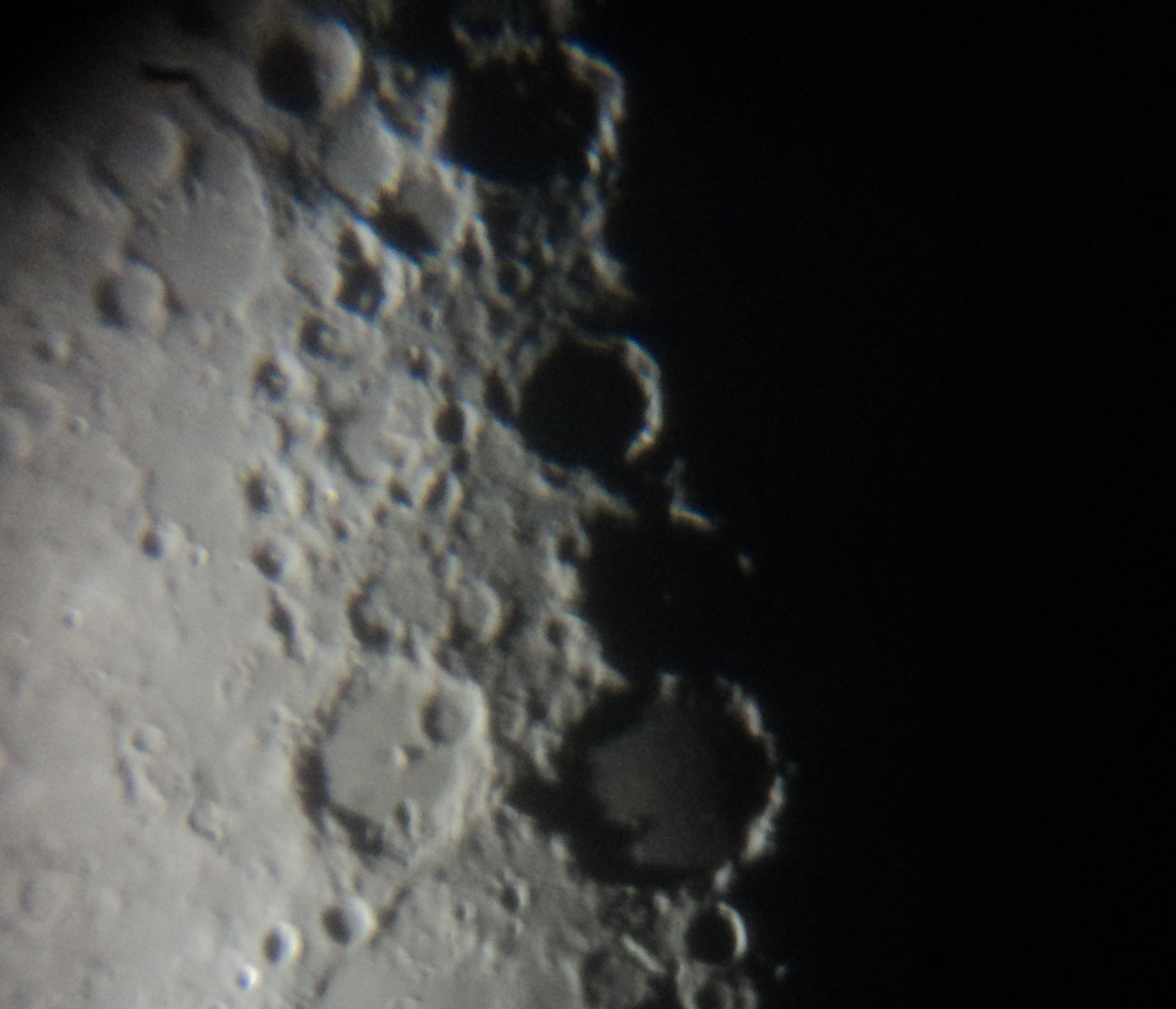
The moon's terminator at Purbach and the surroundings craters, on Earth, it is the first quarter

== Description ==
On the lunar geologic timescale, this crater dates to the Pre-Nectarian epoch. The outer wall of Purbach is heavily worn, with the most intact section being along the east and northeast sides. The shared rim between Purbach and Regiomontanus is incised and rugged. The wall is distorted along the western edge, giving the appearance of a double rim, with the second rim distended towards the west. The northern wall is almost completely destroyed, and somewhat irregular Purbach G lies across the northwest rim.

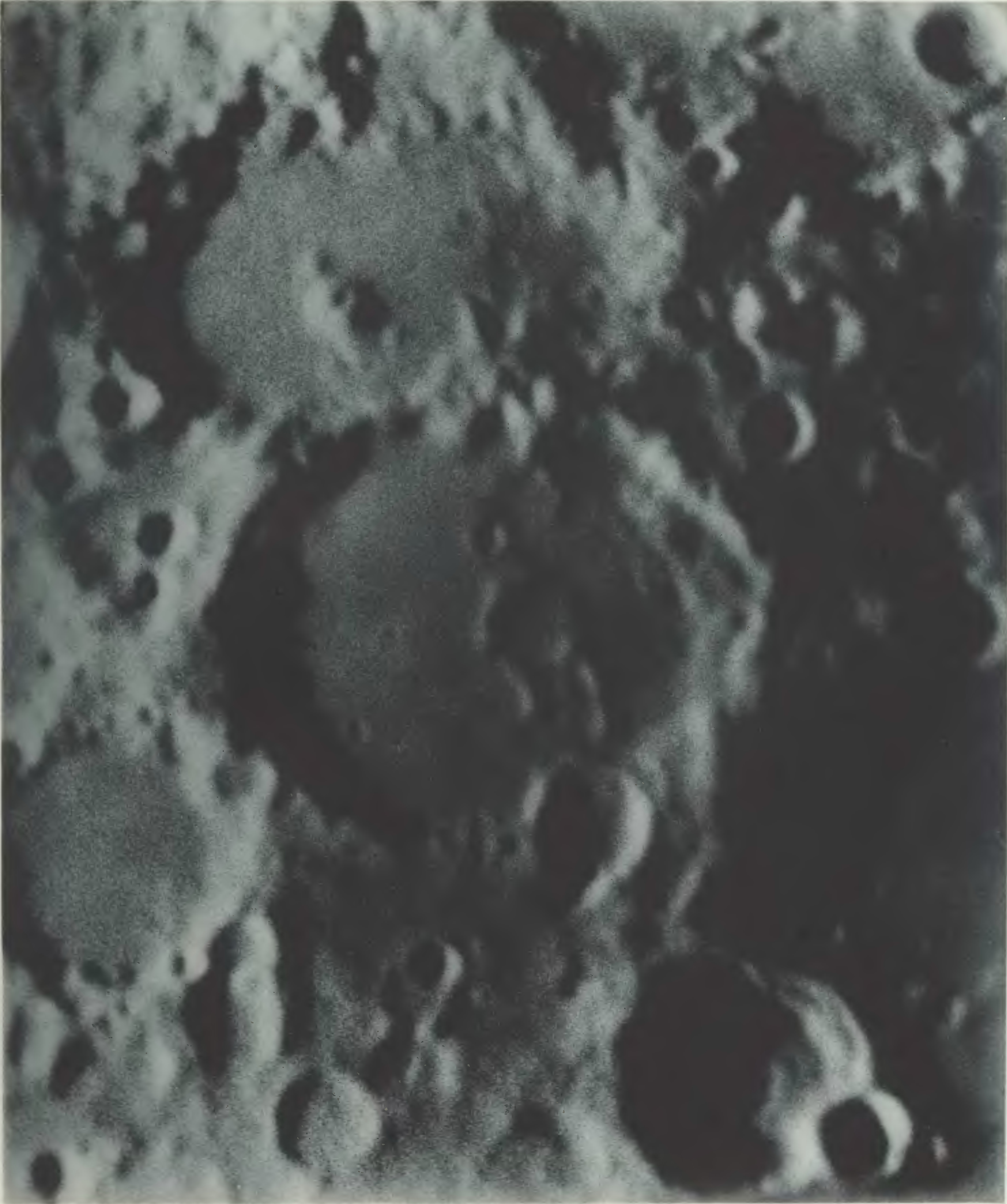
Purbach crater and its surroundings in Weinek's Lunar Atlas (1898) - North is faced downward

The crater floor is relatively smooth in the eastern half, with a low series of ridges and a partial ghost crater outline just to the west of the crater midpoint. If the crater possessed a central peak, it has either been removed or forms part of the ridges to the west.

For a few hours before the first quarter, the crater's rim contributes to the "Lunar X" visual phenomenon, in which an 'X' shape briefly appears on the Moon's terminator as sunlight glances on the tops of shadowed hills.

== Names ==
Purbach is named after the 15th century Austrian astronomer Georg von Peuerbach. Like many of the craters on the Moon's near side, it was named (in the Latin form, 'Purbachius') by Giovanni Riccioli, whose 1651 nomenclature system has become standardized. Earlier lunar cartographers had given the feature different names: Michael van Langren's 1645 map calls it "Christierni IV Reg. Daniae", after King Christian IV of Denmark, and Johannes Hevelius grouped it with Walther and Regiomontanus under the name "Mons Libanus", after Mount Lebanon.

== Satellite craters ==
By convention these features are identified on lunar maps by placing the letter on the side of the crater midpoint that is closest to Purbach.

Purbach	Latitude	Longitude	Diameter
A	26.1° S	1.9° W	8 km
B	26.9° S	4.2° W	16 km
C	27.7° S	4.6° W	18 km
D	22.8° S	1.6° W	12 km
E	21.7° S	0.7° W	23 km
F	24.6° S	0.0° W	9 km
G	23.9° S	2.8° W	27 km
H	25.5° S	5.6° W	29 km
J	27.5° S	3.9° W	12 km
K	25.2° S	4.6° W	8 km
L	25.1° S	5.0° W	17 km
M	24.8° S	4.4° W	17 km
N	26.2° S	5.4° W	7 km
O	24.7° S	3.8° W	5 km
P	26.4° S	3.7° W	5 km
Q	25.9° S	0.0° W	4 km
R	26.5° S	3.2° W	4 km
S	27.3° S	2.3° W	9 km
T	24.6° S	0.9° W	5 km
U	27.0° S	2.0° W	15 km
V	26.7° S	0.3° W	6 km
W	25.5° S	2.3° W	20 km
X	25.4° S	1.1° W	4 km
Y	25.8° S	6.8° W	16 km
