= Georg von Peuerbach =

Austrian astronomer, mathematician and instrument maker (1423-1461)

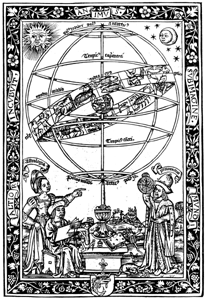
- Georg von Peuerbach: Theoricarum novarum planetarum testus, Paris 1515
- Born: 30 May 1423; Peuerbach near Linz, Duchy of Austria, Holy Roman Empire
- Died: 8 April 1461 (aged 37); Vienna, Archduchy of Austria, Holy Roman Empire
- Education: University of Vienna (B.A., 1448)
- Known for: Reviving Ptolemaic astronomy in Europe; Introducing sine tables to Europe
- Scientific career
- Fields: Mathematics (trigonometry), astronomy
- Workplaces: University of Vienna
- Academic advisors: Johannes von Gmunden
- Notable students: Regiomontanus

Georg von Peuerbach (also Purbach, Peurbach; Latin: Purbachius; 30 May 1423 – 8 April 1461) was an Austrian astronomer, poet, mathematician and instrument maker, best known for his streamlined presentation of Ptolemaic astronomy in the Theoricae Novae Planetarum. Peuerbach was instrumental in making astronomy, mathematics and literature simple and accessible for Europeans during the Renaissance and beyond.

== Biography ==
Peuerbach's life remains relatively unknown until he enrolled at the University of Vienna in 1446. He was born in the Austrian town of Peuerbach in upper Austria. A horoscope published eighty-nine years after his death places his date of birth specifically on 30 May 1423, though other evidence only indicates that he was born sometime after 1421. He received his Bachelor of Arts in 1448.

Peuerbach's intellect was discovered by a priest of his hometown, Dr. Heinrich Barucher. Dr. Barucher recognized Peuerbach's academic abilities from a young age and put him in contact with the Augustinian provost of Klosterneuburg Monastery, Georg Muestinger. Georg Muestinger taught a course at the University of Vienna entitled Theoricae Planetarum. These lectures were the first that Georg von Peuerbach attended at the University of Vienna and inspired him to enroll.

During his time at University of Vienna, Peuerbach received a master of philosophy in 1446 and a second master's degree in 1448, studying mathematics under the guidelines of Johann von Gmünden. His curriculum was composed primarily of humanities courses, as was usual at the time. His knowledge of astronomy derived from independent study, possibly from studying under followers of John von Gmünden. During his enrollment, there were no professors of astronomy at the University of Vienna. However, under his tutelage astronomic studies emerged at the University of Vienna throughout the 15th and 16th centuries.

Peuerbach observed the occultation of Jupiter by the Moon in 1451, signifying the beginning of his personal astronomy career. After this point Peuerbach essentially devoted his life to astronomy, developing tools and theories, and collaborating with his pupil Regiomontanus (Johannes Müller von Königsberg) to make astrology more digestible to common people. Majority of Georg's astrological discoveries were made in the last ten years of his life.

Georg Peuerbach traveled through central and southern Europe, most notably in Italy, giving lectures on astronomy. His lectures led to offers of professorships at several universities, including those at Bologna and Padua. During this time he also met Italian astronomer Giovanni Bianchini of Ferrara, perhaps the leading astronomer at the time, and the Cardinal Nicholas of Cusa. He returned to the University of Vienna in 1453, earned his Masters of Arts, and began lecturing on Latin poetry. He is often credited as a leader in reviving classical Greek and Roman literature in arts and sciences.

Peuerbach attended many university lectures that focused on Roman poets, which led to him playing one of the leading roles in the revitalization of classical learning introduced by Aenaes Silvius Piccolomini. Peuerbach eventually followed the advice of the court astrologer to Emperor Friedrich III in Wiener-Nestadt, Johann Nihil, and took the position of court astrologer to the king of Hungary. After being court astrologer for a few years, Peuerbach eventually went on to become imperial astrologer.

While at Vienna in 1454, Peuerbach taught planetary motion to students at the university. Peuerbach's lectures were based on Ptolemaic teachings and became so famous that from 1472 they were printed under the title ‘Theoricae Novae Planetarum‘.

In 1454 Peuerbach was appointed court astrologer to King Ladislas V of Bohemia and Hungary. It was in this capacity that Peuerbach first met Ladislas' cousin Frederick who was then serving as guardian to the 14-year-old king and who would later become Frederick III, Holy Roman Emperor. Ladislas resided primarily in Prague and Vienna, allowing Peuerbach to maintain his position at the University of Vienna. During this time Peuerbach met Regiomontanus, who was then a student at the university. After Regiomontanus graduated in 1452 at the age of 15, he began collaborating extensively with Peuerbach in his astronomical work. In 1457, following the assassination of two notable political figures, Ladislas fled Vienna and died in 1458. Peurbach did not receive an appointment from either of Ladislas' two successors. However he was asked to be the Astronomus caesaris for Emperor Frederick III, which is the position he held until his death.

Georg von Peuerbach died on 8 April 1461. His work set the path for future scholars, scientists, and astronomers for years to come; Peurbach’s early death was a serious loss to the progress of astronomy, although Regiomontanus, his successor, was able to continue his work.

== Work ==
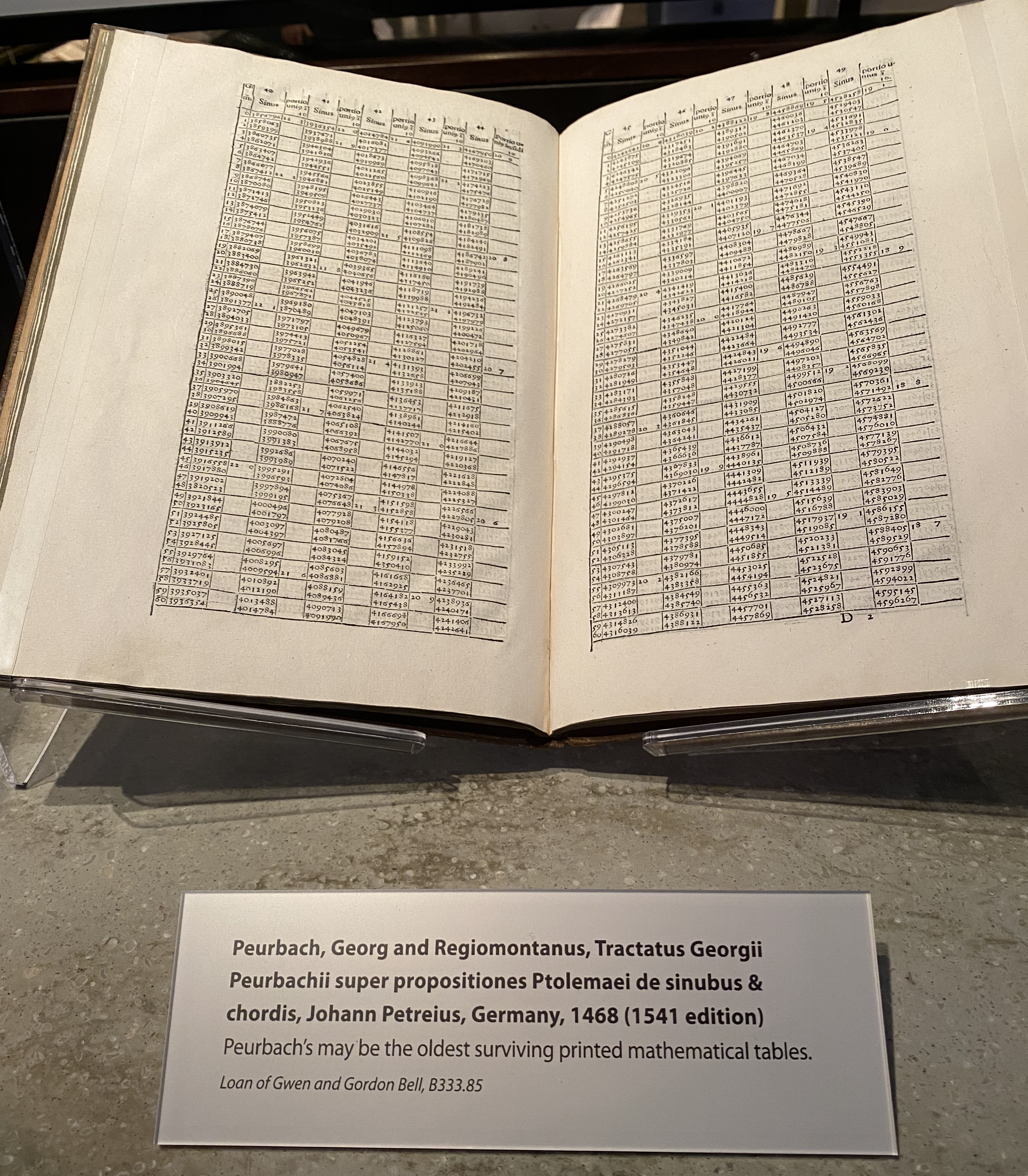
Page from Peurbach's sine table

Peuerbach is best-known for his work Theoricae Novae Planetarum, written in 1454, and published by his disciple Regiomontanus in 1472. Theoricae Novae Planetarum presented a version of Claudius Ptolemy geocentric system in a more colloquial and comprehensible way. Based on a series of Peuerbach's lectures at Bürgerschule in Vienna that were transcribed by Regiomontanus. The book introduced the "New Planetary Theory of Georg von Peuerbach" based on the already successful Ptolemaic system, this new theory presented the physical realities of eccentric planetary spheres. In his model of the sun Peuerbach removed simple eccentric shells and added partial orbs, some of which were eccentric and some concentric to the center of the world. Similar models for the planets replaced the body of the sun with an epicycle sphere carrying each planet.

Peuerbach's ideas replaced Theorica Planetarum Communis, a work credited to Gerardus Cremonensis, as the standard university text on astronomy and was studied by many influential astronomers including Nicolaus Copernicus and Johannes Kepler.

In 1457 Peuerbach observed an eclipse and noted that it had occurred 8 minutes earlier than had been predicted by the Alphonsine Tables, the best available astronomical tables at the time. He then computed his own set of eclipse tables, the Tabulae Eclipsium. Widely read in manuscript form beginning around 1459 and formally published in 1514, these tables remained highly influential for many years.

Peuerbach wrote various papers on practical mathematics and constructed various astronomical instruments. Most notably, he computed sine tables based on techniques developed by Islamicate mathematicians. Peuerbach's work was instrumental in establishing a more modern understanding of mathematics.

In 1460, Cardinal Johannes Bessarion, while visiting Frederick's court seeking assistance in a crusade to reclaim Constantinople from the Turks, proposed that Peuerbach and Regiomontanus create a new translation of Ptolemy's Almagest from the original Greek. Bessarion thought that a shorter and more clearly written version of the work would make a suitable teaching text. Peuerbach accepted the task and worked on it with Regiomontanus until his death in 1461, at which time 6 volumes had been completed. Regiomontanus completed the project, and the final version containing 13 volumes was published in 1496.

== Accomplishments ==
- In February 1453, Georg Von Peuerbach was awarded with the Magister Artium in Vienna.
- Peuerbach began the translation of Ptolemy's Almagest from Greek into Latin, a task which was completed and published by his student Regiomontanus in 1496.
- Expanded the Astronomy program at the University of Vienna.
- Influenced many other European astrological and astronomical discoveries with his observations and ideologies

== Legacy ==
Georg von Peuerbach's work outlives him because of his ability to communicate astronomy, mathematics and art. His contributions simplified seeming difficult ideas, making them more digestible and inspiring critical thought. Through his tutelage he was able to create an astronomy program at his alma mater, further expanding the understanding of astronomy.

Peuerbach's and Regiomontanus's contribution expanded the European understanding of astronomy by translating Ptolemy's Almagest in a book that later influenced Nicolaus Copernicus. Though the work was completed after Peuerbach's death in 1461, Regiomontanus carried on with the task and eventually the Epitome of the Almagest was published in 1496, nearly 35 years after his teacher’s death, and 20 years after his own (Regiomontanus died in 1476). This book would go on to be an important reference for Nicholas Copernicus for the creation of his book De Revolutionibus.

Ironically Nicolaus Copernicus's work, and later Sir Issac Newton's, disproved many of the ideas that Peuerbach supported while defending the Ptolemaic system, nonetheless his advancement in technology and theory help modernize the study of astronomy.

Peuerbach's input in Regiomontanus's trigonometric tables was used by future astronomers in the coming century. Though a fair amount of Peuerbach's work is believed to have circulated in academia, his full observations were only published by Johann Schöner nearly a century after Peuerbach's death. His Theoricae Novae Planetarum would be released in numerous editions between 1472 and 1596, with additions by scholars such as Regiomontanus, Peter Apian, Erasmus Reinhold, and Philip Melanchthon. It is believed that by 1653, at least 56 Latin printings of the text had been published with numerous editions in other languages as well.

Peuerbach’s Theoricae Novae Planetarum became one of the most common astronomy textbooks used to train future scholars. He is credited with being instrumental in the European understanding of astronomy and the Ptolemaic system. The descriptions of the solid spheres model (common to the Ptolemaic planetary system) seen in the Theoricae Novae Planetarum would remain the accepted view of the nature of the spheres until the time of Tycho Brahe, who disproved the existence of solid spheres. The Theoricae Novae Planetarum is also credited with helping to establish much of the technical vocabulary used by astronomers through the seventeenth century.

Peuerbach is also known to have developed and distributed tables that were capable of predicting eclipses of both the sun and the moon, and this practice was continued by Regiomontanus. The manuscript, titled Tabulae Eclipsium, saw continued use, as late as Tycho Brahe near the end of the sixteenth century. He is also believed to have overseen the collection and duplication of numerous astronomical manuscripts. This culminated in the development of a scientific printing press in Nuremberg by Regiomontanus. The printing press was further used to publish astronomical works such as Peuerbach's own Theoricae Novae Planetarum, as well as the Astronomicon written by the poet Manilius

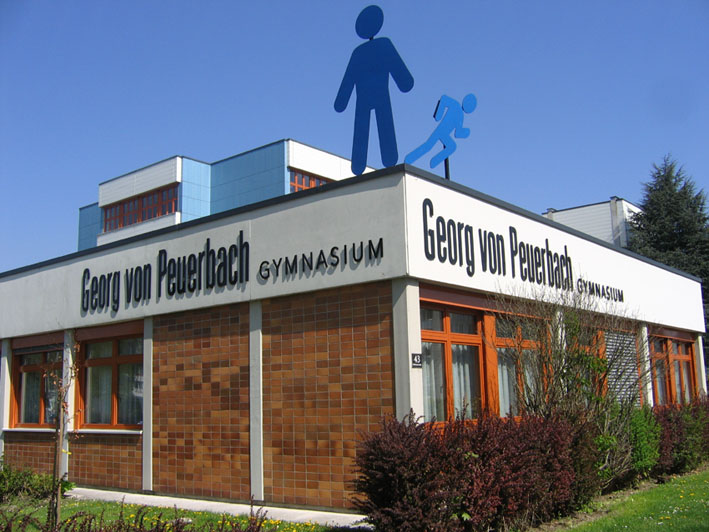
The Georg von Peuerbach Gymnasium built in 1971 in Upper Austria

== Works ==
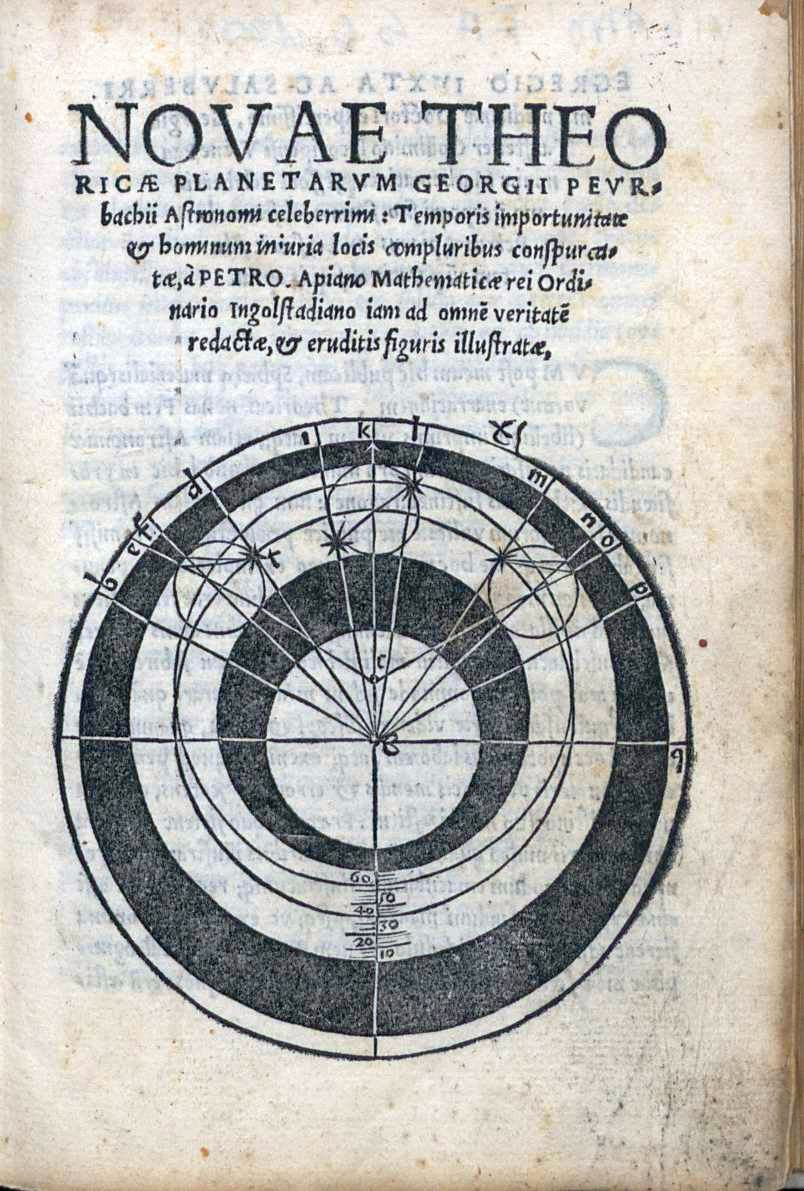
Theoricae novae planetarum, 1534

- Theoricae novae planetarum (in Latin). Venezia: Malchiorre Sessa (1.). 1534.
- Tabulae eclipsium (in Latin). 1459 treatises based on elementary arithmetic, sine tables, calculating devices, and the astronomical instruments
- Peurbach, Georg and Regiomontanus, Tractatus Georgi Peurbachii super propositiones Ptolemaei de sinubus & chordis (A treatise of George Peurbach on the propositions of Ptolemy concerning the sines and chords), Johann Petreius, Germany, 1468
