= Clairaut =

Clairaut may refer to:

- Alexis Claude Clairaut, French mathematician
  - Clairaut's equation
  - Clairaut's theorem
- Clairaut (crater), a crater on the Moon
