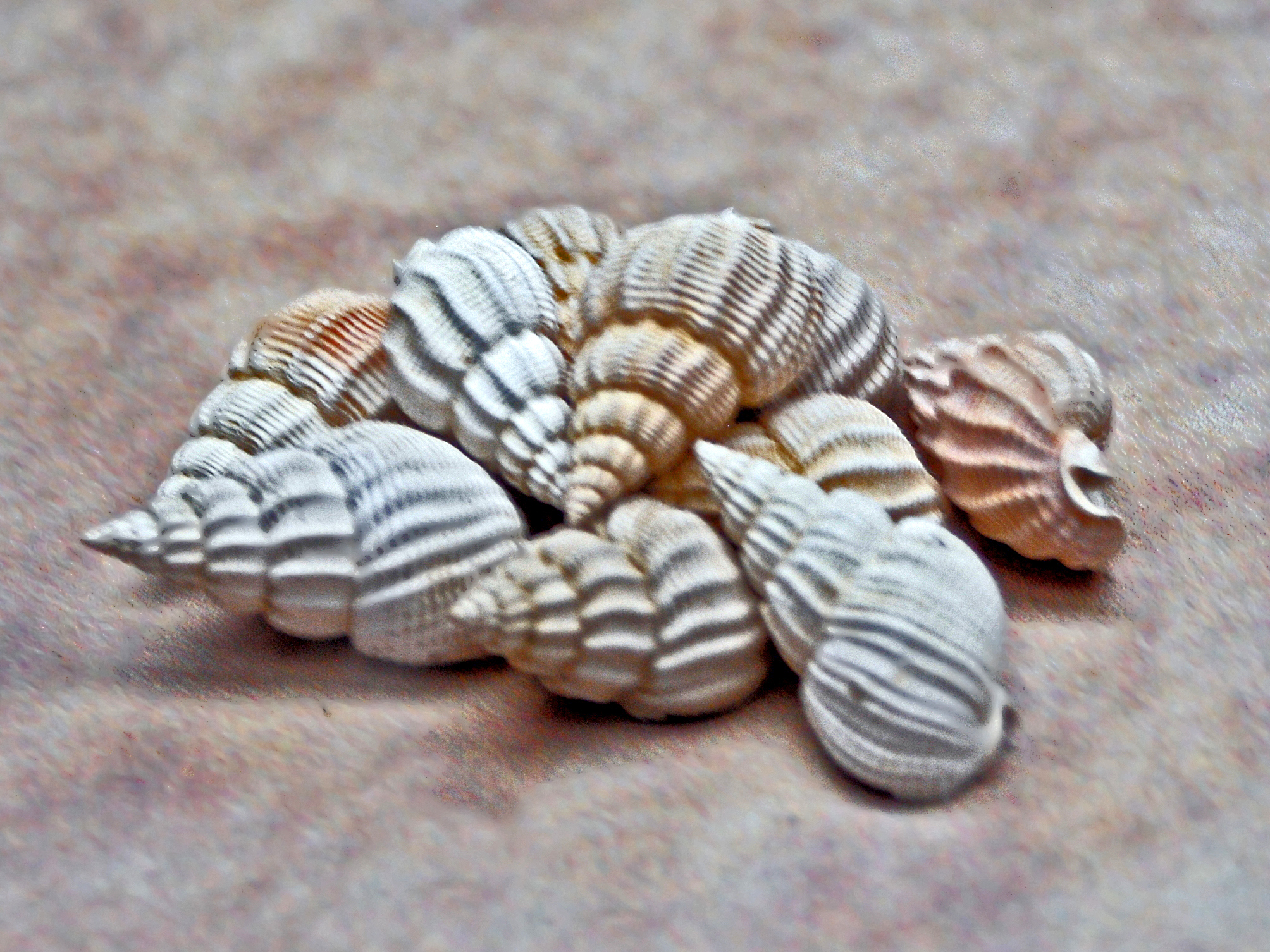
- Several fossil shells of Nassarius prysmaticus

Scientific classification
- Kingdom: Animalia
- Phylum: Mollusca
- Class: Gastropoda
- Subclass: Caenogastropoda
- Order: Neogastropoda
- Family: Nassariidae
- Genus: Nassarius
- Species: †N. prysmaticus

Binomial name
- †Nassarius prysmaticus (Brocchi 1814)

Synonyms
- Nassarius prismaticus (Brocchi, 1814); Hinia prismatica

= Nassarius prysmaticus =

Extinct species of gastropod

Nassarius prysmaticus is an extinct species of fossil sea snail, a marine gastropod molluscs in the family Nassariidae.

These sea snails have been found as fossils in the Pliocene deposits of Italy, Spain and the United Kingdom, as well as in the Miocene of Belgium, Denmark and Germany (from 11.608 to 2.588 Ma).
