= Baco (crater) =

Lunar impact crater

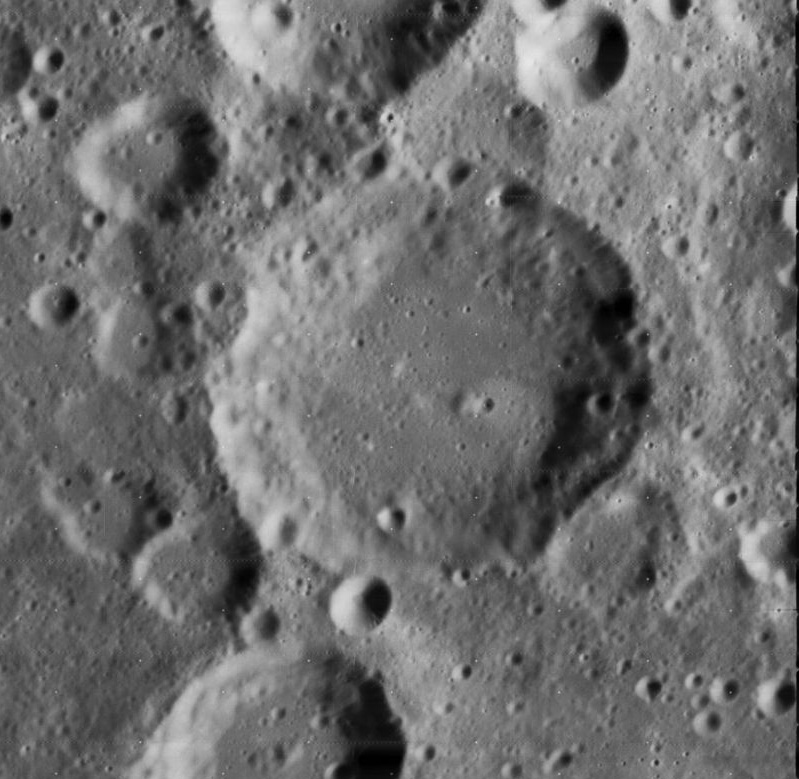
- Lunar Orbiter 4 image: Baco is at center, Baco A at bottom, and Baco B at top
- Coordinates: 51.0°S 19.1°E
- Diameter: 65.31 km (40.58 mi)
- Depth: 3.1 km
- Colongitude: 341° at sunrise
- Eponym: Roger Bacon

Baco is a lunar impact crater that lies in the rugged southern highlands on the near side of the Moon. Patrick Moore noted this crater has "lofty walls and a low central peak". The rim and inner wall has been eroded and worn by countless minor impacts since the original formation of the crater. As a result, any terraces have been worn smooth and the rim is overlaid by several tiny craterlets. The interior floor is nearly flat, with only minor ridges near the midpoint and no small craters of significance.

There are several minor craters located in the surrounding terrain, including the satellite craters Baco A just to the south and Baco B to the northwest. Further to the north is the crater Breislak, and equally distant to the northeast is Ideler. Further to the west is Cuvier, while Asclepi lies to the southeast.

Although this crater was named after the British natural philosopher and optician Roger Bacon (c. 1214–c. 1294), it was chosen by the German astronomer Johann von Mädler in 1837. Hence the crater name became modified from Bacon to Baco. Its designation was officially adopted by the International Astronomical Union in 1935.

== Satellite craters ==
By convention these features are identified on lunar maps by placing the letter on the side of the crater midpoint that is closest to Baco.

Baco	Latitude	Longitude	Diameter
A	52.8° S	20.2° E	39 km
B	49.5° S	16.6° E	43 km
C	50.8° S	14.8° E	14 km
D	51.6° S	16.4° E	8 km
E	52.9° S	16.2° E	28 km
F	50.4° S	17.7° E	6 km
G	54.4° S	17.2° E	9 km
H	51.9° S	18.9° E	6 km
J	54.7° S	19.3° E	19 km
K	53.9° S	17.6° E	29 km
L	49.5° S	16.7° E	7 km
M	49.2° S	18.0° E	7 km
N	50.8° S	16.3° E	23 km
O	52.1° S	19.9° E	9 km
P	50.8° S	19.6° E	5 km
Q	52.3° S	18.7° E	20 km
R	49.2° S	21.0° E	18 km
S	49.4° S	18.5° E	18 km
T	53.7° S	19.8° E	5 km
U	52.4° S	19.3° E	6 km
W	53.3° S	21.1° E	9 km
Z	53.0° S	15.0° E	7 km
