= Fortunio Liceti =

Italian scientist

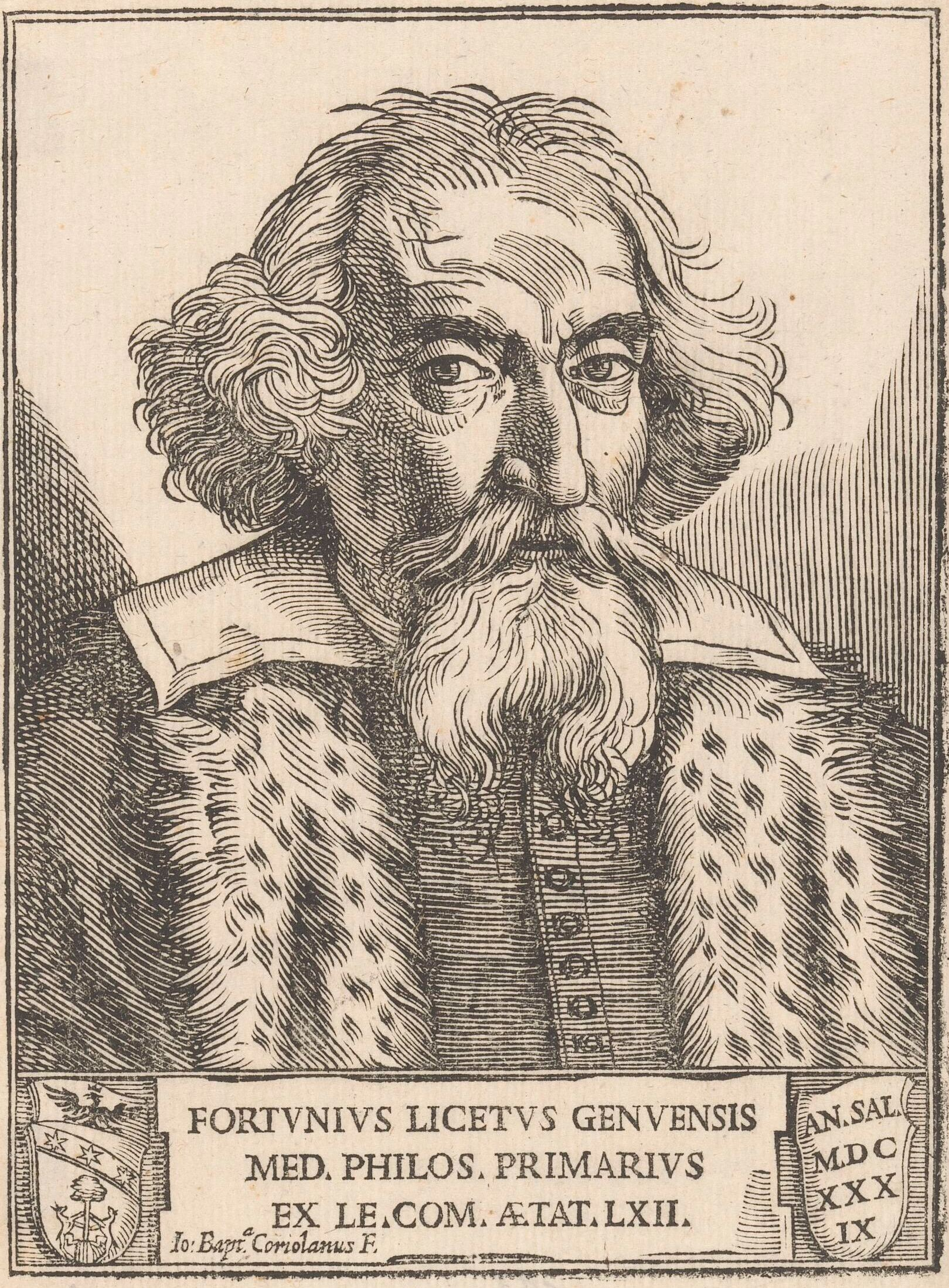
- Portrait of Fortunio Liceti by Giovanni Battista Coriolano
- Born: 3 October 1577; Rapallo, Republic of Genoa
- Died: 16 June 1657; Padua, Republic of Venice
- Resting place: Sant'Agostino, Padua
- Education: University of Bologna
- Occupations: Medical doctor, philosopher, academic
- Employers: University of Bologna; University of Padua; University of Pisa

Fortunio Liceti (Latin: Fortunius Licetus; October 3, 1577 – May 17, 1657) was an Italian physician and philosopher.

== Early life ==
He was born prematurely at Rapallo, near Genoa to Giuseppe Liceti and Maria Fini, while the family was moving from Recco. His father was a doctor and created a makeshift incubator, thereby saving Fortunio.

== Education ==
Fortunio studied with his father from 1595 until 1599, when he moved on to the University of Bologna, where he studied philosophy and medicine. There his teachers included Giovanni Costeo and Federico Pendasio, two men whom Liceti respected so much he later named his first son in their honor (Giovanni Federico Liceti). In October 1599, Giuseppe Liceti fell fatally ill and Fortunio returned to Genoa, where Giuseppe was now practicing medicine. On March 23, 1600, Liceti received his doctorate in philosophy and medicine.

== Career ==
On November 5 of that year, Liceti took a position as lecturer of logic at the University of Pisa and in 1605, he was awarded a chair in philosophy. On August 25, 1609, he was given a professorship in philosophy at the University of Padua. Liceti was elected to the Accademia dei Ricovrati in 1619 and held several offices within the group. He was denied promotion when senior colleagues died in both 1631 and 1637, so Liceti moved to the University of Bologna from 1637 to 1645, where he taught philosophy. On September 28, 1645, the University of Padua invited him to return as the first professor of theoretical medicine, the most prestigious chair in medicine, and he accepted. He held this position until his death. Throughout his life, Liceti remained committed philosophically to an Aristotelian viewpoint, although some recent scholars, such as Giuseppe Ongaro, have suggested he was not a rigid dogmatist.

Liceti died on May 17, 1657, and was buried in the church of Sant'Agostino in Padua. The church was later demolished but his grave marker, inscribed with an epitaph composed by Liceti himself, was saved and is now housed in the city's Civic Museum.

== Friendship with Galileo ==
Liceti and Galileo Galilei were colleagues at the University of Padua for nearly a year. In fact, when Liceti began working there, Galileo assisted him by loaning him a sum of money. The two remained friends after Galileo left Padua and from the period of October 22, 1610 to July 20, 1641, thirty-three letters from Liceti to Galileo survive, along with twelve from Galileo to Liceti (which would have been lost had Liceti not inserted them into his own published works).

== Works ==
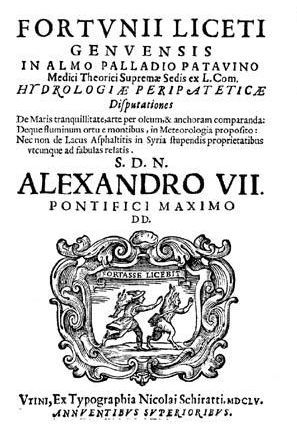
Hydrologiae peripateticae, 1655

Liceti's varied publications demonstrate his range of interests, from genetics and reproduction to gems and animals. His prodigious output once caused mathematician Bonaventura Cavalieri to write to Galileo Galilei that Liceti "makes a book a week ('esso fa un libro in una settimana')." At the end of his 1653 work Hieroglyphica (1653), Liceti included a list of 75 compositions to that point:

- Published: 53
  - Philosophica: 9
  - Philosophico-Medica: 9
  - Physico-Mathematica: 7
  - Physico-Medico-Theologica: 12
  - Philologica: 16
- Ready for the press: 19
  - Philologica: 2
  - Philosophico-Mathematico-Theologica: 8
  - Philosophica: 6
  - Medicinalia: 3
- Started: 3
  - Philosophica: 1
  - Medica: 1
  - Theologica: 1

This article follows a different division.

=== Natural Philosophy ===
Liceti's philosophical works mainly deal with natural philosophy, which he preferred to call “physiology.” In De animarum rationalium immortalitate libri quatuor, Aristotelis opinionem diligenter explicantes, published in 1629, Liceti expounded the opinions of Aristotle regarding the immortality of the soul. In the 1645 work De pietate Aristotelis erga Deum et homines, he argues that Aristotle most likely achieved eternal salvation in the afterlife.

Many of Liceti's works in this area are especially concerned with problems of generation and development. In 1602, he published De ortu animae humanae, which examines the way in which the three parts of the soul (vegetative, sensitive, and rational) come to be joined with the human fetus. In De perfecta constitutione hominis in utero liber unus, published in 1616, he further explored the topic of embryogenesis. In this work, he differed from Aristotle in arguing that, in addition to a male seed, there is also a female seed, which contributes the vegetative soul to a fetus. Furthermore, he argued that these seeds were composed of particles from all over the parents' bodies, some of which contain the shape of the embryo. Liceti then used this theory to explain the inheritance of acquired characteristics, genetic abnormalities and interspecies hybrids.

Liceti's primary work in the field of generation, and his most famous, is De monstrorum caussis, natura et differentiis, originally published in Padua in 1616 then reprinted in 1634 with lavish illustrations. Here, Liceti described and classified a variety of developmental abnormalities and, for the first time, classified these based on their morphology, not their cause. Liceti did, however, provide explanations for these abnormalities, including the narrowness of the uterus, problems with the placenta, and the adhesion of the amniotic fluid with the embryo. Liceti was thus the first to recognize that fetal diseases could lead to the malformation of offspring.

Liceti dealt with the question of spontaneous generation in his 1628 work De spontaneo viventium ortu libri quatuor, in which he argued that life could be generated from decomposing plant or animal material in which part of the vegetative or sensitive soul remained. In 1630, he published a follow-up work (De anima subiecto corpori nil tribuente, deque seminis vita et efficientia primaria in constitutione foetus) which answered the objections of some of his critics.

=== Medicine ===
Liceti published a collection of examples of long-term fasting in 1612, De his, qui diu vivunt sine alimento. His intention was to argue that humans could live a long time with little or no food; this thesis was attacked by critics (in particular the Portuguese doctor and professor at Pisa, S. Rodriguez de Castro) and so Liceti published two responses, De feriis altricis animaenemeseticae disputationes in 1631 and Athos perfossus, sive Rudens eruditus in 1636.

Other medical works include Mulctra, sive De duplici calore corporum naturalium (1634) and Pyronarcha, sive De fulminum natura deque febrium origine (1636), in which he held that a headache is the microcosmic equivalent of the macrocosmic phenomenon of lightning. Liceti further discussed the relationship between the microcosm of the human body and the macrocosm of the universe in his 1635 work De mundi et hominis analogia.

=== Astronomy ===
In his astronomical works, Liceti attempted to defend Aristotelian cosmology and geocentrism against the new ideas of heliocentrism proposed by Galileo and his followers. With the appearance of the famous comets of 1618 (which later gave rise to Galileo's work The Assayer), Liceti published a series of works arguing the Aristotelian view that comets occurred in the sphere of the upper heavens. These works included De novis astris, et cometis libri sex (1623), Controversiae de cometarum quiete, loco boreali sine occasu, parallaxi Aristotelea, sede caelesti, et exacta theoria peripatetica (1625), Ad ingenuum lectorem scholium Camelo Bulla (published as an appendix to his 1627 work De intellectu agente), De regulari motu minimaque parallaxi cometarum coelestium disputationes (1640), and De Terra unico centro motus singularum caeli particularum disputationes (also 1640). Liceti used these studies primarily to attack the views of G. C. Gloriosi (who had succeeded Galileo as chair of mathematics at the University of Padua) and Scipione Chiaramonti, both of whom published their own scathing counter-attacks on Liceti's views.

Liceti was also involved in a friendlier astronomical debate with Galileo between 1640 and 1642. In 1640, Liceti published Litheosphorus, sive De lapide Bononiensi lucem in se conceptam ab ambiente claro mox in tenebris mire conservante, a work which examined the so-called “light-bearing stone of Bologna.” This stone was a type of barite originating in Mount Paderno near Bologna. The stone had the unusual property of becoming phosphorescent during the process of calcination, but it was believed at the time that the phosphorescence was caused by the stone absorbing and then gradual releasing sunlight. Liceti used this stone as analogy for the moon, believing that the moon released light absorbed by the sun, contrary to Galileo's argument in Sidereus Nuncius that the moon's illumination is caused by the reflection of sunlight from the earth. Liceti sent a copy of his book to Galileo, who, in response, wrote a polemical letter to Prince Leopoldo de' Medici of Tuscany defending his views; this letter is the last scientific work produced by Galileo before his death. Liceti complained that the letter was circulated before he had seen it so Galileo sent a friendlier version of the letter to Liceti, who published it along with his point-by-point response in 1642 as De Lunae subobscura luce prope coniunctiones, et in eclipsibus observata.

In 1640 and 1641, respectively, Liceti published two more general works on light and illumination, De luminis natura et efficientia libri tres and De lucidis in sublimi ingenuarum exercitationum liber.

=== Gemstones and Philology ===
Liceti wrote three books on ancient gems, rings, and their hidden meaning: De anulis antiquis (1645), De lucernis antiquorum reconditis (1625, reprinted with more illustrations in 1652 and 1662), and Hieroglyphica, sive Antiqua schemata gemmarum anularium (1653).

Among his philological works is De Petrarchae cognominis ortographia, a long letter commissioned by Giacomo Filippo Tomasini and included in his 1650 work Petrarcha redivivus.

=== Miscellaneous ===
Between 1640 and 1655, Liceti published a series of eight books in which he answered questions on a variety of topics posed through letters by some of the most famous intellectuals of the day: De quaesitis per epistolas a claris viris responsa (1640), De secundo-quaesitis per epistolas a claris viris responsa (1646), De tertio-quaesitis per epistolas a claris viris responsa (1646), De motu sanguinis, origine nervorum, de quarto-quaesitis per epistolas a claris viris responsa medico-philosophica (1647), De providentia, nimbiferi gripho, de quinto-quaesitis per epistolas a claris viris responsa (1648), De sexto-quaesitis per epistolas a claris viris responsa (1648), De septimo-quaesitis, creatione Filii Dei ad intra, theologice denuo controversa per epistolas a claris viris responsa (1650), and De octavo-quaesitis in aeterna processione Verbi Divini responsa priora (1655). The second volume in this series contained his opinion on the pancreatic duct, which had just been discovered in 1642 in Padua by Johann Georg Wirsung. In the fourth volume, Liceti discussed the circulation of blood. The seventh and eighth volume deals primarily with a theological controversy Liceti engaged in with Matija Ferkić (Matteo Ferchio).

== Legacy ==
Liceti's books are well-represented in the Library of Sir Thomas Browne. It's possible that Thomas Browne, who attended Padua University circa 1629, attended lectures delivered by Liceti. Reid Barbour in his recent biography of Browne considers Liceti to have been a significant influence upon Browne's Religio Medici and Pseudodoxia Epidemica.

In 1777, Marquis Carlo Spinelli erected a marble statue of Liceti in Padua on Prato della Valle sculpted by Francesco Rizzi.

The Moon crater Licetus is named after him.

Rapallo has named a street after Liceti as well as the civic Istituto Superiore Tecnico.

== Bibliography ==
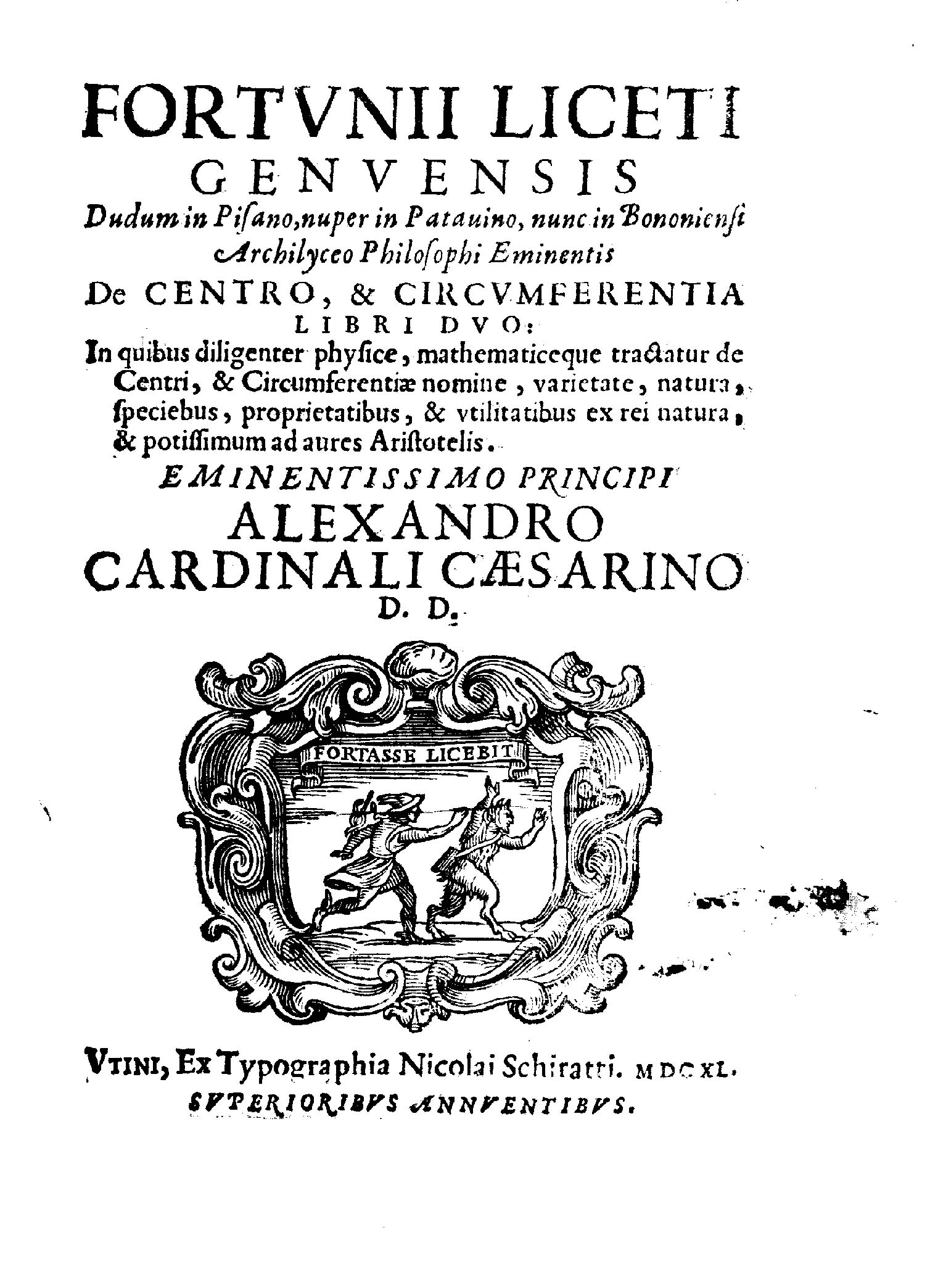
De centro et circumferentia, 1640

- De centro et circumferentia (in Latin). Vtini: Nicola Schiratti. 1640.
- De luminis natura et efficientia (in Latin). Vtini: Nicola Schiratti. 1640.
- De ortu animae humanae, Genoa 1602.
- De vita, 1607.
- De regulari motu minimaque parallaxi cometarum caelestium disputationes, 1611.
- De his, qui diu vivunt sine alimento, Padua 1612.
- De perfecta constitutione hominis in utero, Padua 1616.
- De monstrorum causis, natura et differentiis, Padua 1616—Reprinted Padua 1634, Amsterdam 1665, Padua 1668.
  - De monstris, Amsterdam: Sumptibus Andreae Frisii, 1665, OCLC 78500120, OL 24775016M—"Ex recensione Gerardi Blasii".
- De lucernis antiquorum reconditis, Venice 1621, reprinted Udine 1652, Padua 1662.
- De novis astris, et cometis, Venice 1622–1623.
- Controversiae de cometarum quiete, loco boreali sine occasu, parallaxi Aristotelea, sede caelesti, et exacta theoria peripatetica, Venice 1625.
- De intellectu agente, Padua 1627.
- De spontaneo viventium ortu (in Latin). Vicetiae: Domenico Amadio, Francesco Bolzetta. 1618.
- De animarum rationalium immortalitate libri quatuor, Aristotelis opinionem diligenter explicantes, Padua 1629.
- De anima subiecto corpori nil tribuente, deque seminis vita, et efficientia primaria in formatione foetus, Padua 1630.
- De feriis altricis animae nemeseticae disputationes, Padua 1631.
- De propriorum operum historia, Padua 1634.
- Pyronarcha sive de fulminum natura deque febrium origine, Patavii: Apud Crivellarium, ad Puteum Pictum, 1634, OCLC 81321661, OL 24832467M
- De rationalis animae varia propensione ad corpus, Padua 1634
- De mundi et hominis analogia, Udine 1635.
- Athos perfossus, sive Rudens eruditus, Padua 1636.
- Ulysses apud Circen, sive de quadruplici transformatione, Udine 1636.
- Mulctra, sive De duplici calore corporum naturalium, Udine 1636.
- De regulari motu minimaque parallaxi cometarum coelestium disputationes, Udine 1640.
- Litheosphorus, sive De lapide Bononiensi lucem in se conceptam ab ambiente claro mox in tenebris mire conservante, Udine 1640.
- De Terra unico centro motus singularum caeli particularum disputationes, Udine 1640.
- De quaesitis per epistolas a claris viris responsa, Bologna 1640.
- De centro & circumferentia, Udine 1640
- De lucidis in sublimi ingenuarum exercitationum liber, Padua: Typis Cribellianis, 1641, OL 15215372M
- De Lunae subobscura luce prope coniunctiones, et in eclipsibus observata, Udine 1642.
- De pietate Aristotelis erga Deum et homines, Udine 1645.
- De anulis antiquis, Udine 1645.
- De secundo-quaesitis per epistolas a claris viris responsa, Udine 1646.
- De tertio-quaesitis per epistolas a claris viris responsa, Udine 1646.
- De motu sanguinis, origine nervorum, de quarto-quaesitis per epistolas a claris viris responsa medico-philosophica, Udine 1647.
- De providentia, nimbiferi gripho, de quinto-quaesitis per epistolas a claris viris responsa, Udine 1648.
- De sexto-quaesitis per epistolas a claris viris responsa, Udine 1648.
- De septimo-quaesitis, creatione Filii Dei ad intra, theologice denuo controversa per epistolas a claris viris responsa, Udine 1650.
- De Petrarchae cognominis ortographia, in G.F. Tomasini, Petrarcha redivivus, Padua 1650, pp. 249–270.
- Hieroglyphica (in Latin). Patavii: Sebastiano Sardi. 1653.
- Hydrologiae peripateticae disputationes (in Latin). Vtini: Nicola Schiratti. 1655.
- Ad syringam a Theocrito Syracusio compactam et inflatam Encyclopaedia, Udine 1655.
