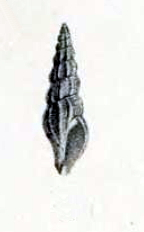
- Shell of Raphitoma columnae

Scientific classification
- Kingdom: Animalia
- Phylum: Mollusca
- Class: Gastropoda
- Subclass: Caenogastropoda
- Order: Neogastropoda
- Superfamily: Conoidea
- Family: Raphitomidae
- Genus: Raphitoma
- Species: R. columnae

Binomial name
- Raphitoma columnae (Scacchi, 1835)

Synonyms
- Bela columnae Glibert, 1960; Cythara (Raphitoma) columnae Ruggieri, 1952; Daphnella (Raphitoma) columnae Cipolla, 1914; Fusus costatus Phillippi, 1836; Fusus striatellus Bivona-Bernardi, Ant. & And. Bivona-Bernardi, 1838; Pleurotoma columnae Scacchi, 1835 (original combination); Pleurotoma (Raphitoma) columnae Seguenza, 1873

= Raphitoma columnae =

Extinct species of gastropod

Raphitoma columnae is an extinct species of sea snail, a marine gastropod mollusk in the family Raphitomidae.

== Description ==
The length of the shell reaches 23 mm, its diameter 7 mm.

Compared with Raphitoma harpula, the shell is longer, the whorls are less convex, the suture is less impressed. The body whorl is shorter and less depressed on top. The axial ribs are hardly oblique. The transverse striae are uniform and don't form nodules when crossing the ribs. The siphonal canal is straight, shorter and hardly noticed.

== Distribution ==
Fossils of this marine species were found in Miocene strata of Italy.
