= Ideler (crater) =

Crater on the Moon

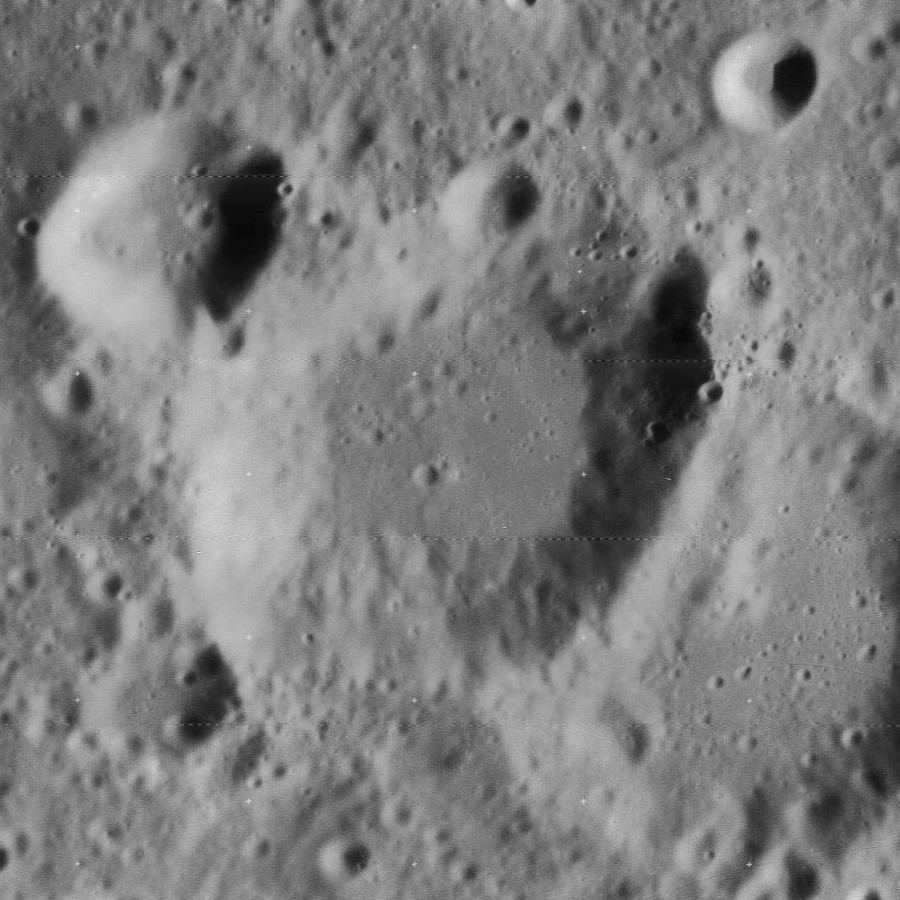
- Lunar Orbiter 4 image
- Coordinates: 49.2°S 22.3°E
- Diameter: 38 km
- Depth: 1.6 km
- Colongitude: 339° at sunrise
- Eponym: Christian L. Ideler

Ideler is a small lunar impact crater in the low southern latitudes of the Moon. This formation is visible from the Earth, but it appears somewhat foreshortened due to its location. The crater lies just to the northeast of the larger crater Baco, and west-northwest of the prominent Pitiscus. To the west-northwest of Ideler is Breislak.

This feature forms part of a nearly matched crater pair with Ideler L, which Ideler intrudes upon along its eastern flank. The smaller satellite crater Baco R is nearly attached to the opposite, western rim. The remainder of the rim is worn, with a pair of small craterlets along the northern rim and inner wall. The interior floor is nearly featureless.

It is named for the German astronomer Christian Ludwig Ideler.

== Satellite craters ==
By convention these features are identified on lunar maps by placing the letter on the side of the crater midpoint that is closest to Ideler.

Ideler	Latitude	Longitude	Diameter
A	50.1° S	22.0° E	11 km
B	50.6° S	22.3° E	11 km
C	51.2° S	23.2° E	7 km
L	49.2° S	23.6° E	36 km
M	48.8° S	25.6° E	20 km
