= Clairaut's formula =

Clairaut's formula may refer to:

- Clairaut's equation (mathematical analysis)
- Clairaut's relation (differential geometry)
- Clairaut's theorem (calculus)
- Clairaut's theorem (gravity)
