= Licetus (crater) =

Crater on the Moon

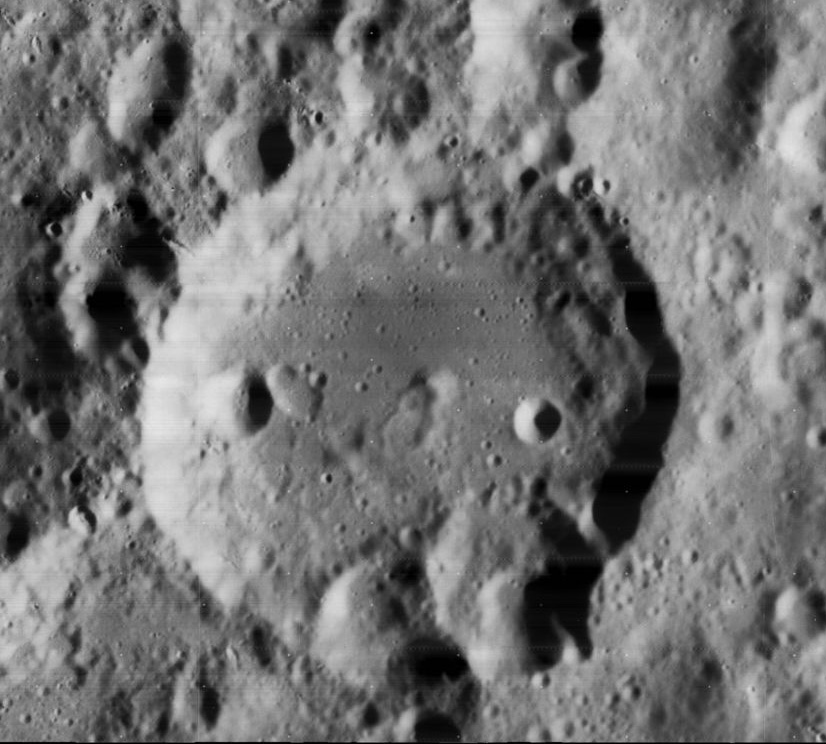
- Lunar Orbiter 4 image
- Coordinates: 47.1°S 6.7°E
- Diameter: 75 km
- Depth: 3.8 km
- Colongitude: 354° at sunrise
- Formation: Pre-Nectarian
- Eponym: Fortunio Liceti

Licetus is a lunar impact crater on the near side of the Moon, in the rugged southern highland region. It lies to the south of a walled plain named Stöfler, and is attached to the northern rim of the sub-divided crater Heraclitus. Just to the southeast is Cuvier. Licetus is 75 kilometers in diameter and 3.8 kilometers deep. It is from the Pre-Nectarian period, 4.55 to 3.92 billion years ago.

It is a worn crater formation with several craterlets across its rim and along its inner wall. The most notable of these is a small crater across the inner southeast rim, with another across the northwest rim. The rim is also especially worn along the northern end, with a cluster of tiny craterlets along the rim lip and the inner wall. The interior floor is relatively flat, with some minor ridges and slips in the southern half. There are small craterlets along the floor's west-southwest and eastern edges.

The crater is named after Fortunio Liceti, a 17th-century Italian philosopher and physicist.

== Satellite craters ==
By convention, these features are identified on lunar maps by placing the letter on the side of the crater midpoint that is closest to Licetus.

Licetus	Latitude	Longitude	Diameter
A	47.8° S	3.2° E	8 km
B	46.5° S	4.9° E	13 km
C	47.4° S	5.6° E	10 km
D	48.0° S	4.5° E	6 km
E	44.7° S	1.9° E	19 km
F	46.0° S	1.0° E	32 km
G	43.8° S	1.9° E	11 km
H	45.9° S	3.1° E	10 km
J	44.2° S	3.2° E	12 km
K	45.5° S	0.0° E	6 km
L	47.2° S	1.1° E	5 km
M	46.8° S	1.9° E	9 km
N	45.5° S	2.2° E	9 km
P	47.6° S	2.4° E	21 km
Q	47.2° S	9.7° E	8 km
R	45.1° S	3.9° E	7 km
S	45.2° S	8.2° E	11 km
T	45.8° S	6.7° E	7 km
U	46.9° S	7.4° E	7 km
W	45.9° S	8.5° E	7 km
