= Barocius (crater) =

Lunar impact crater

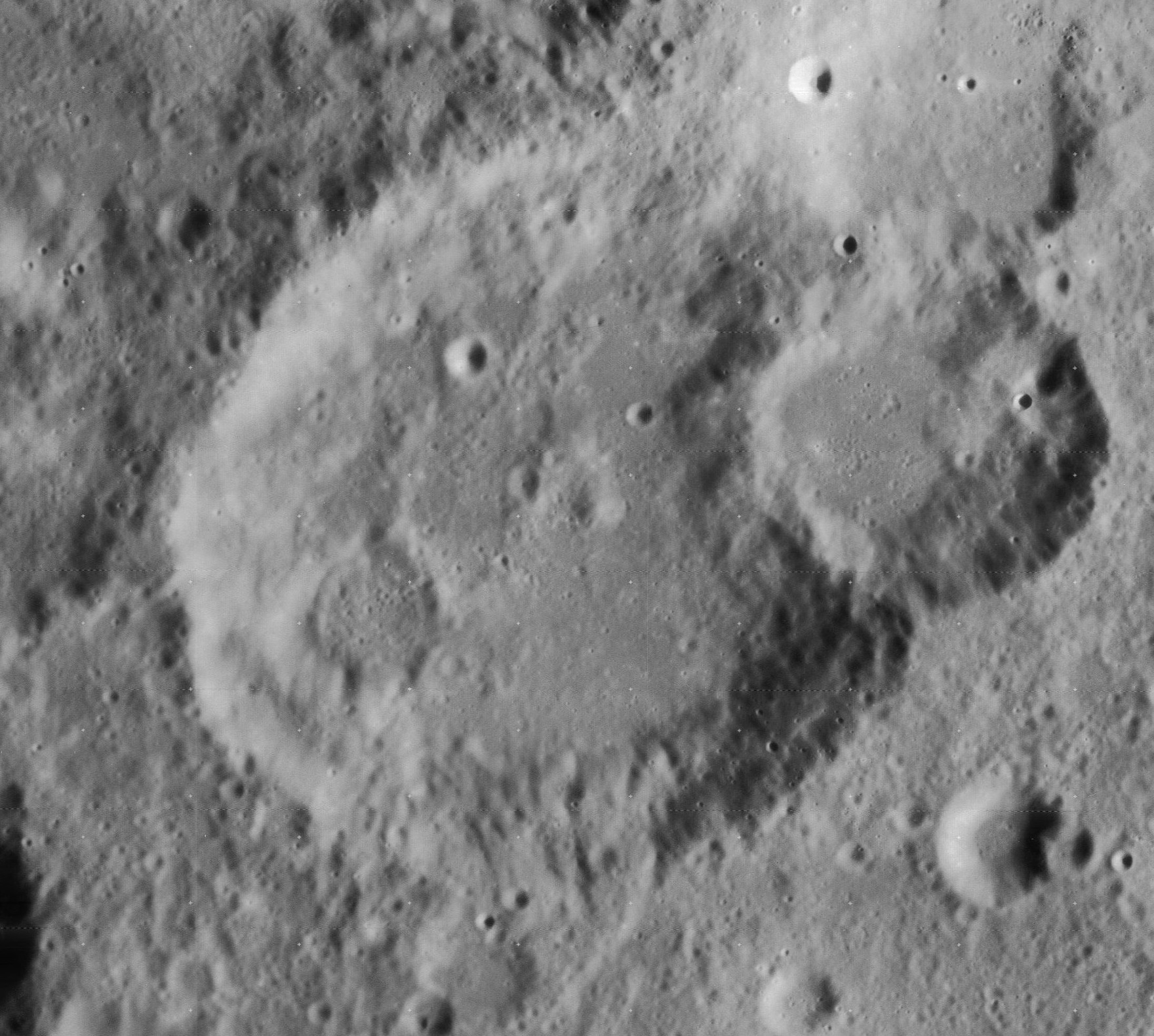
- Lunar Orbiter 4 image
- Coordinates: 44.98°S 16.81°E
- Diameter: 82.72 km (51.40 mi)
- Depth: 3.5 km (2.2 mi)
- Colongitude: 345° at sunrise
- Eponym: Francesco Barozzi

Barocius is an ancient lunar impact crater that is located in the rugged southern highlands of the Moon. It lies just to the southeast of the large crater Maurolycus. British amateur astronomer Patrick Moore described it as, "50 miles across, whose high walls are broken in the northeast by two considerable craters". To the southwest of Barocius is Clairaut, and to the south-southeast lies Breislak.

The rim of Barocius has been worn and eroded by countless subsequent impacts. Of these the most notable is Barocius B which lies across the northeast rim, and intrudes into Barocius C. There is a remnant of a crater, Barocius W, that lies just inside the southwest interior wall. On the interior floor is a low central peak offset to the north of the floor midpoint.

This crater was named after Italian mathematician Francesco Barozzi (1537-1604). Its designation was officially adopted by the International Astronomical Union in 1935. The name was introduced into lunar nomenclature by Italian astronomer Giovanni Riccioli in 1651.

== Satellite craters ==
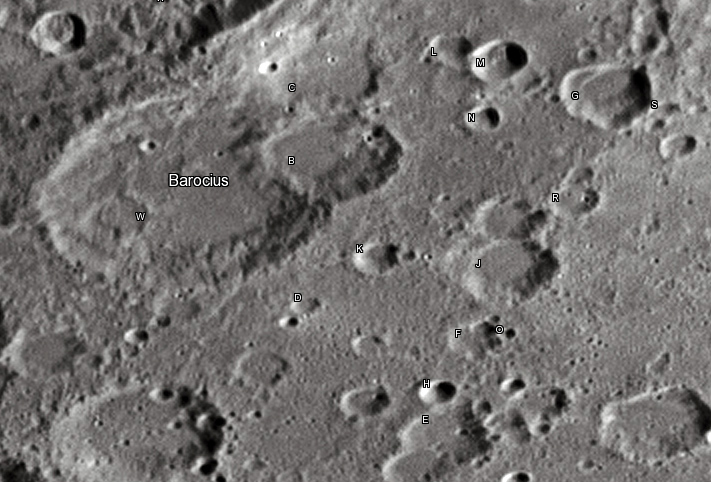
Barocius crater and its satellite craters taken from Earth in 2012 at the University of Hertfordshire's Bayfordbury Observatory with the telescopes Meade LX200 14" and Lumenera Skynyx 2-1

By convention these features are identified on lunar maps by placing the letter on the side of the crater midpoint that is closest to Barocius.

Barocius	Coordinates	Diameter
B	44.13°S 18.29°E	36.6 km
C	43.11°S 17.48°E	35.8 km
D	46.06°S 19.18°E	8.7 km
E	47.24°S 22.15°E	23.6 km
EC	48.22°S 22.49°E	7.7 km
F	45.92°S 21.60°E	15.4 km
G	42.52°S 21.03°E	27.6 km
H	46.71°S 21.63°E	10.6 km
J	44.97°S 21.41°E	27.2 km
K	45.22°S 19.63°E	13.6 km
L	42.50°S 18.81°E	13.0 km
M	42.45°S 19.48°E	15.8 km
N	43.20°S 19.76°E	10.1 km
O	45.75°S 21.93°E	5.4 km
R	43.91°S 21.53°E	14.3 km
S	42.50°S 21.82°E	8.3 km
W	45.68°S 16.21°E	18.9 km

The ejecta of Barocius M appears slightly darker than is typical for a lunar highland surface. This may be due to an enhancement of iron oxide (FeO).
