= Breislak (crater) =

Lunar impact crater

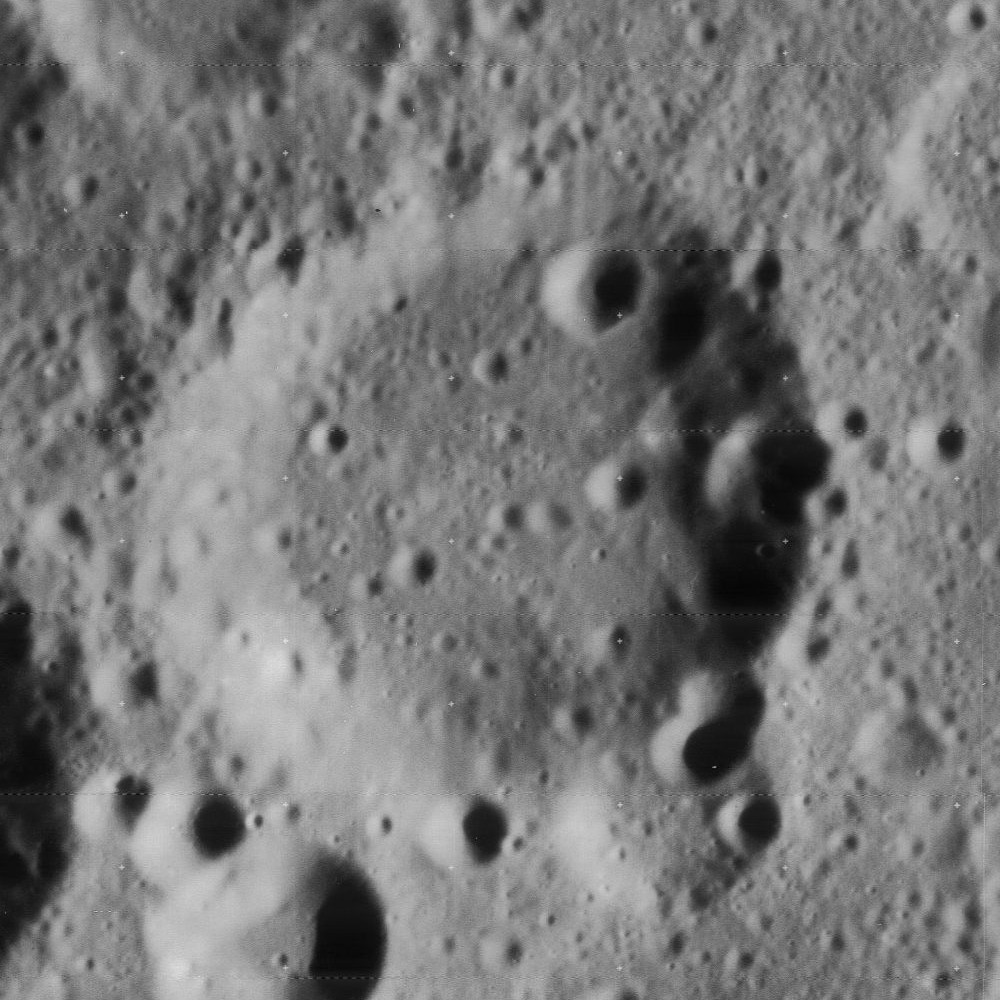
- Lunar Orbiter 4 image
- Coordinates: 48.2°S 18.3°E
- Diameter: 48.64 km (30.22 mi)
- Depth: 2.6 km (1.6 mi)
- Colongitude: 342° at sunrise
- Eponym: Scipione Breislak

Breislak is a lunar impact crater that lies within one crater diameter north-northwest of the crater Baco, in the southern part of the Moon. To the north-northwest is the crater Barocius, and to the west lies Clairaut.

The rim of Breislak has been heavily worn by subsequent impacts, and several small craterlets lie along the outer wall. One of these craters has cut a notch in the southeast wall, and there are craterlets to the northeast and southwest of this break. A small crater lies on the inner face of the northern wall. The inner surface is roughly level, but pock-marked by several tiny craterlets.

This formation is named after Italian chemist, geologist, and mathematician Scipione Breislak (1748-1826). His name was introduced into lunar nomenclature by Johann F. J. Schmidt in 1878. Its designation was officially adopted by the International Astronomical Union in 1935.

== Satellite craters ==
By convention these features are identified on lunar maps by placing the letter on the side of the crater midpoint that is closest to Breislak.

Breislak	Latitude	Longitude	Diameter
A	47.0° S	17.4° E	7 km
B	47.6° S	18.1° E	7 km
C	48.9° S	18.8° E	6 km
D	48.0° S	18.7° E	5 km
E	47.7° S	19.1° E	8 km
F	48.4° S	19.4° E	7 km
G	46.9° S	19.1° E	16 km
