= Raphitoma harpula =

Scientific classification
- Kingdom: Animalia
- Phylum: Mollusca
- Class: Gastropoda
- Subclass: Caenogastropoda
- Order: Neogastropoda
- Superfamily: Conoidea
- Family: Raphitomidae
- Genus: Raphitoma
- Species: †R. harpula

Binomial name
- †Raphitoma harpula (G.B. Brocchi, 1814 )

Synonyms
- Murex (Fusus) harpula Brocchi, 1814 (original description); Fusus harpulus Risso, 1826; Pleurotoma harpula De Serres, 1829; Pleurotoma bivonae Bellardi, 1842; Fusus pentagonus d'Orbigny, 1852; Fusus subharpulus d'Orbigny, 1852; Pleurotoma philippi Conti, 1864; Mangelia harpula Foresti, 1868

Extinct species of gastropod

Raphitoma harpula is an extinct species of sea snail, a marine gastropod mollusk in the family Raphitomidae.

It was named Raphitoma harpula by Bellardi in 1847 .

== Description ==
The length of the shell reaches 23 mm. Its diameter is 8 mm.

The very slender, fusiform, turriculate shell has a high spire and a pointed apex. The whorls are short, numerous and convex. The body whorl measures 2/5 of the total length. The sutures are impressed. The whorls contain 10–12 axial, hardly oblique ribs. They are narrow, prominent and compressed. The transverse striae are minute and then again obsolete between the interstices of the axial ribs. The columella is somewhat depressed backwards and slightly twisted. The siphonal canal is short and recurved to the right.

== Distribution ==
Fossils of this marine species were found in Miocene strata of Emilia-Romagna, Italy.
