= Museo Civico di Bassano =

Museum in Bassano del Grappa, Veneto, Italy

Coordinates: 45.7664°N 11.7352°E

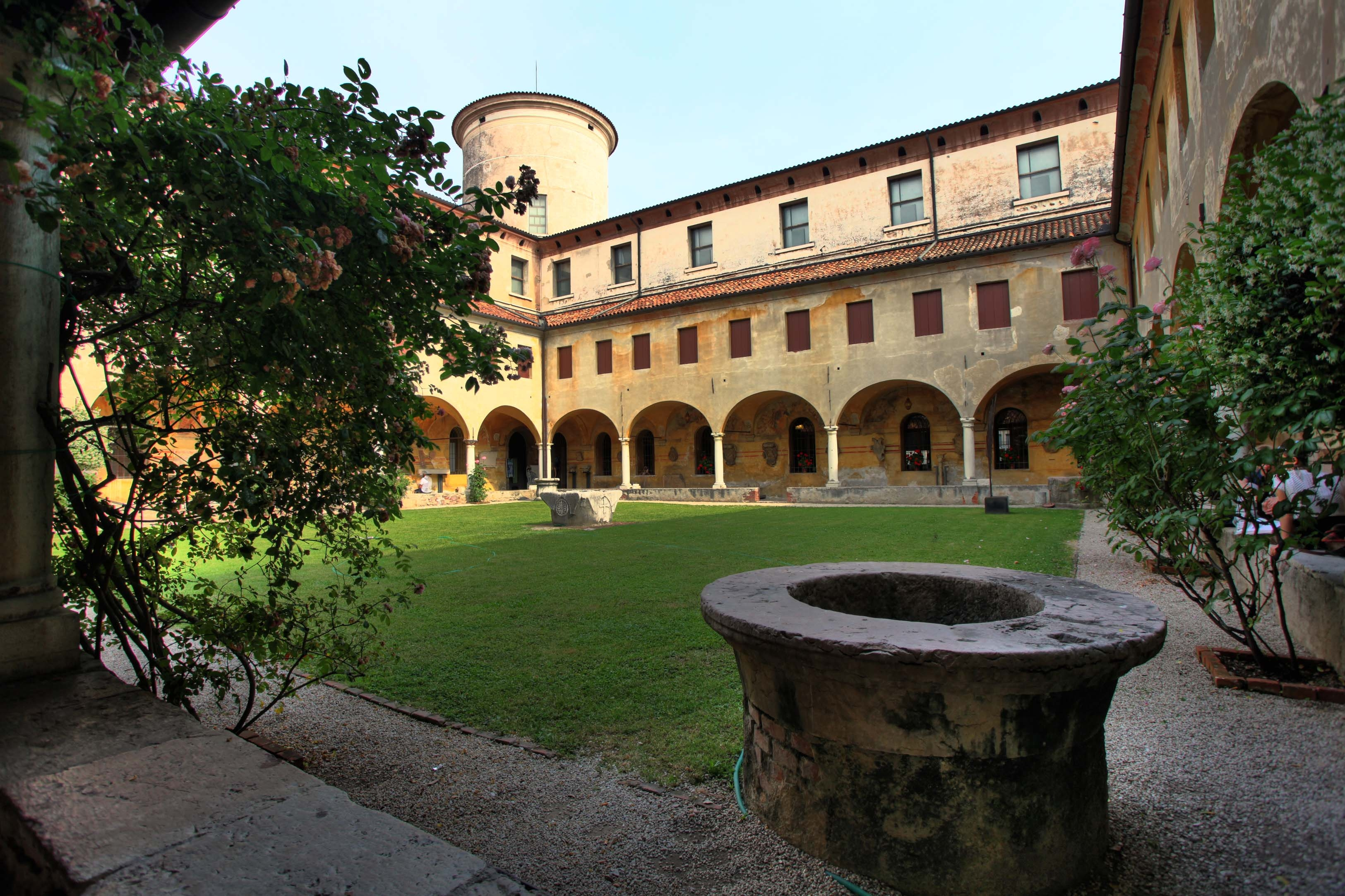
The Cloister at the entrance of the Civic Museum of Bassano del Grappa

The Museo Civico di Bassano del Grappa is the town art and architecture museum located on Piazza Garibaldi #34 in Bassano del Grappa, in the Vicenza province of the region of the Veneto, in northern Italy. It is housed in a former Franciscan convent.

== History ==
In the first half of the 19th century, artworks from various suppressed religious institutions became the property of the commune. In 1831, the first series of painters were displayed for the public in rooms surrounding the Monastery of San Francesco cloister. In 1840, these were joined by paintings from the City Hall's Sala del Consiglio and collections of Natural History specimens and books donated by the amateur naturalist Giovanni Battista Brocchi.

The museum 1978 received a donation of an archeologic collection from the professor Virgilio Chini. The collection includes ceramic vases from the Italian and Greco-Roman towns from the peninsula and abroad.

The Pinacoteca or picture gallery now displays over 500 works, including a large collection of works by and about Jacopo Da Ponte and his studio. The Sezione Canoviana, dedicated to the 19th-century sculptor Antonio Canova, has drawings, designs, letters, sketches, plaster specimens, and a unique collection of monocromi, all related to the artist.

Under the Fondazione CariVerona Arte antica e contemporanea (2006-2007), the museum has begun to sponsor exhibitions of contemporary artists. On 16 September 2017, it sponsored an exhibition about the photographer Robert Capa.
