= Scipione Breislak =

Italian geologist (1748–1826)

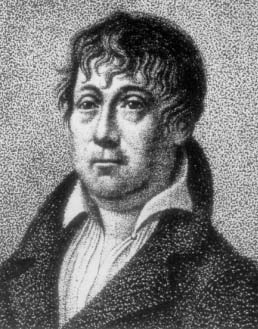
Scipione Breislack

Scipione Breislak (1748 – 15 February 1826), Italian geologist of Swedish parentage, was born in Rome in 1748. He distinguished himself as a professor of mathematical and mechanical philosophy in the college of Ragusa; but after residing there for several years he returned to his native city, where he became a professor in the Collegio Nazareno, and began to form the fine mineralogical collection in that institution.

His leisure was dedicated to geological researches in the papal states. His account of the aluminous district of Tolfa and adjacent hills, published in 1786, gained for him the notice of the king of Naples, who invited him to inspect the, mines and similar works in that kingdom, and appointed him professor of mineralogy to the royal artillery.

The vast works for the refining of sulfur in the volcanic district of Solfatara were erected under his direction. He afterwards made many journeys through the ancient Campania to illustrate its geology, and published in 1798 his Topografia fisica della Campania, which contains the results of much accurate observation. Breislak was a pioneer in the collection and analysis of volcanic gas. Breislak also published an essay on the physical condition of the seven hills of Rome, which he regarded as the remains of a local volcano, an opinion shown to be erroneous by the later researches of Giovanni Battista Brocchi.

The political convulsions of Italy in 1799 brought Breislak to Paris, where he remained until 1802, when, being appointed inspector of the saltpetre and powder manufactories near Milan, he removed to that city. The mineral breislakite was named after him. He died on 15 February 1826. His other publications include: Introduzione alla geologia (1811, French edition 1812); Trait sur la structure extrieure du globe, 3 vols. and atlas (Milan, 1818, 1822); Descrizione geologica della provincia di Milano (1822).

Breislak crater on the Moon was named after him in 1935.
