= Heraclitus (crater) =

Crater on the Moon

- Coordinates: 49.2°S 6.2°E
- Diameter: 90 km
- Depth: 3.8 km
- Colongitude: 355° at sunrise
- Eponym: Heraclitus

Heraclitus is a complex lunar impact crater that lies in the rugged southern highlands of the Moon. The crater Licetus forms the northern end of the formation. Just to the east is Cuvier, and due south is Lilius. Just to the west of Heraclitus is the small satellite crater Heraclitus K, to the south of which is a pair of larger overlapping craters, Lilius E and Lilius D.

The entire formation is heavily worn, with features smoothed down by a long history of impacts. Heraclitus is a complex formation composed of three sections divided by a triple-armed interior ridge. Of the three sections, the most eroded and irregular is at the eastern end where the outer rim forms a low ridge that joins to Cuvier.

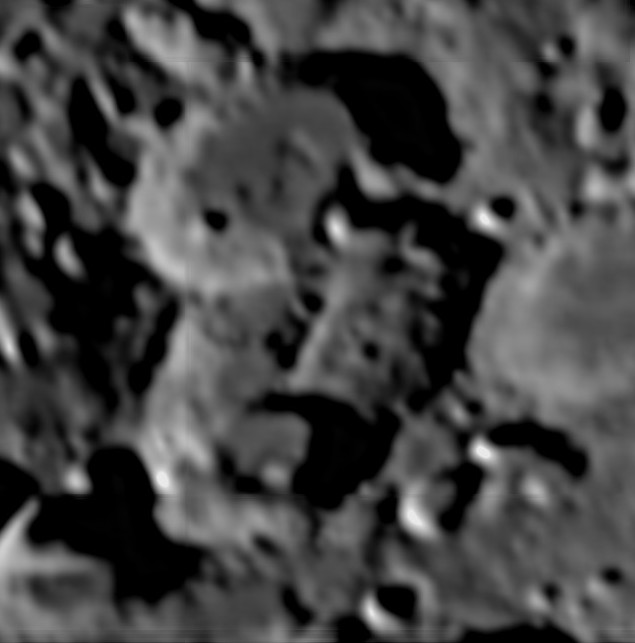
The crater Heraclitus with Licetus on its northern rim

The circular southwest end is the most intact section, forming the circular satellite crater Heraclitus D, which is attached to the other two sections along the northeast rim. There are a pair of ghost-crater rims on the floor, and a low ridge in the southwest. The crater is 90 kilometers in diameter and 3.8 kilometers deep. It may be from the Pre-Imbrian period, which lasted from 4.55 to 3.85 billion years ago.

It is named after the 6th-century BC Greek philosopher Heraclitus.

== Satellite craters ==
By convention these features are identified on lunar maps by placing the letter on the side of the crater midpoint that is closest to Heraclitus.

Heraclitus	Latitude	Longitude	Diameter
A	49.3° S	4.7° E	6 km
C	48.8° S	6.3° E	7 km
D	50.4° S	5.2° E	52 km
E	49.7° S	6.7° E	7 km
K	49.5° S	3.5° E	17 km
