= Francesco Barozzi =

Italian mathematician, astronomer and humanist (1537–1604)

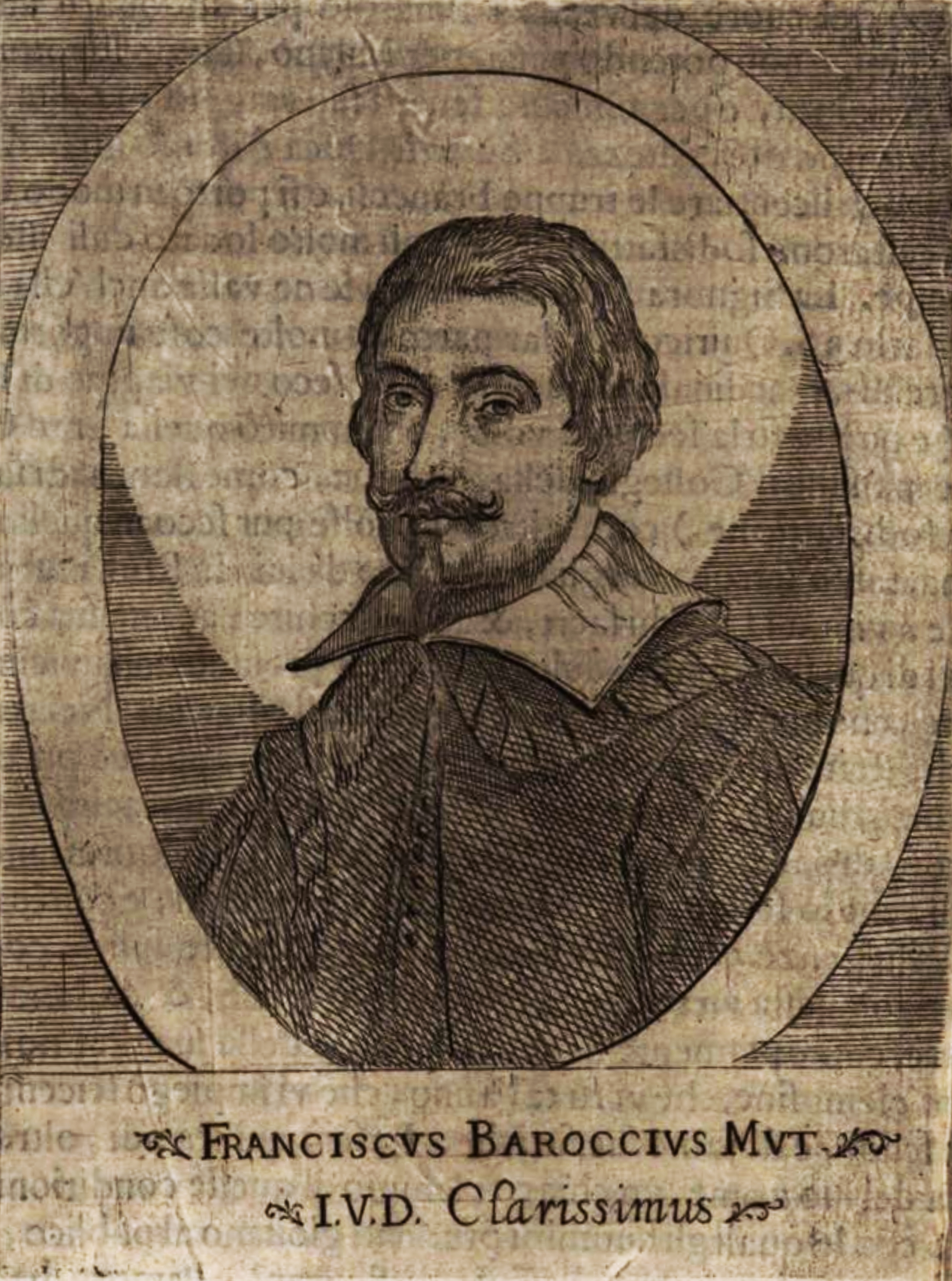
- Born: 9 August 1537; Candia, Kingdom of Candia, Republic of Venice (now Heraclion, Greece)
- Died: 23 November 1604 (aged 67); Venice, Republic of Venice (now Venice, Italy)
- Education: University of Padua
- Scientific career
- Fields: mathematics, astronomy

Francesco Barozzi (9 August 1537 – 23 November 1604), in Latin Franciscus Barocius, was an Italian mathematician, astronomer and humanist.

== Life ==
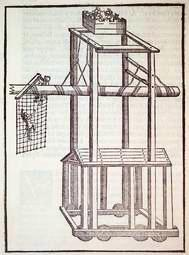
A siege machine from Barozzi's Heronis mechanici liber (1572).

Barozzi was born on the island of Crete, at Candia (now Heraklion), at the time a Venetian possession. He was the son of Iacopo Barozzi, a Venetian nobleman, and Fiordiligi Dorro. Barozzi was educated at Padua, and studied mathematics at the University of Padua. The estate on Crete, inherited from his father, yielded him an income of 4,000 ducats, though he seems to have lived in Venice for most of his life. He was thus able to function as an independent scholar, and does not appear to have held any academic posts, although he did lecture on the De sphaera of Sacrobosco at the University of Padua in 1559.

Barozzi translated many works of the ancients, including Proclus’s edition of Euclid's Elements (published in Venice in 1560), as well as mathematical works by Hero, Pappus of Alexandria, and Archimedes.

== Mathematics ==
Barozzi helped in the general reappraisal of the geometry of Euclid, and corresponded with numerous mathematicians, including the German Jesuit Christopher Clavius. His original works include Cosmographia in quatuor libros distributa summo ordine, miraque facilitate, ac brevitate ad magnam Ptolemaei mathematicam constructionem, ad universamque astrologiam institutens (1585), which he dedicated to the Duke of Urbino. This work concerns the cosmography and mathematical systems of Ptolemy. Barozzi also discussed 13 ways of drawing a parallel line in his Admirandum illud geometricum problema tredecim modis demonstratum quod docet duas lineas in eodem plano designare, quae nunquam invicem coincidant, etiam si in infinitum protrahantur: et quanto longius producuntur, tanto sibiinuicem propiores euadant (1586).

In his Opusculum: in quo una Oratio et due Questiones, altera de Certitude et altera de Medietate Mathematicarum continentur, Barozzi stressed that "the certitude of mathematics is contained in the syntactic rigor of demonstrations." Barozzi dedicated this work to Daniele Barbaro.

== Other works ==
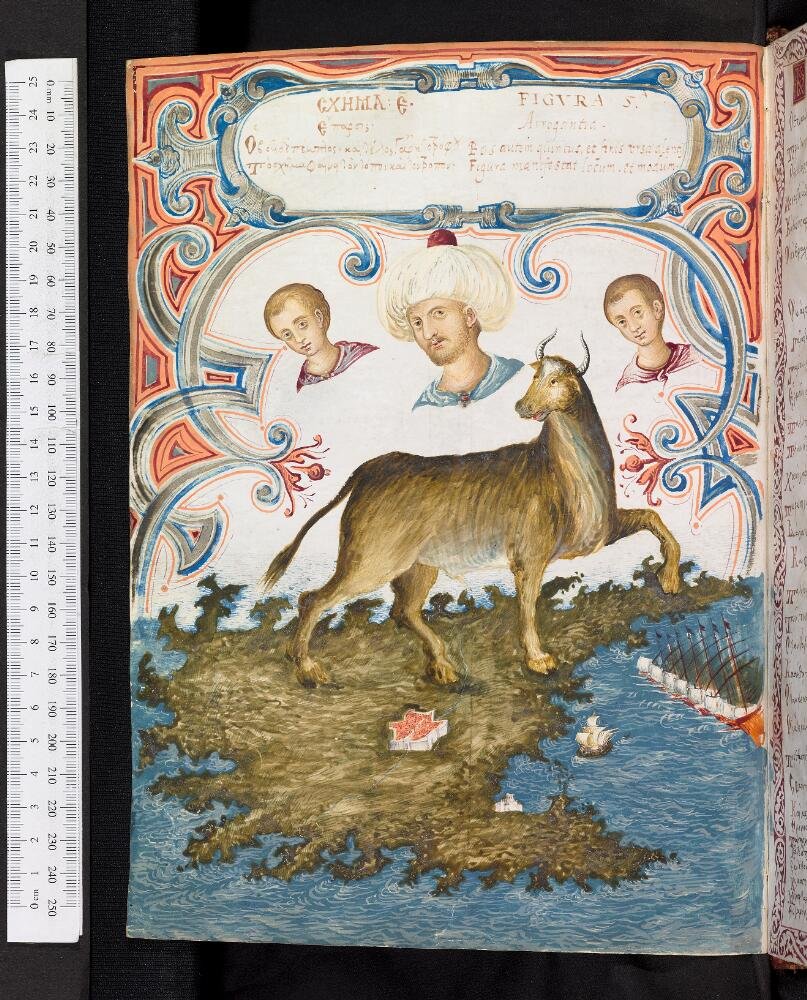
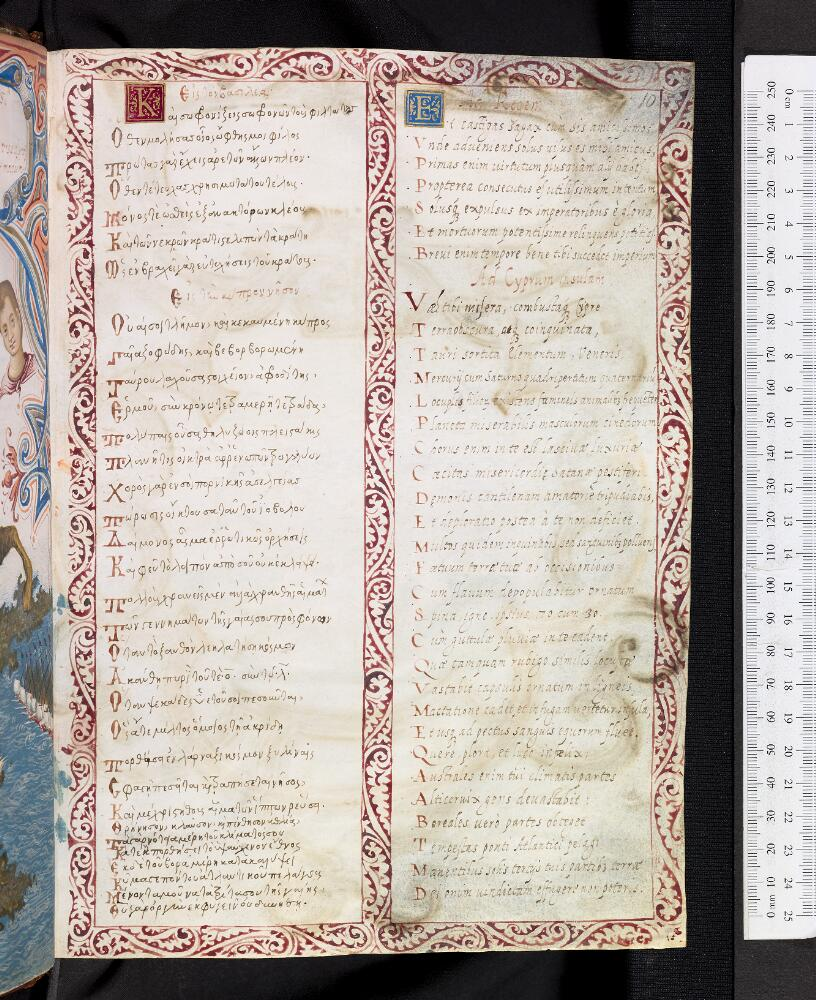
Pages from the Oracula Leonis

He also wrote Rythmomachia (1572), which he dedicated to Camille Paleotti, a Senator of Bologna, a work that is based on the mathematical game of the same name, also known as "The Philosophers' Game."

As an antiquarian, he copied many Greek inscriptions on Crete. His collection of inscriptions was later inherited by his nephew Iacopo Barozzi (1562–1617), who edited and expanded it. This collection was later acquired in 1629 by the University of Oxford. They are wide-ranging in date and subject matter and can still be found in the Bodleian Library.

He studies Epistemology, discusses the mathematical proofs and the degree of certainty of each one, applying the principles of Aristotelian theory of demonstrative science. Insert Gnomonics among the disciplines within Astronomy, his intent is to safeguard the autonomy of Astronomy.

The Greek Nikolaos Panagiotakis, writes that he was the only one of the Venetian nobles who contributed to the Cretan Renaissance, bringing Crete on the spiritual currents of Europe.

== Charges of sorcery ==
Barozzi was accused of being a sorcerer, a charge that he did not help refute by publishing his Pronostico Universale di tutto il mondo (Bologna, 1566), a collection of the prophecies of Nostradamus for the years 1565–1570. He also published a special edition of Oracula Leonis in 1577, a collection of cryptic prophecies attributed to the Byzantine Emperor Leo VI the Wise and dedicated to the Cretan governor, Giacomo Foscarini.

Around 1583, Barozzi was tried by the Inquisition on an unknown charge and found guilty. In 1587, he was charged with apostasy, heresy, and for engaging in the occult. He was accused of causing a torrential rain storm in Crete. Found guilty, he was forced to donate silver crosses at the cost of 100 ducats and received a suspended prison sentence. Barozzi as a student in college also was accused of cutting off someones hair for uses unknown, perhaps his sorcery habits.

== Death and legacy ==
He died in Venice. The lunar crater Barocius is named after him.
