= Alexis Clairaut =

French mathematician, astronomer, and geophysicist (1713–1765)

Alexis Claude Clairaut
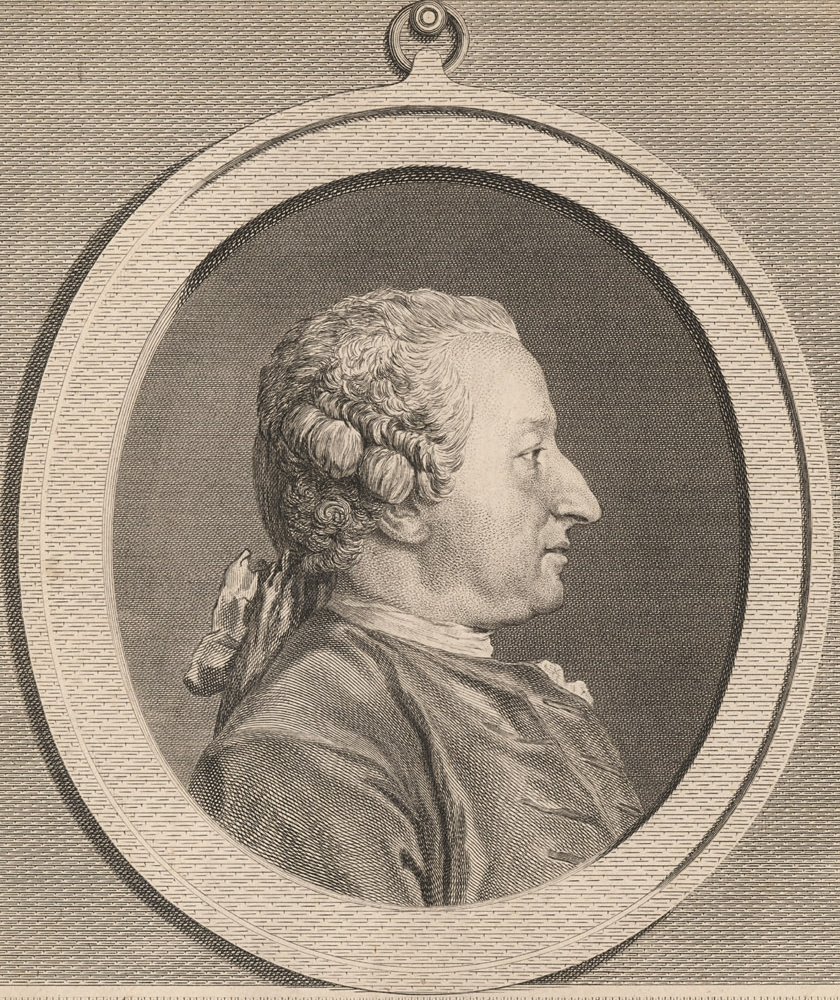
- Alexis Claude Clairaut
- Born: 13 May 1713; Paris, France
- Died: 17 May 1765 (aged 52); Paris, France
- Known for: Clairaut's theorem (gravity); Clairaut's theorem on mixed partial derivatives; Clairaut's equation; Clairaut's relation; Apsidal precession
- Scientific career
- Fields: Mathematics; Physics

Alexis Claude Clairaut (/klɛərˈroʊ/; French: [alɛksi klod klɛʁo]; 13 May 1713 – 17 May 1765) was a French mathematician, astronomer, and physicist. He was a prominent Newtonian whose work helped to establish the validity of the principles and results that Sir Isaac Newton had outlined in the Principia of 1687. Clairaut was one of the key figures in the expedition to the Lapland that helped to confirm Newton's deduction of the figure of the Earth. In that context, Clairaut deduced what is now known as Clairaut's theorem. He also tackled the gravitational three-body problem, being the first to obtain a satisfactory result for the apsidal precession of the Moon's orbit. In mathematics he is also credited with Clairaut's theorem on mixed partial derivatives, Clairaut's equation, and Clairaut's relation in differential geometry.

== Biography ==
=== Childhood and early life ===
Clairaut was born in Paris, France, to Jean-Baptiste and Catherine Petit Clairaut. The couple had 20 children, however only a few of them survived childbirth. His father taught mathematics. Alexis was a child prodigy. He mastered Euclidean geometry and algebra by nine. At ten he studied conic sections and the calculus using Analyse des Infiniment Petits (1696) by Guillaume de l'Hôpital. At the age of twelve he wrote a memoir on four geometrical curves and under his father's tutelage he made such rapid progress in the subject that in his thirteenth year he read before the Académie française an account of the properties of four curves which he had discovered. When only sixteen he finished a treatise on Tortuous Curves, Recherches sur les courbes a double courbure, which, on its publication in 1731, procured his admission into the Royal Academy of Sciences, although he was below the legal age as he was only eighteen. He gave a path-breaking formulae called the distance formulae which helps to find out the distance between any 2 points on the cartesian or XY plane.

=== Personal life and death ===
Clairaut never married and was known for leading an active social life. His growing popularity in society hindered his scientific work: "He was focused," says Bossut, "with dining and with evenings, coupled with a lively taste for women, and seeking to make his pleasures into his day to day work, he lost rest, health, and finally life at the age of fifty-two." Though he led a fulfilling social life, he was very prominent in the advancement of learning in young mathematicians.

He was elected a Fellow of the Royal Society of London on 27 October 1737.

Clairaut died in Paris in 1765. The Clairaut crater on the Moon was named after him in 1935.

== Contributions ==
=== Mathematics ===
In his research on the calculus, Clairaut discovered the equality of mixed partial derivatives (Clairaut's theorem). He gave a condition under which the differential equation $M (x, y) \, dx + N (x, y) \,dy = 0$ was exact, namely, $M_y = N_x$.

He showed that a differential equation of the form $y = xy' + f(y')$, now known as Clairaut's equation, could by solved by substituting $p = y'$ and differentiating both sides. He also established the existence of the integrating factor for first-order linear differential equations. However, he had been anticipated by Nicolas Fatio de Dullier in 1687, and by Johann Bernoulli in a lesson given to L’Hôpital.

In 1741, Clairaut published Éléments de Géométrie, aimed at beginners. For Clairaut, it was imperative for students to make discoveries themselves in a form of active, experiential learning. He began by comparing geometric shapes to measurements of land, a familiar topic, and covered lines, shapes, and even some three dimensional objects. Throughout the book, he copiously related geometry to other branches of mathematics as well as physics and astronomy. Some of the theories and learning methods outlined in the book are still used by teachers today, in geometry and other topics. This textbook was so popular that it went through six editions. In the eighteenth century, Carl Friedrich Gauss extended the contributions of Clairaut and Christiaan Huygens in the geometry introducing the notion of Gaussian curvature.

Clairaut's Éléments de Algèbre (1740) was also well-received in Continental Europe. Its sixth edition was published in 1801.

=== Figure of the Earth ===
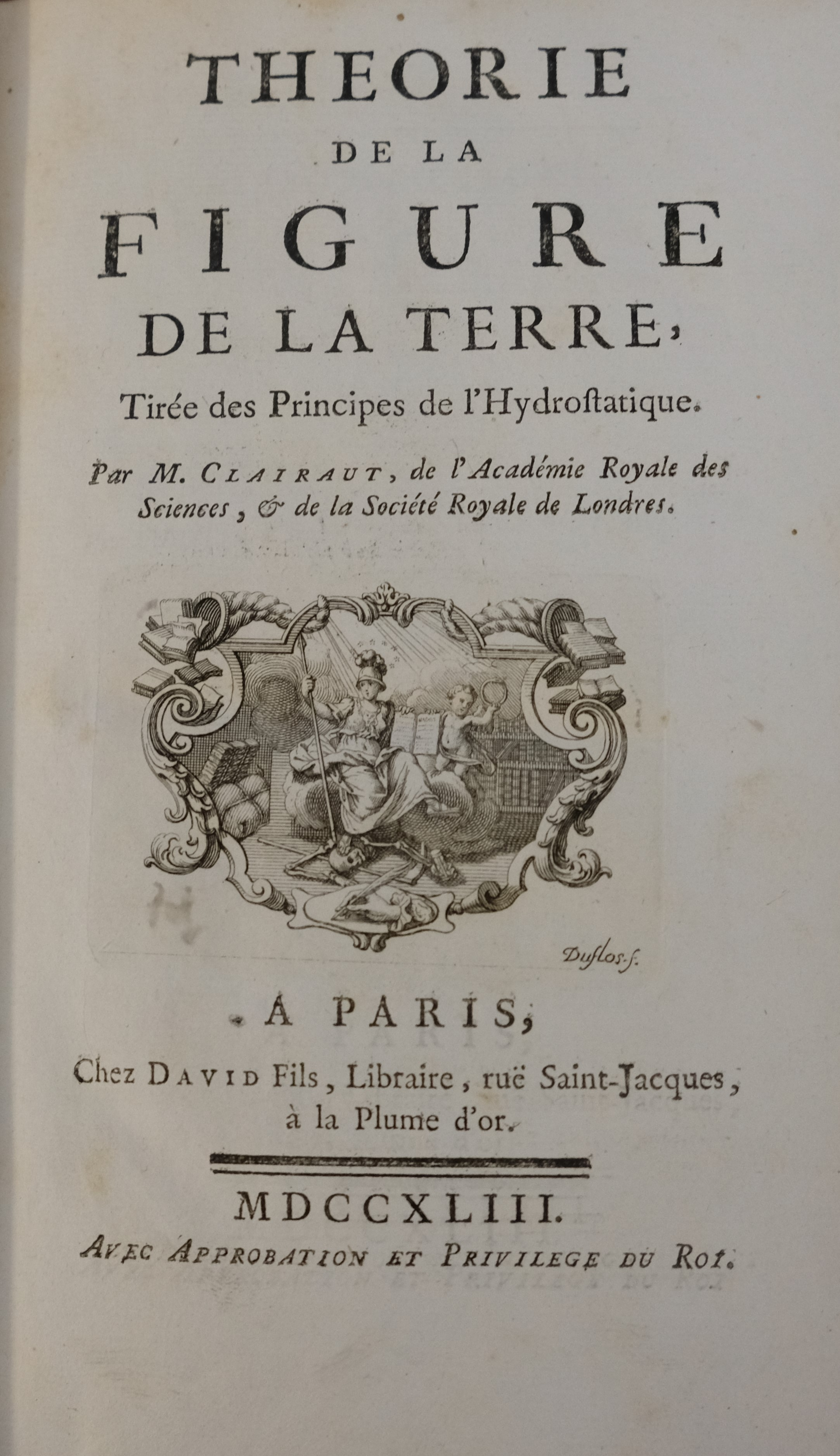
Théorie de la Figure de la Terre, tirée des Principes de l’Hydrostatique, 1743

In 1736, together with Pierre Louis Maupertuis, he took part in the expedition to Lapland, which was undertaken for the purpose of estimating a degree of the meridian arc. The goal of the excursion was to determine the figure of the Earth and to test whether the Earth was an oblate spheroid, as Sir Isaac Newton had claimed in his book Principia, or that it was an oblong, as Giovanni Cassini had thought. Before the expedition team returned to Paris, Clairaut sent his calculations to the Royal Society of London. The writing was later published by the society in the 1736–37 volume of Philosophical Transactions. Initially, Clairaut disagreed with Newton's conclusion. In the article, he outlines several key problems that effectively disprove Newton's calculations, and provides some solutions to the complications. The issues addressed include calculating gravitational attraction, the rotation of an ellipsoid on its axis, and the difference in density of an ellipsoid on its axes. At the end of his letter, Clairaut wrote:

"It appears even Sir Isaac Newton was of the opinion, that it was necessary the Earth should be more dense toward the center, in order to be so much the flatter at the poles: and that it followed from this greater flatness, that gravity increased so much the more from the equator towards the Pole."

This meant not only that the Earth is an ellipsoid, but it is flattened more at the poles and is wider at the center, that is, an oblate spheroid. His article in Philosophical Transactions created much controversy, as he addressed the problems of Newton's theory, but provided few solutions to how to fix the calculations.

After his return, he published his treatise Théorie de la figure de la terre (1743). In this work he promulgated a result, now known as Clairaut's theorem, which connects the gravity at points on the surface of a rotating ellipsoid with the compression and the centrifugal force at the equator. His formula gave the Earth's gravitational field strength as a function of latitude. This hydrostatic model of the shape of the Earth was founded on a paper by the Scottish mathematician Colin Maclaurin, which had shown that a mass of homogeneous fluid set in rotation about a line through its center of mass would, under the mutual attraction of its particles, take the form of a Maclaurin spheroid. Under the assumption that the Earth was composed of concentric ellipsoidal shells of uniform density, Clairaut's theorem could be applied to it, and allowed the eccentricity (or deviation from being a perfect sphere) of the Earth to be calculated from surface measurements of gravity. This validated Newton's calculation. In 1849 George Stokes showed that Clairaut's result was true whatever the interior constitution or density of the Earth, provided the surface was a spheroid of equilibrium of small eccentricity.

=== Mathematical astronomy ===
One of the most controversial issues of the 18th century was the problem of three bodies, or how the Earth, Moon, and Sun are attracted to one another. With the use of the recently founded Leibnizian calculus, Clairaut was able to solve the problem using four differential equations. He was also able to incorporate Newton's inverse-square law and law of attraction into his solution, with minor edits to it. However, these equations only offered approximate measurement, and no exact calculations. Another issue still remained with the three body problem; how the Moon rotates on its apsides. Even Newton could account for only half of the motion of the apsides. This issue had puzzled astronomers. In fact, Clairaut had at first deemed the dilemma so inexplicable, that he was on the point of publishing a new hypothesis as to the law of attraction.

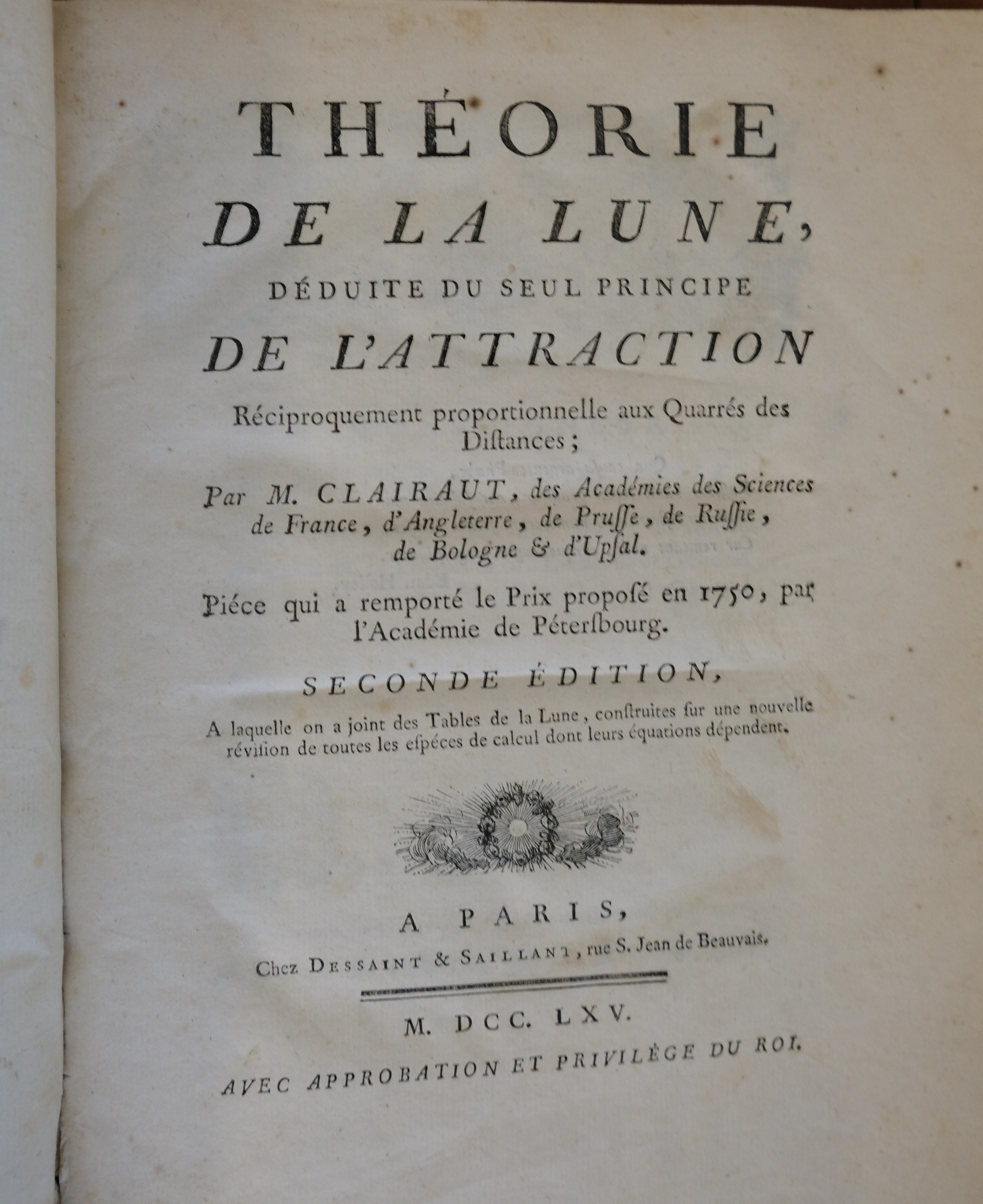
Théorie de la Lune & Tables de la Lune, 1765

The question of the apsides was a heated debate topic in Europe. Along with Clairaut, there were two other mathematicians who were racing to provide the first explanation for the three body problem; Leonhard Euler and Jean le Rond d'Alembert. Euler and d'Alembert were arguing against the use of Newtonian laws to solve the three-body problem. Euler in particular believed that the inverse square law needed revision to accurately calculate the apsides of the Moon.

Despite the hectic competition to come up with the correct solution, Clairaut obtained an ingenious approximate solution of the problem of the three bodies. In 1750 he gained the prize of the St Petersburg Academy for his essay Théorie de la lune; the team made up of Clairaut, Jérome Lalande and Nicole Reine Lepaute successfully computed the date of the 1759 return of Halley's comet. The Théorie de la lune is strictly Newtonian in character. This contains the explanation of the motion of the apsis. It occurred to him to carry the approximation to the third order, and he thereupon found that the result was in accordance with the observations. This was followed in 1754 by some lunar tables, which he computed using a form of the discrete Fourier transform.

The newfound solution to the problem of three bodies ended up meaning more than proving Newton's laws correct. The unravelling of the problem of three bodies also had practical importance. It allowed sailors to determine the longitudinal direction of their ships, which was crucial not only in sailing to a location, but finding their way home as well. This held economic implications as well, because sailors were able to more easily find destinations of trade based on the longitudinal measures.

In the same work, Clairaut introduced for the first time the theory of potentials, known by that name since the 1828 essay of George Green.

Clairaut subsequently wrote various papers on the orbit of the Moon, and on the motion of comets as affected by the perturbation of the planets, particularly on the path of Halley's comet. He also used applied mathematics to study Venus, taking accurate measurements of the planet's size and distance from the Earth. This was the first precise reckoning of the planet's size.

Clairaut used his own contributions to celestial mechanics and astronomy to assist Émilie du Châtelet in her translation and commentary of Newton's Principia.

== Publications ==
- Éléments d'algèbre, (In French), 1741.
- Theorie de la figure de la terre, tirée des principes de l'hydrostatique (in French). Paris: Laurent Durand. 1743.
- Théorie de la figure de la terre, tirée des principes de l'hydrostatique (in French). Paris: Louis Courcier. 1808.
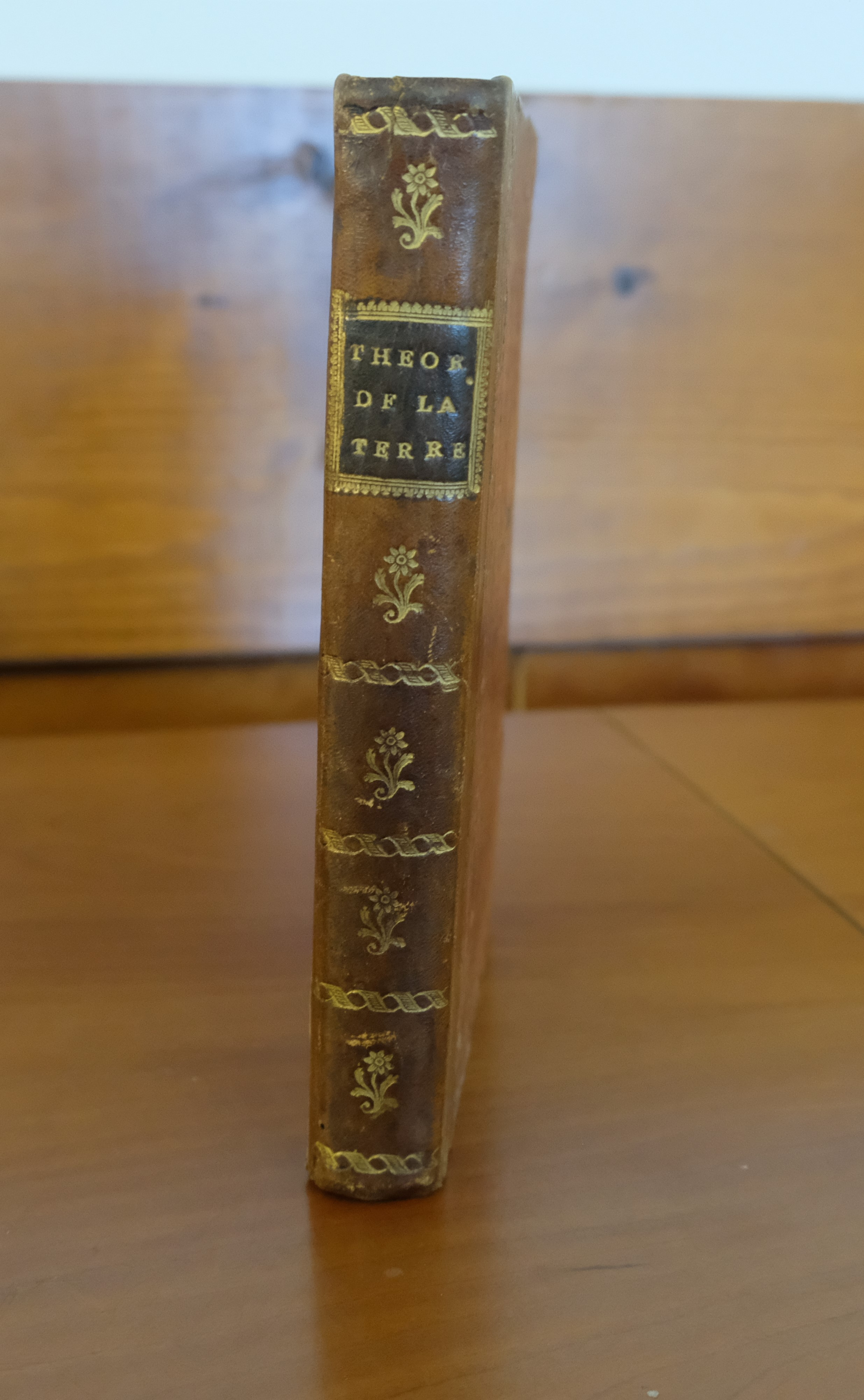
1743 copy of "Théorie de la Figure de la Terre, tirée des Principes de l’Hydrostatique"

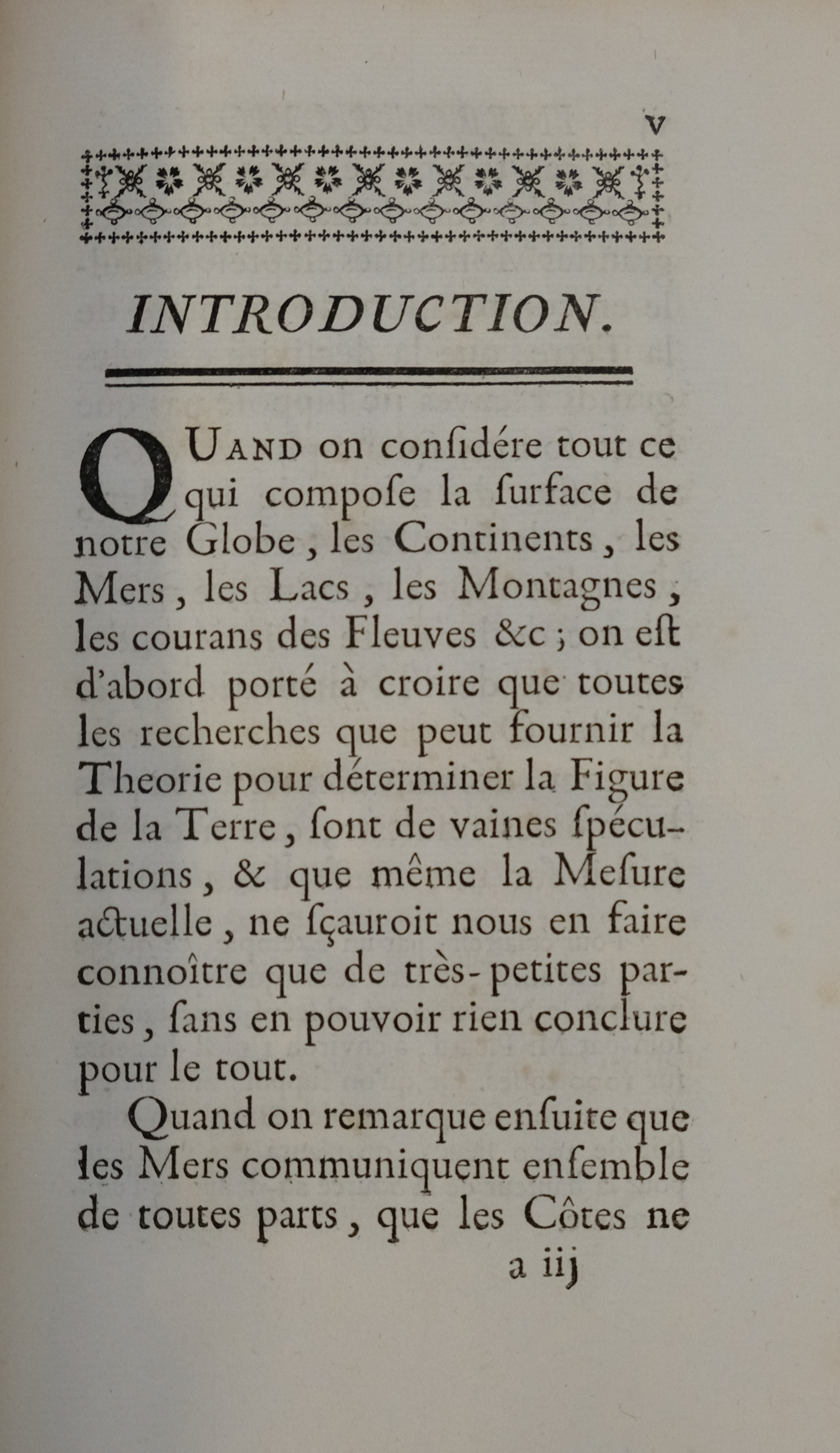
Introduction to "Théorie de la Figure de la Terre, tirée des Principes de l’Hydrostatique"

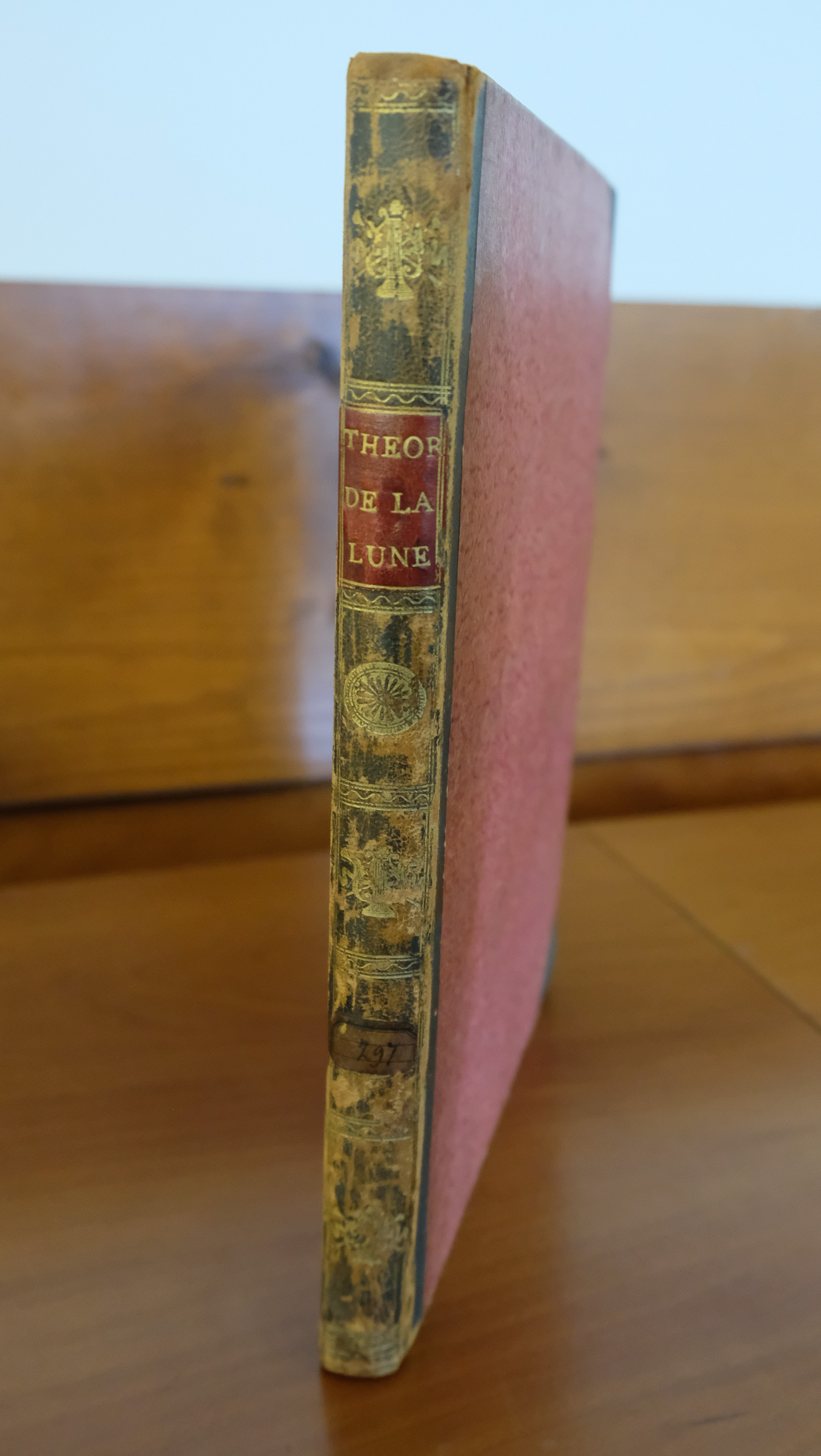
1765 copy of "Théorie de la Lune & Tables de la Lune"

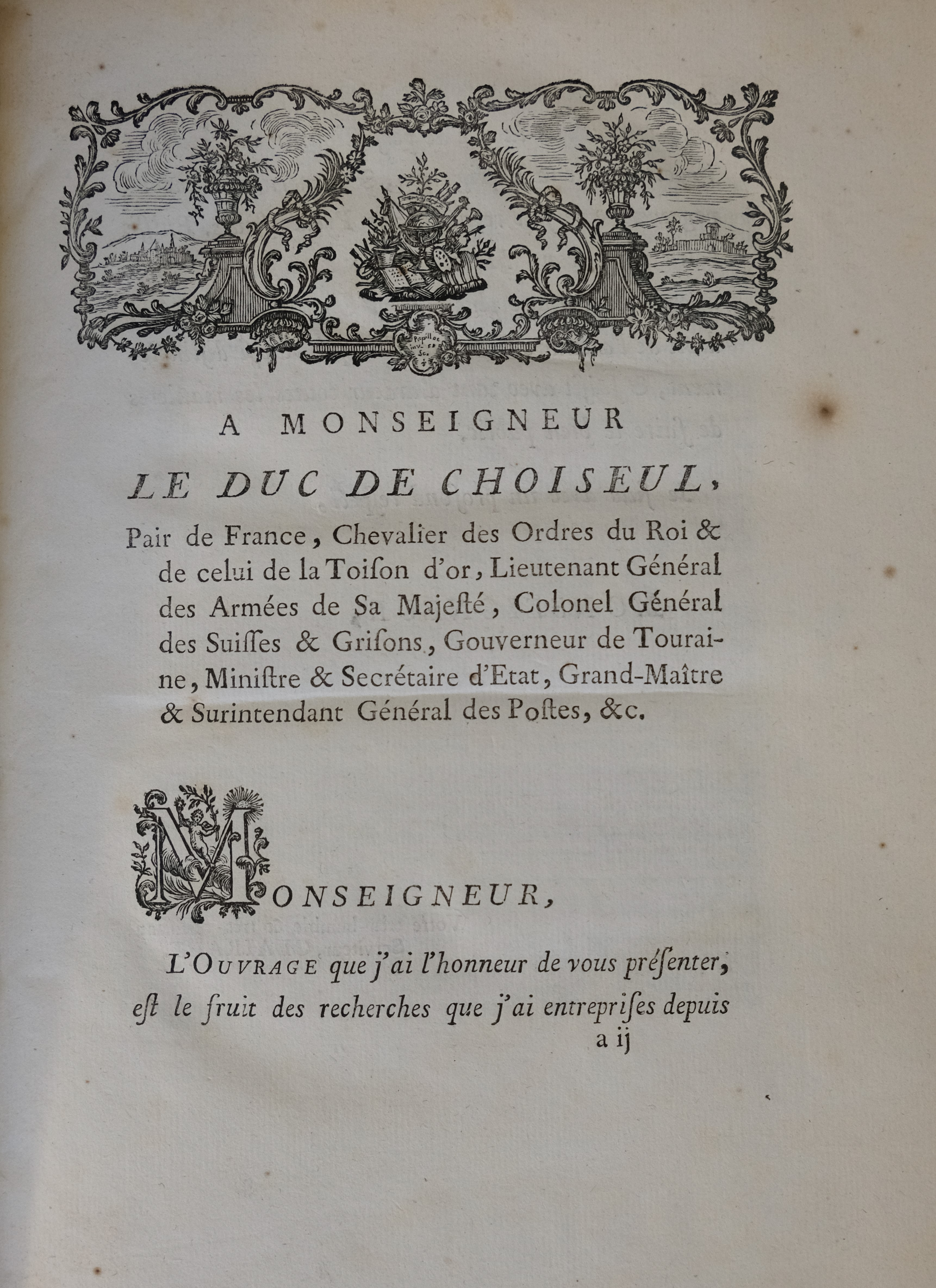
Dedication to "Théorie de la Lune & Tables de la Lune"

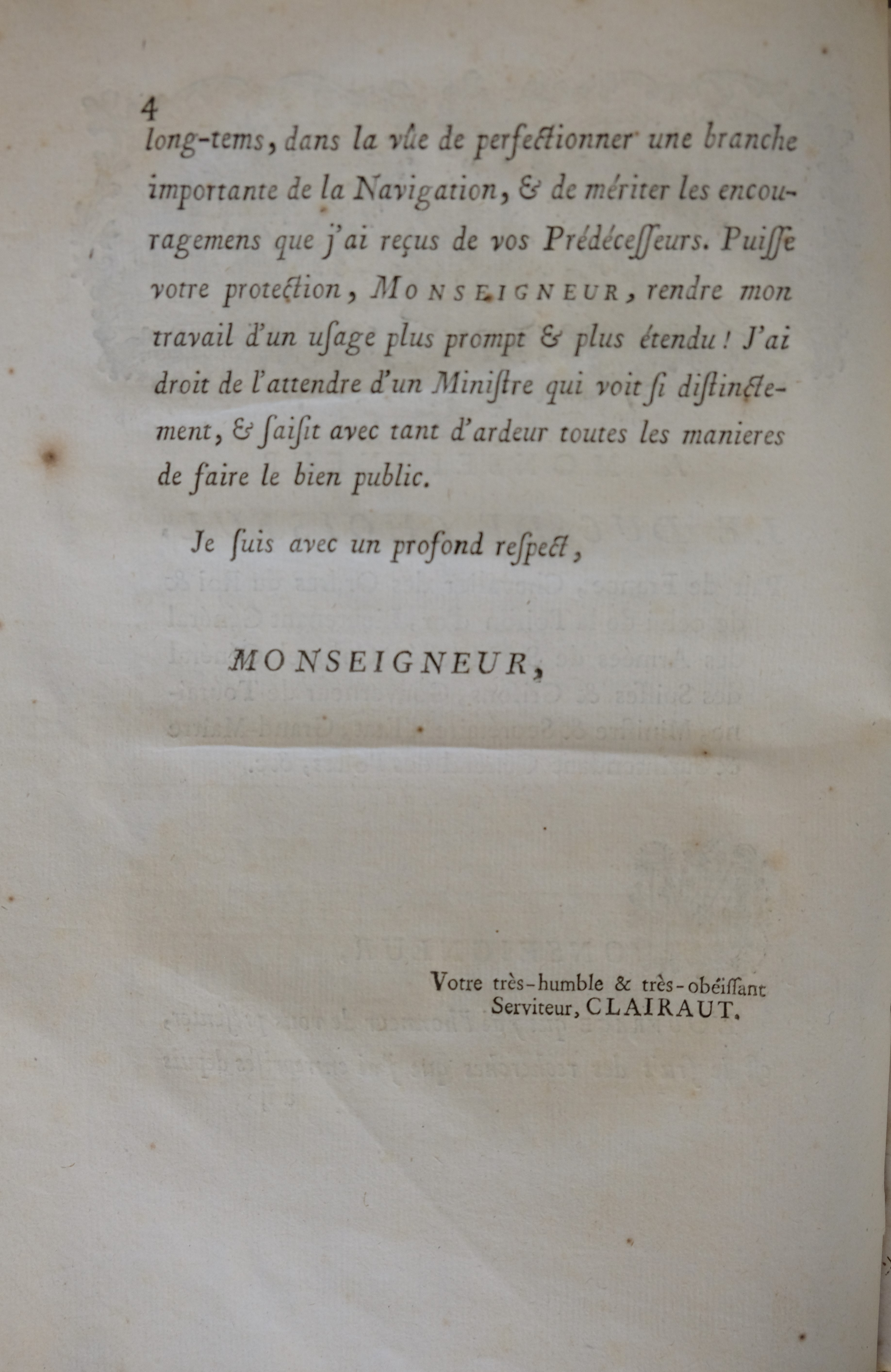
Dedication to "Théorie de la Lune & Tables de la Lune"

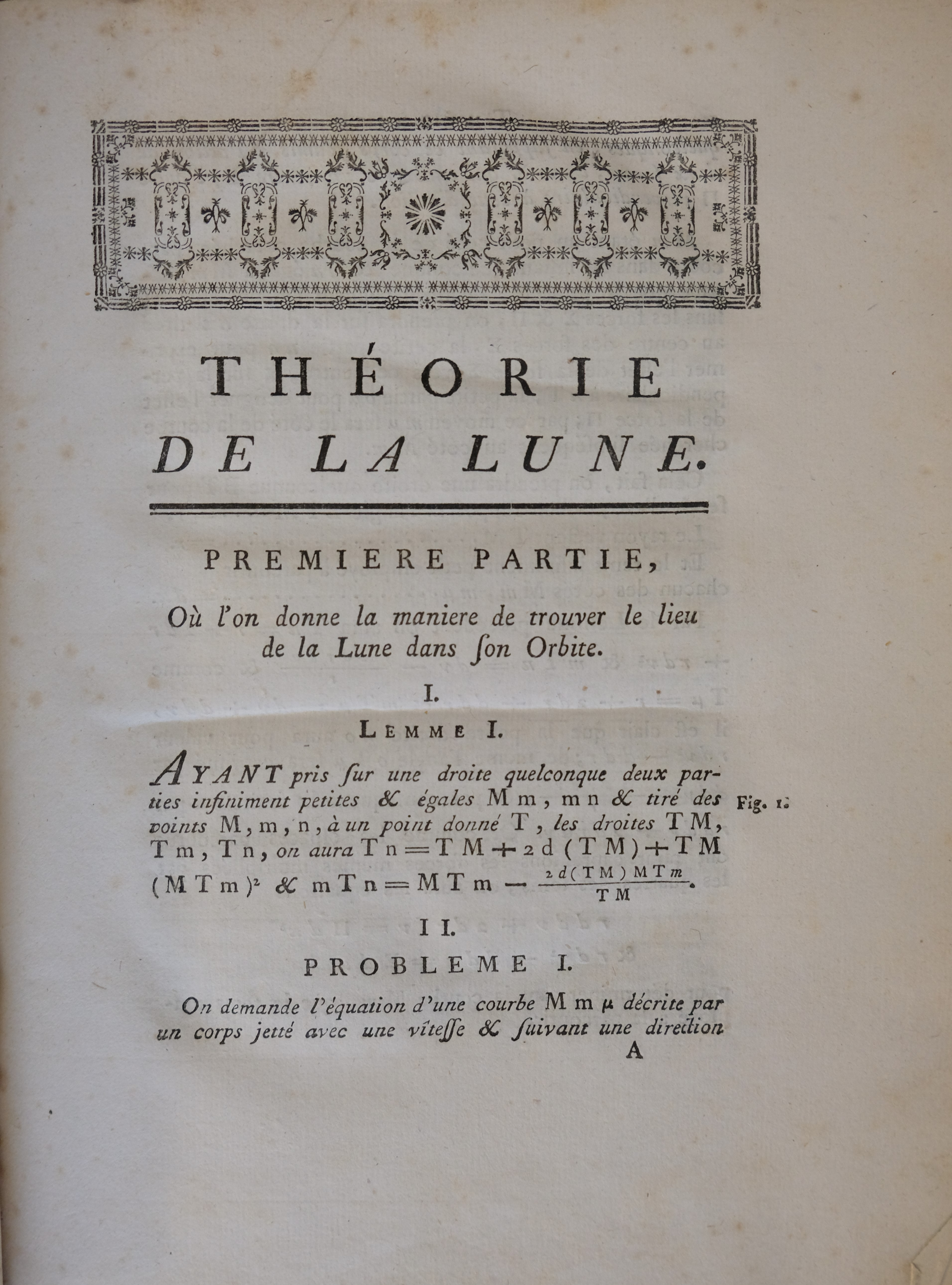
First page of "Théorie de la Lune & Tables de la Lune"

== See also ==
- Differential geometry
- Human computer
- List of child prodigies
