= Clairaut's relation (differential geometry) =

Formula in classical differential geometry

In classical differential geometry, Clairaut's relation, named after Alexis Claude de Clairaut, is a formula that characterizes the great circle paths on the unit sphere. The formula states that if $\gamma$ is a parametrization of a great circle then

$$\rho(\gamma(t)) \sin \psi(\gamma(t)) = \text{constant},\,$$

where $\rho(P)$ is the distance from a point $P$ on the great circle to the $z$-axis, and $\psi(P)$ is the angle between the great circle and the meridian through the point $P$.

The relation remains valid for a geodesic on an arbitrary surface of revolution.

A statement of the general version of Clairaut's relation is:

Let $\gamma$ be a geodesic on a surface of revolution $S$, let $\rho$ be the distance of a point of $S$ from the axis of rotation, and let $\psi$ be the angle between $\gamma$ and the meridian of $S$. Then $\rho \sin \psi$ is constant along $\gamma$. Conversely, if $\rho \sin \psi$ is constant along some curve $\gamma$ in the surface, and if no part of $\gamma$ is part of some parallel of $S$, then $\gamma$ is a geodesic.

— Andrew Pressley: Elementary Differential Geometry, p. 183

Pressley (p. 185) explains this theorem as an expression of conservation of angular momentum about the axis of revolution when a particle moves along a geodesic under no forces other than those that keep it on the surface.

Now imagine a particle constrained to move on a surface of revolution, without external torque around the axis. By conservation of angular momentum:

$$r \, v_\theta = L,$$

where

- $r$ = distance to the axis,
- $v_\theta$ = component of velocity orthogonal to the meridian,
- $L$ = conserved angular momentum around the axis.

But geometrically,

$$v_\theta = |v| \sin \psi,$$

If we normalize so the speed $|v|=1$ (unit speed geodesics), we get:

$$r \sin \psi = \frac{L}{|v|} = \text{constant}.$$
