= Sant'Agostino, Padua =

Former church in Padua, Italy

Coordinates: 45°24′13.2″N 11°51′52.7″E

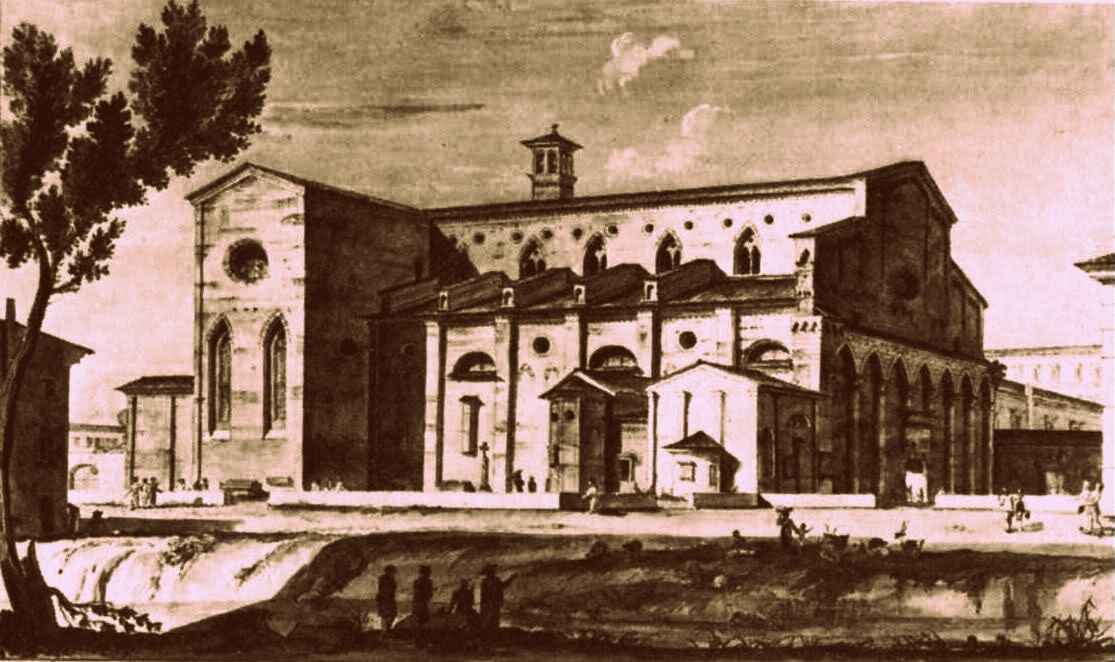
Church of Sant'Agostino in Padova in the eighteenth century. Print by Marino Urbani.

Sant'Agostino is a former Gothic-style church in Padua, region of Veneto, Italy. It was razed to the ground in 1819 by the Austrian authorities to construct a military hospital.

== History ==
This large church, and its adjacent Dominican order convent, was located next to the Ponte di Sant'Agostino. It was described by the historian Pietro Selvatico as "without doubt the most beautiful medieval building in Padua after the Basilica di Sant'Antonio". In structure, it resembled San Nicolo in Treviso.

The architect was Leonardo Murario, called il Rocalica, and was built between 1226 and 1275 under the patronage of Nicolò di Boccassio, Bishop of Padua and future pope Benedict XI. Many members of the Carrara family, lords of Padua during 1318 to 1405, were buried here. Their tombs were moved to the church of the Eremitani prior to demolition. Some of the columns were reused by the architect Giuseppe Jappelli, in the building now used by the Liceo Artistico Pietro Selvatico. The building is now the caserma Piave, where a fragment of a fresco by Guariento, originally in the church was discovered.
