= Cuvier (crater) =

Lunar impact crater

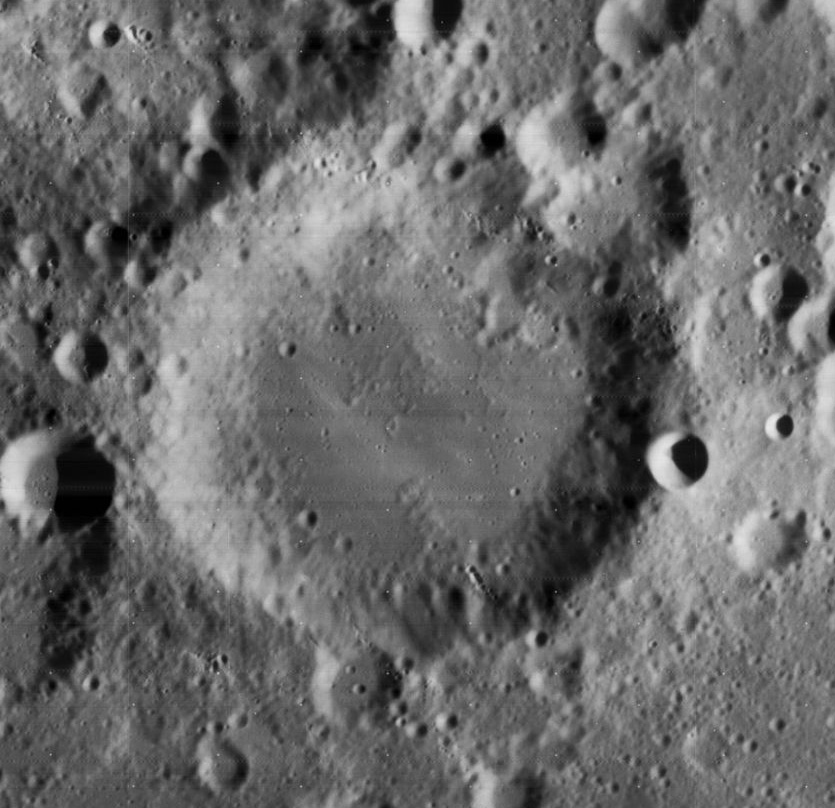
- Lunar Orbiter 4 image
- Coordinates: 50.3°S 9.9°E
- Diameter: 77.30 km (48.03 mi)
- Depth: 3.8 km (2.4 mi)
- Colongitude: 351° at sunrise
- Eponym: Georges Cuvier

Cuvier is a lunar impact crater on the southern part of the Moon's near side. It is attached to the east-southeast rim of the unusually shaped formation Heraclitus. To the northeast is the crater Clairaut.

The rim of this crater has been worn and eroded by subsequent impacts, leaving an outer wall that has been rounded and diminished in prominence. There is a small but notable crater pair lying across the northern rim, and two other smaller craters lie along the east (Cuvier C) and south rims. There are also several small craterlets lying across the rim to the north-northwest. Where the rim is shared with Heraclitus, there is a slight inward bulge to the wall, producing a short section where the rim appears slightly flatter.

The interior floor is level and nearly featureless, and much of the floor appears to have been resurfaced. This surface does not possess the low albedo characteristic of the lunar mare, and it matches the hue of the surrounding terrain. Instead, the floor is marked by faint traces of ray material from elsewhere.

This crater is named after French natural scientist and paleontologist Georges Cuvier (1769-1832), the creator of comparative anatomy. His name was included in the lunar nomenclature of German astronomer J. H. von Mädler during the 19th century. Its designation was formally adopted by the International Astronomical Union in 1935.

== Satellite craters ==
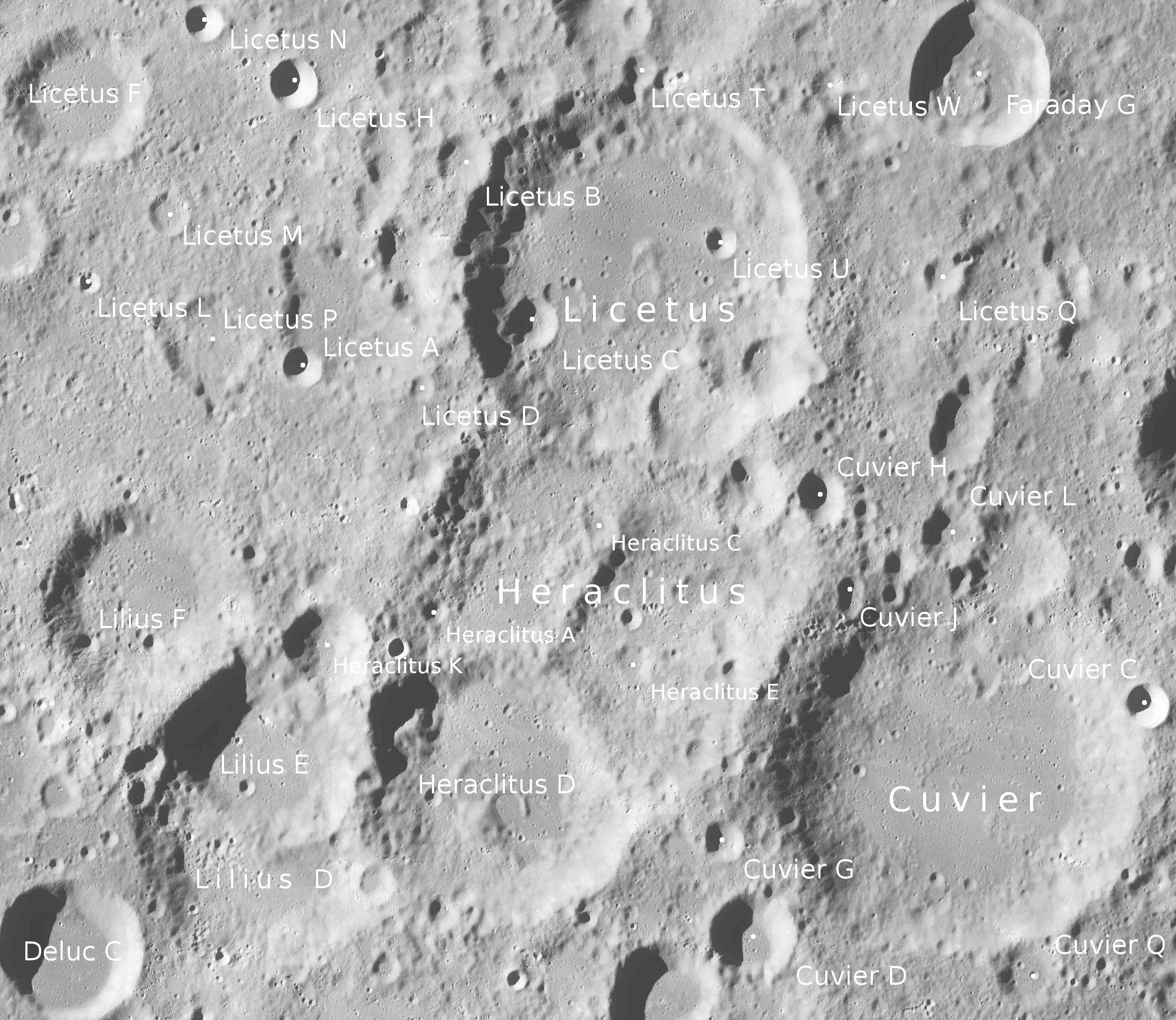
The trio of Heraclitus, Licetus, and Cuvier craters, with associated satellite features

By convention these features are identified on lunar maps by placing the letter on the side of the crater midpoint that is closest to Cuvier.

Cuvier	Latitude	Longitude	Diameter
A	52.4° S	12.0° E	18 km
B	51.7° S	13.8° E	17 km
C	49.9° S	11.7° E	9 km
D	51.3° S	7.8° E	17 km
E	52.3° S	12.9° E	19 km
F	52.2° S	11.2° E	16 km
G	50.8° S	7.5° E	8 km
H	48.6° S	8.5° E	10 km
J	49.3° S	8.8° E	6 km
K	52.2° S	10.0° E	8 km
L	48.9° S	9.8° E	13 km
M	53.3° S	10.9° E	6 km
N	53.4° S	12.1° E	4 km
O	51.6° S	12.1° E	10 km
P	50.0° S	12.7° E	11 km
Q	51.6° S	10.6° E	13 km
R	51.0° S	13.1° E	7 km

Cyrano E dates to the Eratosthenian period and has a meteoritic iron-rich impact melt.
