= Clairaut (crater) =

Lunar impact crater

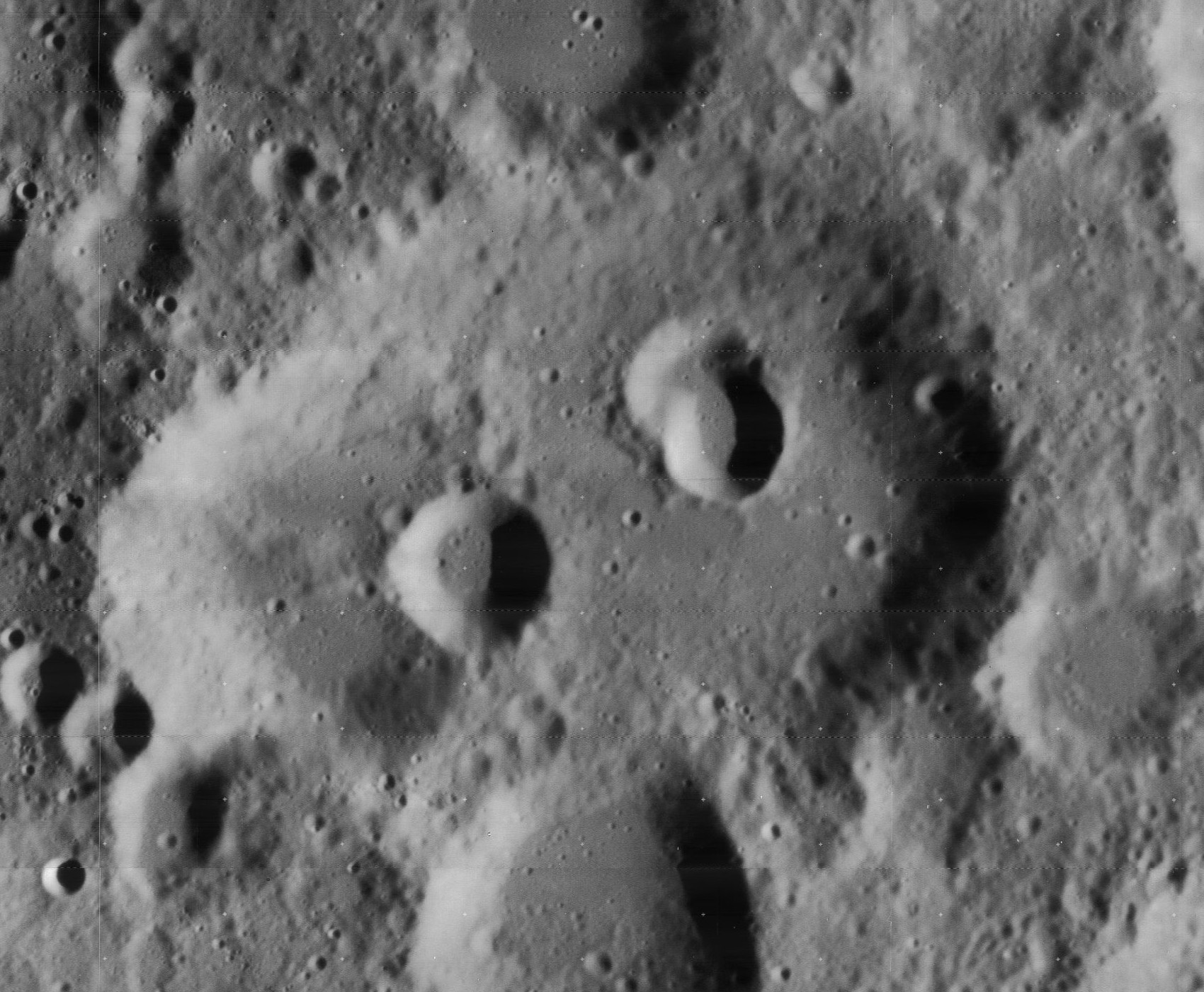
- Lunar Orbiter 4 image
- Coordinates: 47.7°S 13.9°E
- Diameter: 75 km
- Depth: 2.7 km
- Colongitude: 348° at sunrise
- Eponym: Alexis C. Clairaut

Clairaut is a lunar impact crater that is located in the rugged southern highlands of the Moon's near side. It is readily identified by a pair of craters on its interior floor. Clairaut lies directly to the south of the crater Maurolycus and southeast of Barocius. Just to the southwest is Cuvier.

This crater has been eroded and damaged by subsequent impacts, particularly in the southern half of the formation. The satellite crater Clairaut A lies across the southeastern rim. The southern rim has been modified by several small craters, including Clairaut B. On the southeastern interior floor is the small crater Clairaut C. In the northern part of the floor is a merged crater pair Clairaut D. Clairaut E is attached to the exterior of the northwest rim.

The inner wall of Clairaut has been softened by impacts until now it forms a simple slope down to the relatively flat floor, at least where the floor has not been marked by impacts. There is a minor inward bulge along the inner wall to the west-northwest.

Thus formation is named after French mathematician Alexis C. Clairaut (1713-1765). His name was introduced with the lunar nomenclature of German astronomer Johann H. von Mädler in 1837. Its designation was formally adopted by the International Astronomical Union in 1935.

== Satellite craters ==
By convention these features are identified on lunar maps by placing the letter on the side of the crater midpoint that is closest to Clairaut.

Clairaut	Latitude	Longitude	Diameter
A	48.9° S	14.8° E	36 km
B	48.3° S	12.6° E	43 km
C	48.1° S	13.5° E	17 km
D	47.3° S	14.2° E	12 km
E	46.4° S	12.6° E	29 km
F	46.0° S	14.5° E	23 km
G	47.2° S	11.7° E	6 km
H	48.9° S	12.1° E	9 km
J	45.7° S	12.7° E	14 km
K	49.7° S	14.0° E	12 km
M	46.1° S	13.8° E	5 km
P	49.0° S	11.8° E	9 km
R	48.0° S	15.9° E	15 km
S	47.5° S	16.3° E	22 km
