= Giovanni Battista Brocchi =

Italian naturalist, mineralogist and geologist (1772–1826)

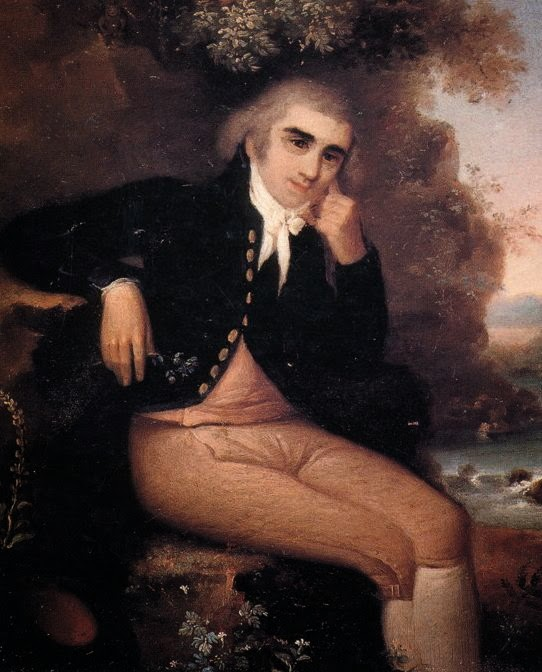
- Born: 18 February 1772; Bassano del Grappa, Republic of Venice
- Died: 25 September 1826 (aged 54); Khartoum, Khedivate of Egypt
- Education: University of Padua
- Scientific career
- Author abbrev. (botany): Brocchi

Giovanni Battista (or Giambattista) Brocchi (18 February 1772 – 25 September 1826) was an Italian naturalist, mineralogist and geologist.

== Biography ==
Giovanni Battista Brocchi was born in Bassano del Grappa and studied jurisprudence at the University of Padua, but his attention was turned to mineralogy and botany. The Bassanese naturalist Antonio Gaidon, guided him towards his first scientific studies and was Brocchi's first master in the geological and mineralogical disciplines. Gaidon introduced Brocchi to the naturalists Giuseppe Olivi and Alberto Fortis, the latter accompanying Brocchi on geological excursions in the Bassano area. In 1802 he was appointed professor of botany in the new lyceum of Brescia; but he more especially devoted himself to geological researches in the adjacent districts. The fruits of these labors appeared in different publications, particularly in his Trattato mineralogico e chimico sulle miniere di ferro del dipartimento del Mella (1808) a treatise on the iron mines of the Mella traditional region. These researches procured him the office of inspector of mines in the recently established Kingdom of Italy, and enabled him to extend his investigations over a great part of the country.

In 1811 Brocchi produced a valuable essay entitled Memoria mineralogica sulla Valle di Fassa in Tirolo; but his most important work is the Conchiologia fossile subapennina con osservazioni geologiche sugli Apennini, e sul suolo adiacente (2 vols., Milan, 1814), containing accurate details of the structure of the Apennine range, and an account of the marine shell fossils of the Italian Tertiary strata compared with existing species. These subjects were further illustrated by his geognostic map, and his Catalogo ragionato di una raccolta di rocce, disposto con ordine geografico, per servire alla geognosia dell' Italia (Milan, 1817). His work Dello stato fisico del suolo di Roma (1820), with its accompanying map, is likewise noteworthy. In it he corrected the erroneous views of Scipione Breislak, who conceived that Rome occupies the site of a volcano, to which he ascribed the volcanic materials that cover the seven hills. Brocchi pointed out that these materials were derived either from Monte Albano, an extinct volcano, twelve miles from the city, or from the Monti Cimini, still farther to the north.

In 1814 Brocchi presented the thesis that species, like individuals, age and eventually die out — an idea that later influenced Charles Darwin.

Several papers by him, on mineralogical subjects, appeared in the Biblioteca Italiana from 1816 to 1823. In the latter year, Brocchi sailed for Egypt, in order to explore the geology of that country and report on its mineral resources. Every facility was granted by Mehemet Ali, who in 1825 appointed him one of a commission to examine the territory of the recently conquered Kingdom of Sennar; but Brocchi fell a victim to the climate, and died at Khartoum on the 25th of September 1826, possibly of dysentery. Much of his writings and collections are now housed in the Museo Civico di Bassano.
