= Pernette (disambiguation) =

A pernette is a prop to support pottery in a kiln so that pottery does not touch each other or kiln's floor.

Pernette may also refer to:

- Pernette (given name)
- Pernette (surname)
- "La Pernette" a track from Malicorne's album Malicorne 1
- Pernette, a 1868 poetic work of French poet Victor de Laprade
