= Huberia =

Huberia is the scientific name of two genera of organisms and may refer to:

- Huberia (ant), a genus of insects in the family Formicidae
- Huberia (plant), a genus of plants in the family Melastomataceae
