= Saussure (crater) =

Lunar surface depression

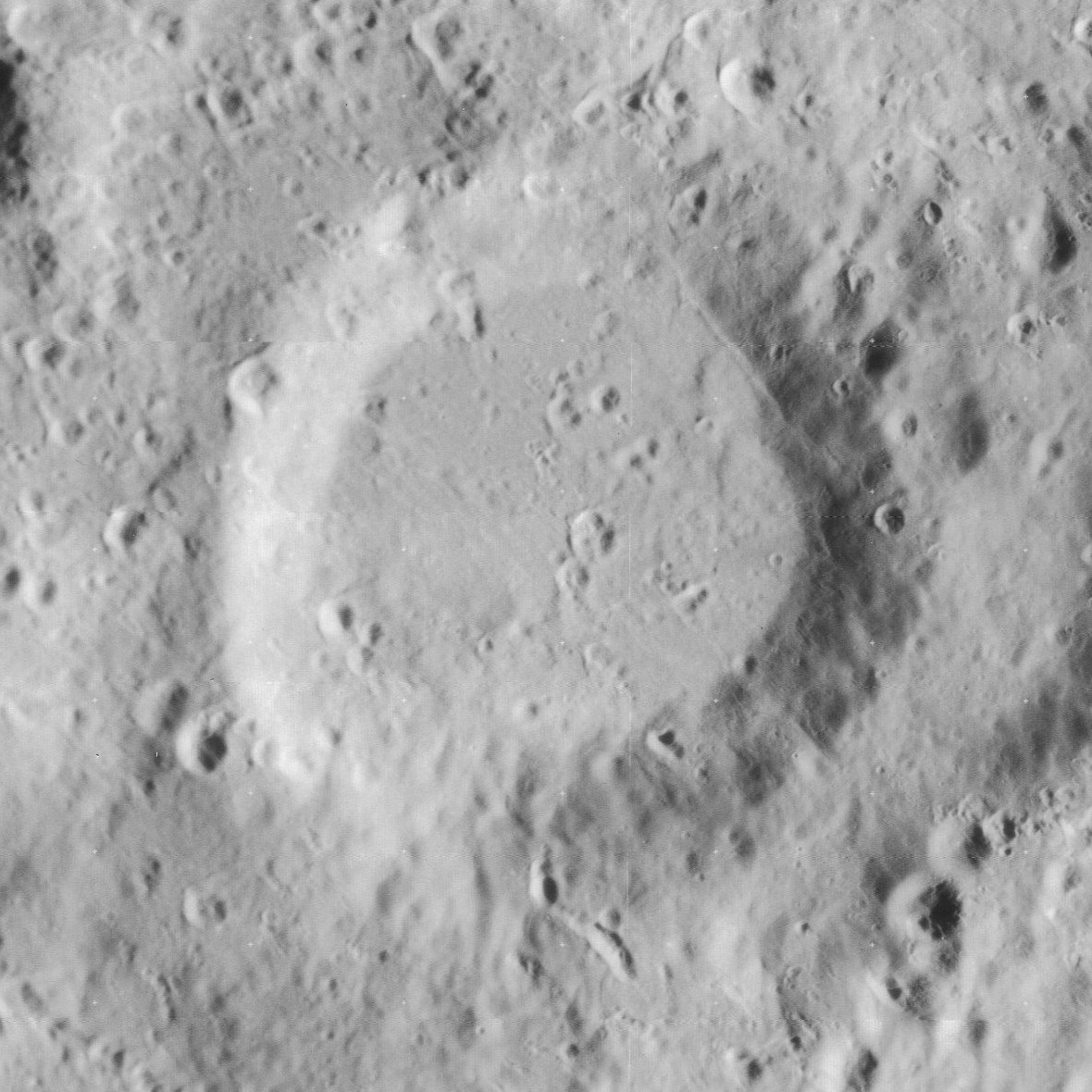
- Lunar Orbiter 4 image
- Coordinates: 43.3°S 3.8°W
- Diameter: 54 km
- Depth: 1.8 km
- Colongitude: 187° at sunrise
- Eponym: H-B de Saussure

Saussure is a lunar impact crater. It is located in the crater-riddled terrain in the southern hemisphere of the Moon's near side. Just to the north and nearly attached to the rim is the larger crater Orontius. About a half crater diameter due west is the slightly larger crater Pictet. Just to the east is a curving ridge in the surface, possibly the remains of a crater that has been almost completely overlaid by Saussure.

The outer rim of Saussure is worn but relatively intact, with only the southern edge being somewhat disrupted. A small impact lies across the northeastern rim and a pair of craterlets along the western edge. The inner walls are relatively featureless, and slope down to the generally level interior floor. This bottom surface is marked only by a few tiny craters.

It was named after 18th century Genevan geologist Horace Bénédict de Saussure. He was the professor, and later colleague and friend of Marc-Auguste Pictet (eponym of nearby Pictet crater).

== Satellite craters ==
By convention these features are identified on lunar maps by placing the letter on the side of the crater midpoint that is closest to Saussure.

| Saussure | Latitude | Longitude | Diameter |
|---|---|---|---|
| A | 43.8° S | 0.5° W | 19 km |
| B | 42.2° S | 3.9° W | 5 km |
| C | 44.8° S | 0.6° W | 16 km |
| Ca | 45.2° S | 0.5° W | 16 km |
| D | 46.9° S | 0.2° E | 20 km |
| E | 44.7° S | 2.1° W | 12 km |
| F | 44.3° S | 4.6° W | 4 km |
