= Büsching (crater) =

Lunar impact crater

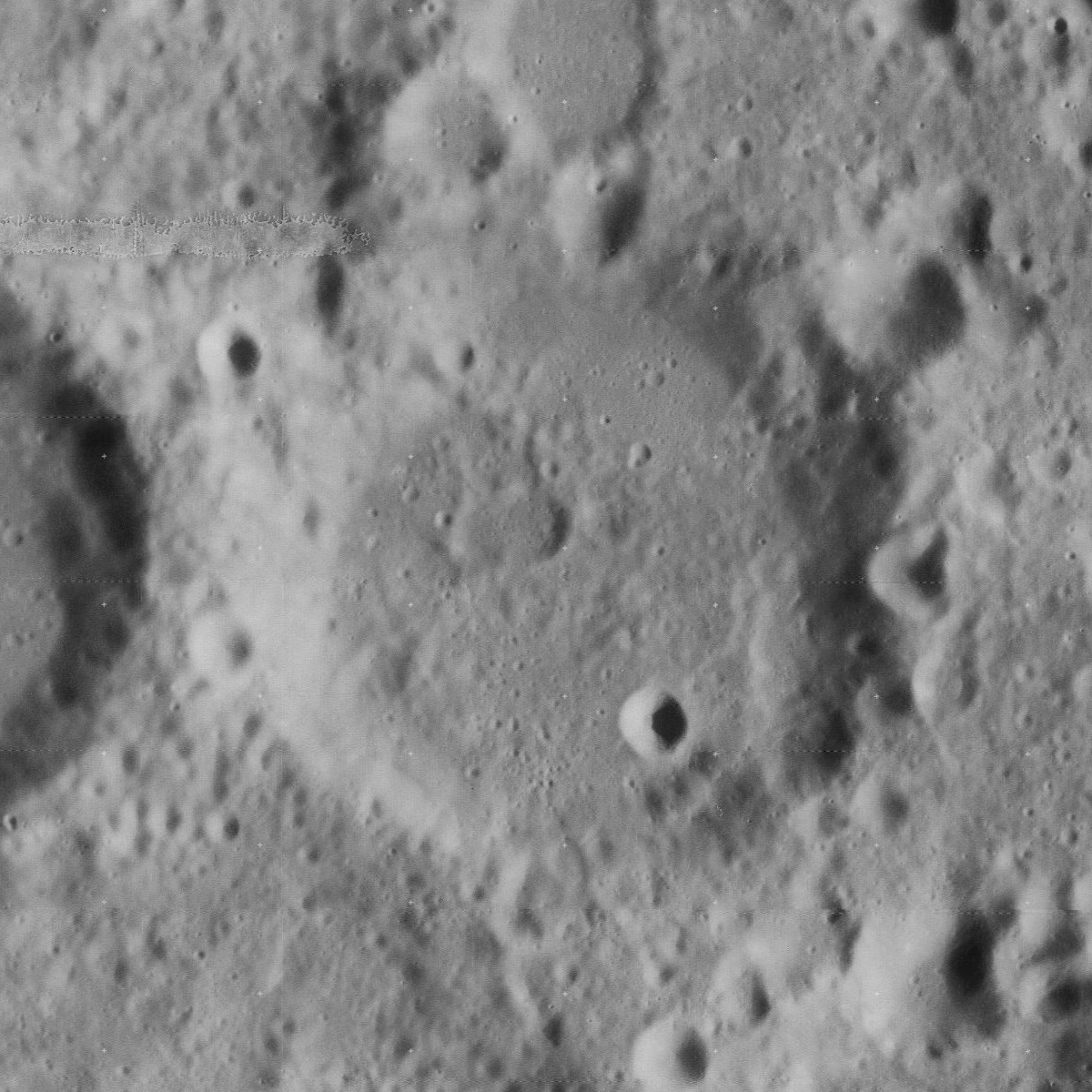
- Lunar Orbiter 4 image
- Coordinates: 38.0°S 20.0°E
- Diameter: 53.49 km (33.24 mi)
- Depth: 1.7 km (1.1 mi)
- Colongitude: 343° at sunrise
- Eponym: Anton F. Büsching

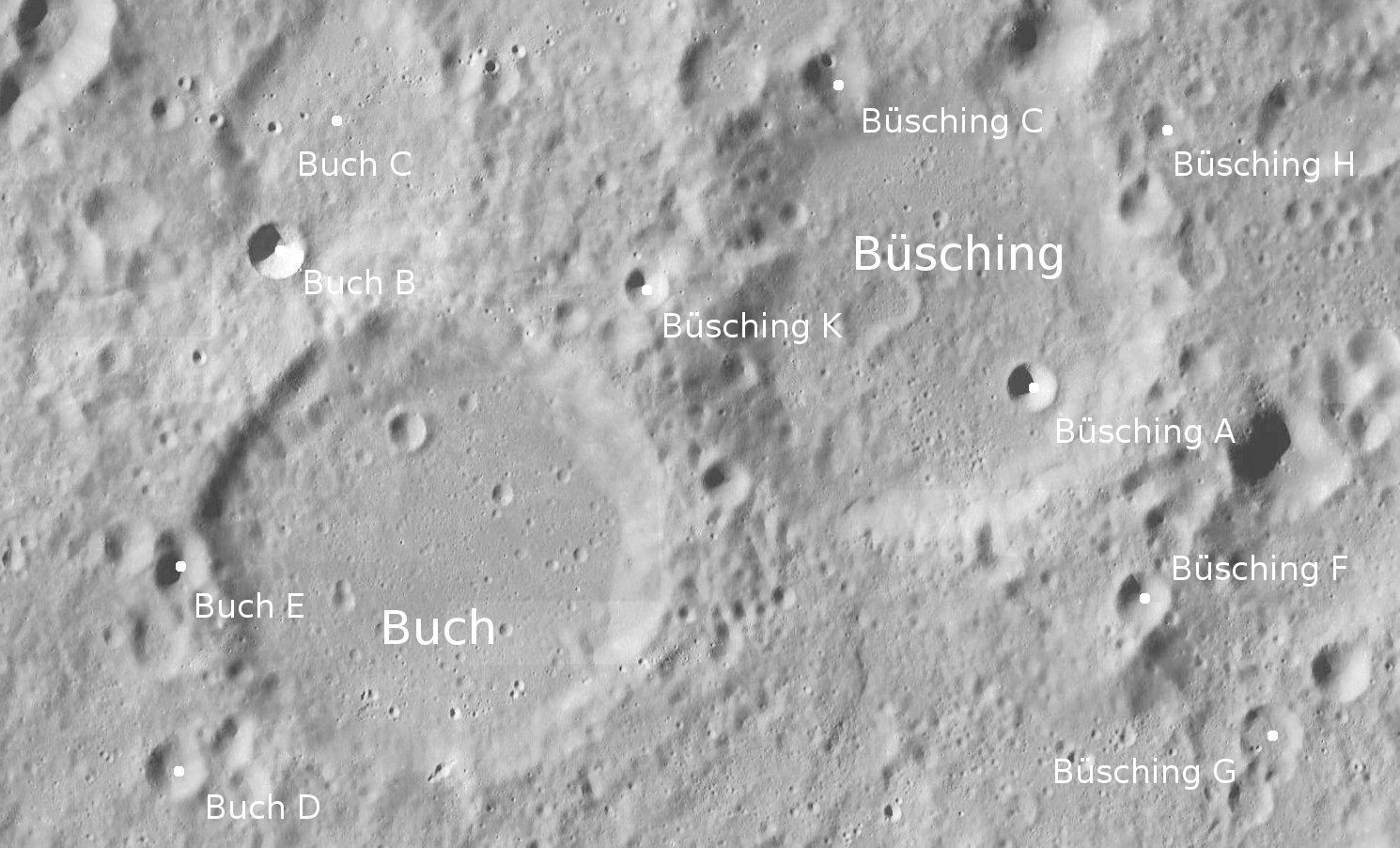
Map showing Buch and Büsching

Büsching is a lunar impact crater that is located in the crater-covered southern highlands of the Moon. The similar-sized crater Buch is located adjacent to its southwestern rim, and further to the southwest lies Maurolycus.

This crater has been eroded by a long history of subsequent impacts, so that the rim has been worn down and the edge rounded. Several small craterlets lie along the edge of the rim, and there is a tiny crater on the interior floor near the east-southeastern rim. The interior floor is somewhat irregular and lacks a central peak at the midpoint.

This crater named after German geographer Anton F. Büsching (1724-1793). His name was introduced into lunar nomenclature by German astronomer J. H. von Mädler during the 19th century. This designation was formally adopted by the International Astronomical Union in 1935.

== Satellite craters ==
By convention these features are identified on lunar maps by placing the letter on the side of the crater midpoint that is closest to Büsching.

Büsching	Latitude	Longitude	Diameter
A	38.3° S	20.4° E	6 km
B	39.0° S	22.8° E	17 km
C	37.2° S	19.6° E	7 km
D	38.6° S	22.0° E	33 km
E	36.6° S	18.4° E	15 km
F	39.0° S	21.0° E	6 km
G	39.5° S	21.6° E	8 km
H	37.4° S	21.1° E	5 km
J	39.5° S	22.2° E	7 km
K	37.9° S	18.7° E	5 km
