= Miller (crater) =

Crater on the Moon

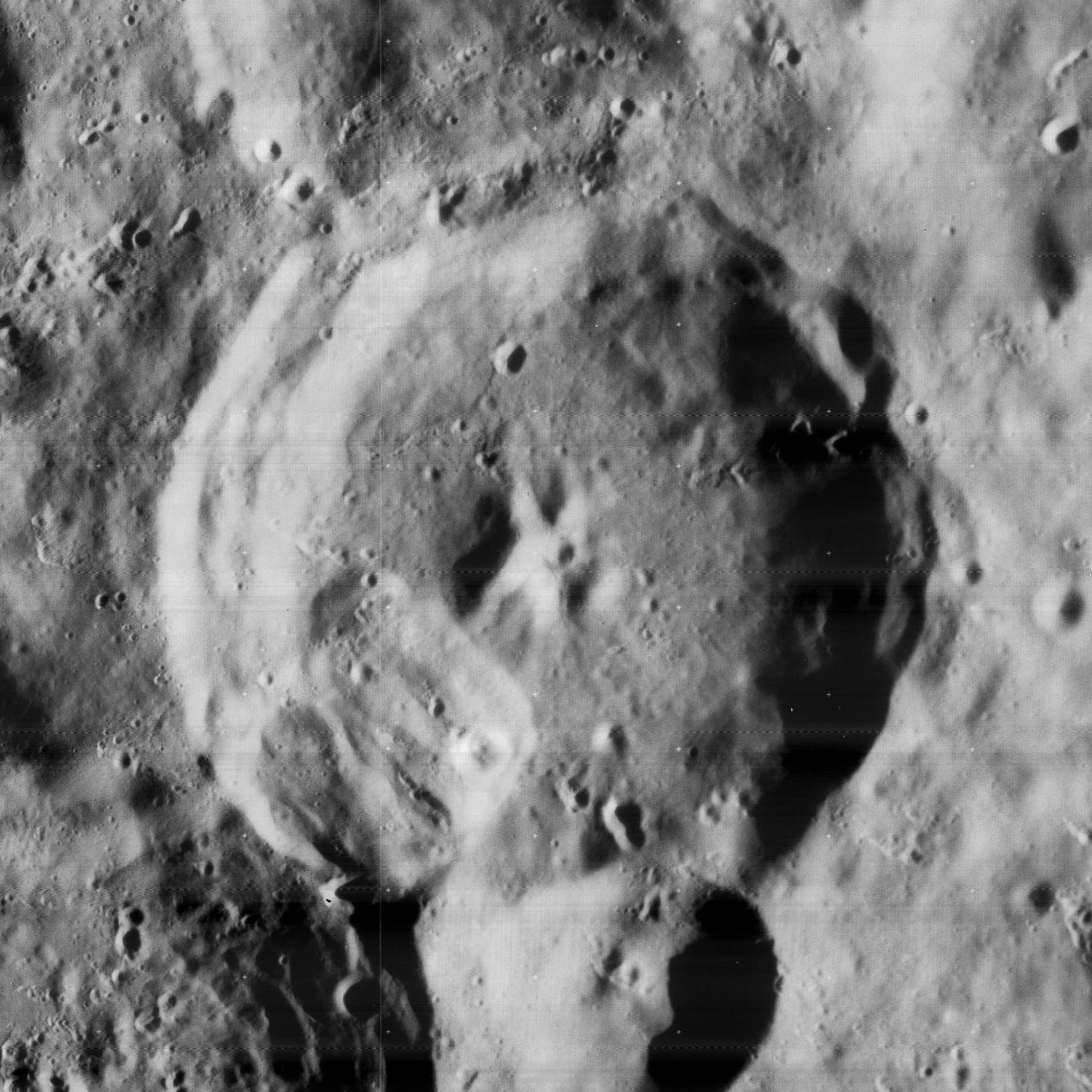
- Lunar Orbiter 4 image
- Coordinates: 39.3°S 0.8°E
- Diameter: 75 km
- Depth: 3.5 km
- Colongitude: 0° at sunrise
- Eponym: William A. Miller

Miller is a lunar impact crater that lies amidst the rugged terrain in the southern part of the Moon. It is attached to the northern rim of the smaller crater Nasireddin, and the outer rampart of the latter reaches almost to the central peak formation at the midpoint of Miller's interior floor. Together with Huggins to the southwest and Orontius to the south-southwest, this foursome forms a chain of craters forming an arc that curves towards the north. The northwest rim of Miller in turn is attached to the satellite crater Miller C, forming the end of the arc. To the southeast lies Stöfler. The crater is named after British chemist William Allen Miller.

The rim of Miller is nearly circular with a system of terraces along the inner wall. The interior floor is nearly level with the aforementioned central peak formation located at the midpoint. The crater Stöfler H is attached to the exterior southeast rim and intrudes slightly into the interior. There are a few tiny craterlets lying within the crater, including one along the rampart of Nasiredden.

== Satellite craters ==
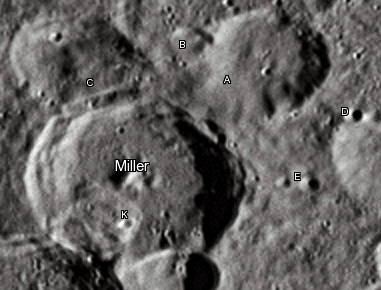
Miller crater and its satellite craters taken from Earth in 2012 at the University of Hertfordshire's Bayfordbury Observatory with the telescopes Meade LX200 14" and Lumenera Skynyx 2-1

By convention these features are identified on lunar maps by placing the letter on the side of the crater midpoint that is closest to Miller.

Miller	Latitude	Longitude	Diameter
A	37.7° S	1.8° E	39 km
B	37.6° S	1.0° E	12 km
C	38.2° S	0.3° W	36 km
D	38.0° S	3.1° E	5 km
E	38.8° S	2.8° E	6 km
K	39.8° S	0.9° E	4 km
