= Pictet (crater) =

Lunar crater

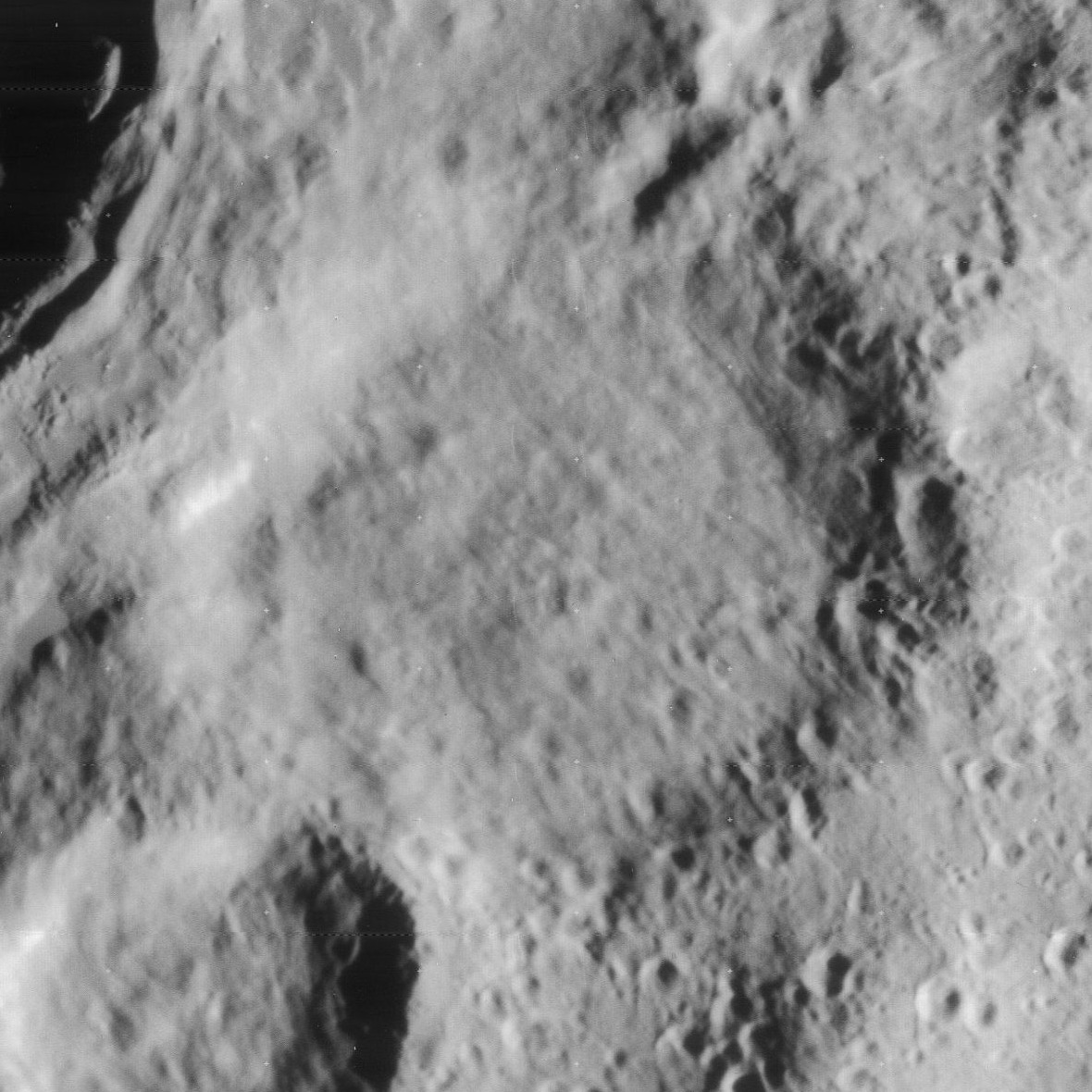
- Lunar Orbiter 4 image
- Coordinates: 43.6°S 7.4°W
- Diameter: 62 km
- Depth: 2.7 km
- Colongitude: 8° at sunrise
- Eponym: Marc-Auguste Pictet

Pictet is a lunar impact crater located just to the east of the larger and more prominent impact crater Tycho. The high-albedo rays and ejecta from Tycho lie across Pictet and spread far to the east and in other directions. Pictet is older than Tycho and is somewhat worn by past impacts. The slightly smaller crater Pictet A intrudes slightly into the southwest rim. The larger crater Pictet E is nearly joined to the north rim. To the east is Saussure, and to the northeast is the larger, worn formation Orontius.

Swiss physicist Marc-Auguste Pictet (eponym of Pictet crater) was the student and later colleague and friend of Horace-Bénédict de Saussure (eponym of nearby Saussure crater).

== Satellite craters ==
By convention these features are identified on lunar maps by placing the letter on the side of the crater midpoint that is closest to Pictet.

Pictet	Latitude	Longitude	Diameter
A	45.0° S	7.9° W	34 km
C	42.7° S	7.7° W	7 km
D	46.0° S	9.0° W	21 km
E	41.3° S	7.7° W	70 km
F	42.8° S	6.3° W	11 km
N	41.5° S	8.1° W	7 km
