= Buch (crater) =

Crater on the Moon

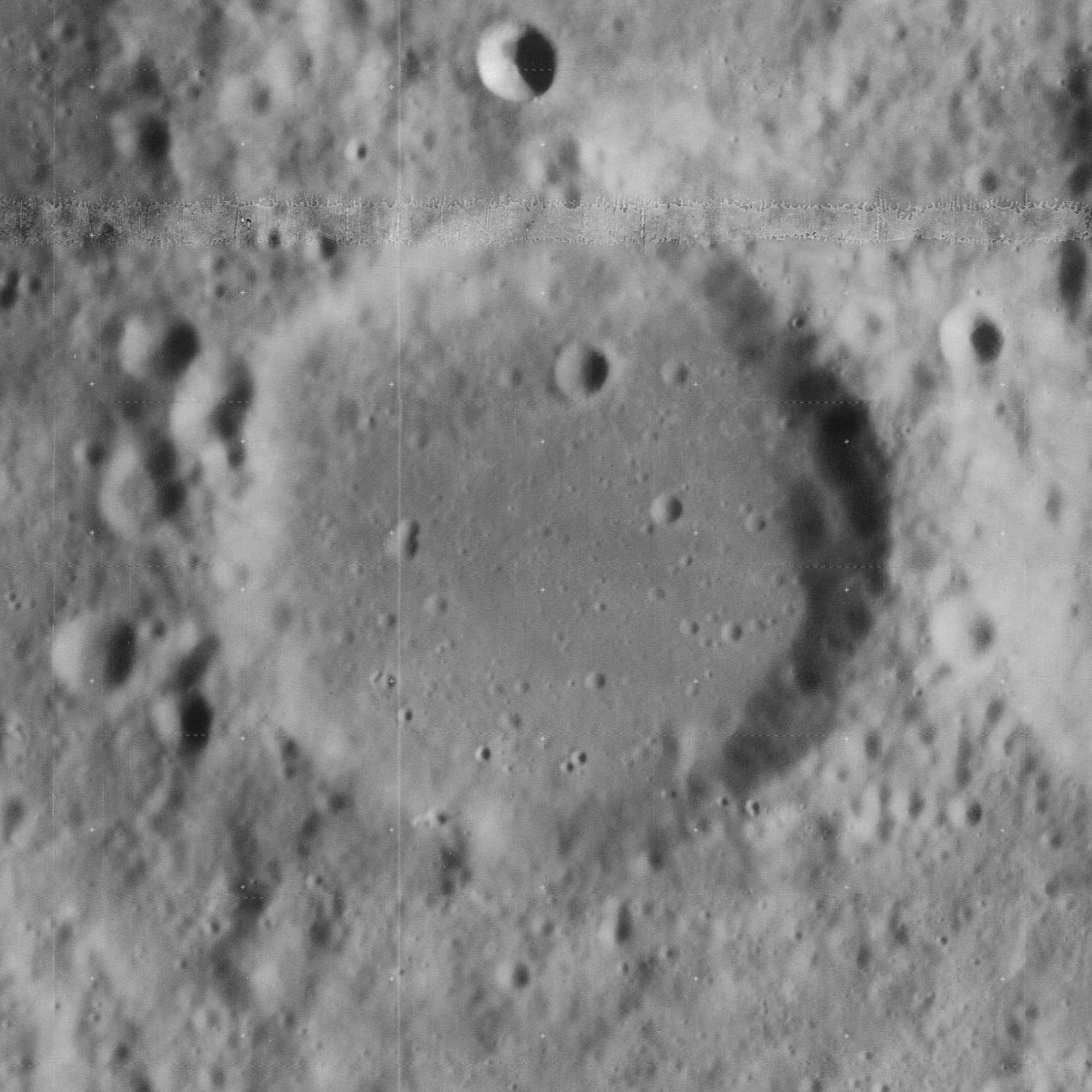
- Lunar Orbiter 4 image of Buch crater and surroundings with Buch B at top center
- Coordinates: 38.8°S 17.7°E
- Diameter: 51.31 km (31.88 mi)
- Depth: 1.4 km (0.87 mi)
- Colongitude: 343° at sunrise
- Eponym: Leopold von Buch

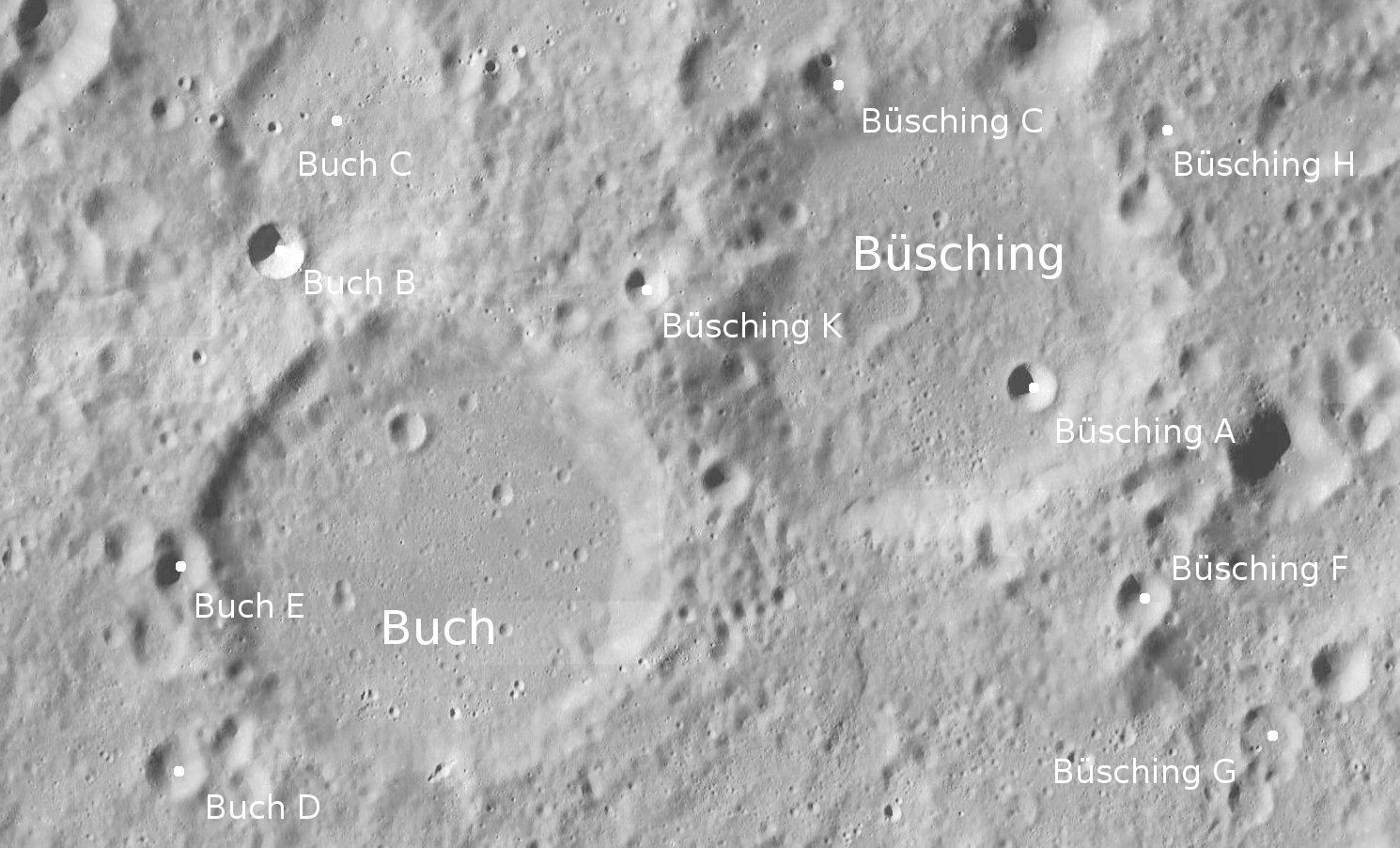
Map showing Buch and Büsching

Buch is an old, worn crater that is located in the rugged southern highlands of the Moon. It lies to the northeast of the large crater Maurolycus, and the comparably sized crater Büsching is attached to the northeast rim.

The crater rim is slightly elongated in the northeastern direction, and forms an egg-shaped depression in the surface. The rim has been eroded by many lesser impacts so that the edge is rounded and worn down, and the crater forms only a low depression in the ground. Within the crater the floor is relatively flat and featureless, with no central peak at the midpoint. There is a tiny crater near the northern inner wall.

It has been noted (by Shoemaker and others) that the satellite crater Buch B is unusual in that it possesses both a dark halo of material around the rim and appears to have formed some dark rays. Early speculation was that this may be volcanic in nature, but it was later demonstrated to be a typical impact crater that was formed over a pocket of darker material.

This formation is named after German geologist Leopold von Buch (1774-1853). Its name was incorporated into lunar nomenclature by German astronomer J. H. von Mädler during the 19th century. Its designation was formally adopted by the International Astronomical Union in 1935.

== Satellite craters ==
By convention these features are identified on lunar maps by placing the letter on the side of the crater midpoint that is closest to Buch.

Buch	Latitude	Longitude	Diameter
A	41.0° S	17.6° E	19 km
B	37.8° S	17.0° E	6 km
C	37.3° S	17.2° E	28 km
D	39.6° S	16.5° E	7 km
E	39.0° S	16.5° E	6 km

== Bright craterlet Buch B ==
Bright craterlet Buch B, northwest of Buch, dates to the Copernican period and has a meteoritic iron-rich impact melt. Due to the system of both high and low ejectarays around Buch B, the bright and eye-catching craterlet itself looks starlike during full moon. The appearance of the high and low albedo ejectarays is also noticeable on the photographic version of chart LAC 113 (page 226) in The Clementine Atlas of the Moon (Ben Bussey / Paul D. Spudis).
