= Pernette (given name) =

Pernette is a French given name. Notable people with the name include:

- Pernette Du Guillet
- Pernette Chaponnière (1915-2008), Swiss author
- Pernette Osinga (born 1967), Dutch fencer
- Christine Etiennette Pernette Jurine
- James Pernette deWolfe
- Jeanne-Pernette Schenker-Massot
- Christine Etiennette Pernette Jurine (1776–1812), Swiss scientific illustrator

== See also ==
- Pernette (surname)
