= William Allen Miller =

British scientist

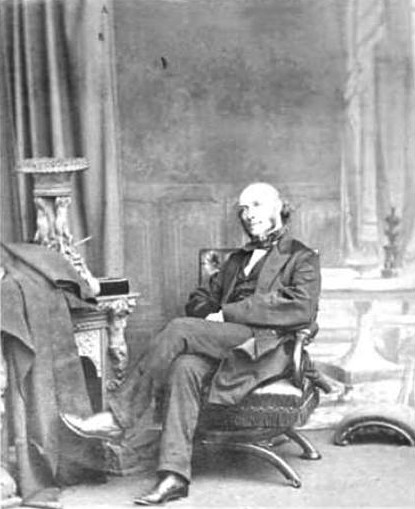
- William Allen Miller
- Born: 17 December 1817
- Died: 30 September 1870 (aged 52)
- Education: King's College London
- Awards: Gold Medal of the Royal Astronomical Society
- Scientific career
- Fields: Chemistry; Astronomy

Signature
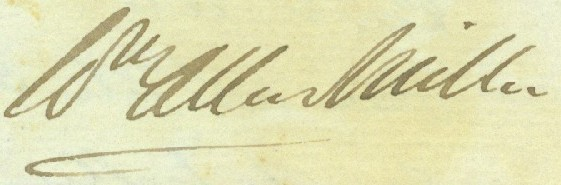

William Allen Miller FRS (17 December 1817 – 30 September 1870) was a British scientist.

== Life ==
Miller was born in Ipswich, Suffolk and educated at Ackworth School and King's College London. He was related to William Allen and first cousin to the leading suffragist Anne Knight.

On the death of John Frederic Daniell he succeeded to the Chair of Chemistry at King's. Although primarily a chemist, the scientific contributions for which Miller is mainly remembered today are in spectroscopy and astrochemistry, new fields in his time.

Miller wrote the textbook Elements of Chemistry, Theoretical and Practical, Part I Chemical Physics in 1855. In the preface he acknowledged the assistance of Charles Tomlinson.

He won the Gold Medal of the Royal Astronomical Society in 1867 jointly with William Huggins, for their spectroscopic study of the composition of stars. In 1845, he was elected a Fellow of the Royal Society.

In 1870 Miller had completed the manuscript for Introduction to the Study of Inorganic Chemistry when he fell ill. He passed it to Charles Tomlinson to prepare it for publication.

According to his obituary, Miller married Eliza Forrest of Birmingham in 1842. He died in 1870, a year after his wife, and they are both buried at West Norwood Cemetery. They were survived by a son and two daughters.

The crater Miller on the Moon is named after him.
