= Faraday (crater) =

Lunar impact crater

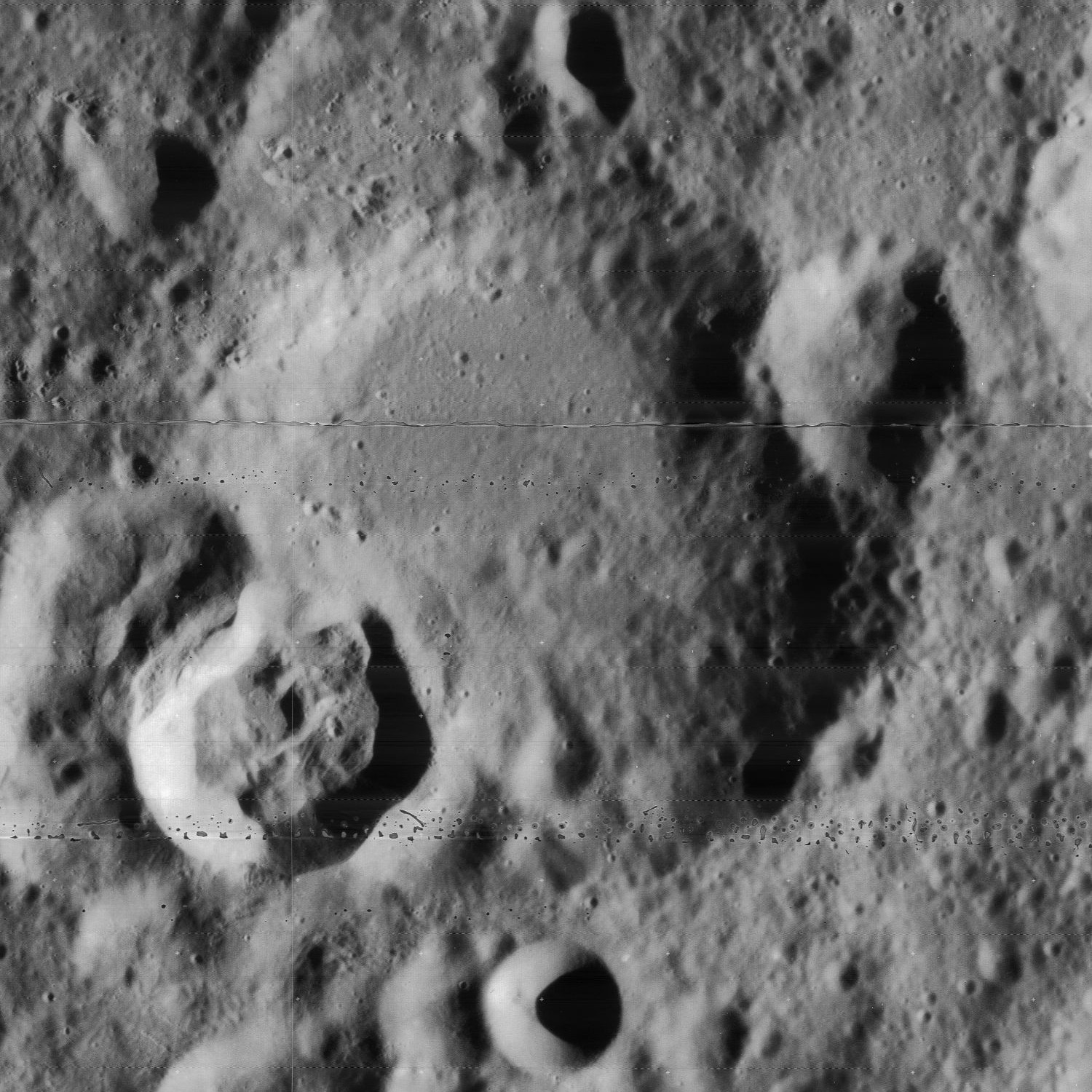
- Lunar Orbiter 4 image
- Coordinates: 42.4°S 8.7°E
- Diameter: 69.03 km (42.89 mi)
- Depth: 4.1 km (2.5 mi)
- Colongitude: 352° at sunrise
- Eponym: Michael Faraday

Faraday is an irregular lunar impact crater in the southern highlands of the Moon. It lies across the southeast rim of the larger crater Stöfler, and the northwest rim of Faraday forms a wide rampart across the otherwise flat floor of Stöfler. To the east of Faraday is Maurolycus.

The rim of Faraday has been significantly overlain by subsequent impacts, most notably by an overlapping pair across the southwest rim and a crater across the northwest rim. There is a low central ridge running from the southwest to the northeast, nearly dividing the crater floor in half. The floor is nearly flat in the northwest half.

This formation is named after British chemist and physicist Michael Faraday (1791-1867). His name was introduced with the lunar nomenclature of William R. Birt during the 19th century. Its designation was officially adopted by the International Astronomical Union in 1935.

== Satellite craters ==
By convention, these features are identified on lunar maps by placing the letter on the side of the crater midpoint that is closest to Faraday.

Faraday	Latitude	Longitude	Diameter
A	41.5° S	9.7° E	21 km
C	43.3° S	8.1° E	30 km
D	43.7° S	9.6° E	14 km
G	45.8° S	10.1° E	31 km
H	45.0° S	10.3° E	12 km

Due to its ray system, Faraday C is mapped as part of the Copernican System.
