= François Huber =

Swiss naturalist (1750–1831)

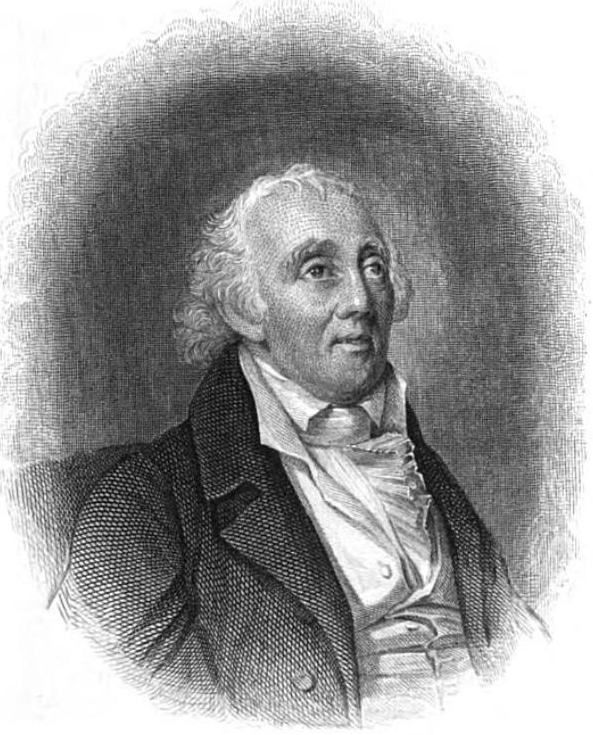
- Born: 2 July 1750; Geneva, Republic of Geneva
- Died: 22 December 1831 (aged 81); Lausanne, Switzerland
- Citizenship: Genevan, then Swiss (1815)
- Known for: Pioneer in the scientific knowledge of the life of the honey bee and its biology
- Notable work: Nouvelles Observations sur les Abeilles
- Spouse: Marie Aimée Lullin
- Children: Pierre Huber; Marie Anne Huber; Jean Huber
- Father: Jean Huber

François Huber (2 July 1750 – 22 December 1831), also known as Francis in English publications and Franz in German publications, was a Swiss entomologist who specialized in honey bees. His pioneering work was recognized all across Europe, and based on thorough observation with the help of several assistants due to his blindness.

== Life ==
=== Early life ===
François Huber was born in Geneva on 2 July 1750 in a well respected and well-off family of merchants and bankers with important ties to Geneva, Lyon and Paris. The Huber family had members in the highest institutions in the local community and was linked to other prominent local families. The family made significant contributions to the scientific and theological literature. His great-aunt, Marie Huber, was known as a voluminous writer on religious and theological subjects, and as the translator and epitomizer of The Spectator (Amsterdam, 3 vols., 1753). His father Jean Huber (1721–1786) was a prominent member of the coterie at Ferney. He was a well-known artist who left several portraits of Voltaire, who was a close friend. He was also interested in falcons, and his observations led him to publish on the subject.

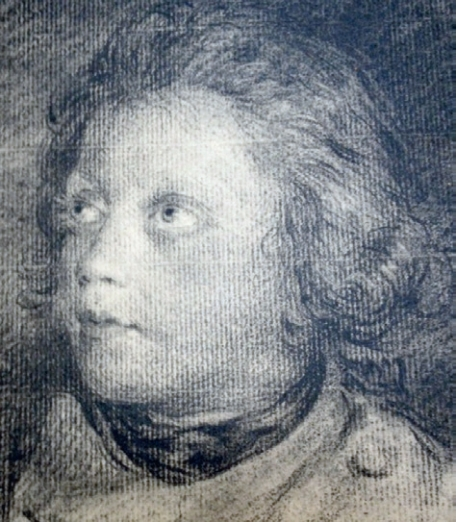
Portrait of young François Huber by his father, Jean Huber

From his early childhood, Francois was instructed in the field of literature as well as natural history, a passion he shared with his father. He attended the Collège de Saussure but his health soon deteriorated. His sight started failing at the age of fifteen. His father requested the assistance of Théodore Tronchin to treat him. He sent the young Huber to the village of Stains near Paris to recover. There, he lived the simple existence of a peasant away from the pressure of high society. The treatment was very successful for his health, and he had fond recollections of the simple life there and of the hospitality throughout his life.

However, his eyesight was considered incurable by the oculist Venzel, and he was facing total blindness. He had, however, already met Marie Aimée Lullin, the daughter of the syndics of the Swiss Republic. They had both been companions during dances and had grown up together. Her father refused to consent to their union because of his blindness, as he did not want his fortune to end in the hands of a blind man when his daughter inherited. However, Marie refused to abandon François and decided to wait until she was twenty-five, when she would be legally able to make that decision on her own. He could still see light and interact with others as if he could see. He later lost his sight completely, but throughout his life he would say: I have seen, I have seen with my own eyes when recalling his youth and when others described things to him.

=== Marriage ===
Marie resisted the pressures from her father to not marry this disabled man. She had, however, to wait to attain her majority, 25 years old at the time, in order to marry François. She walked down to the altar with François on 28 April 1776 with her maternal uncle, M. Rilliet Fatio, and married François Huber. She was 25 years and 23 days old. At her side was a close friend and confidant, Louise Eléonore Brière de Candolle, Augustin Pyramus de Candolle's mother. Marie later shared this story of her marriage to the young scientist, and in later life, she would honour him and recount his life after his death.

Marie became his reader, his secretary, and his observer, and she was very attentive in order to prevent any embarrassments in public that could have occurred from his disability. This strong, loving relationship was noticed by many, including Voltaire, who mentioned it in his correspondence, and it was an inspiration for Germaine de Staël when she described the Belmont family in her novel Delphine.

=== Early research ===
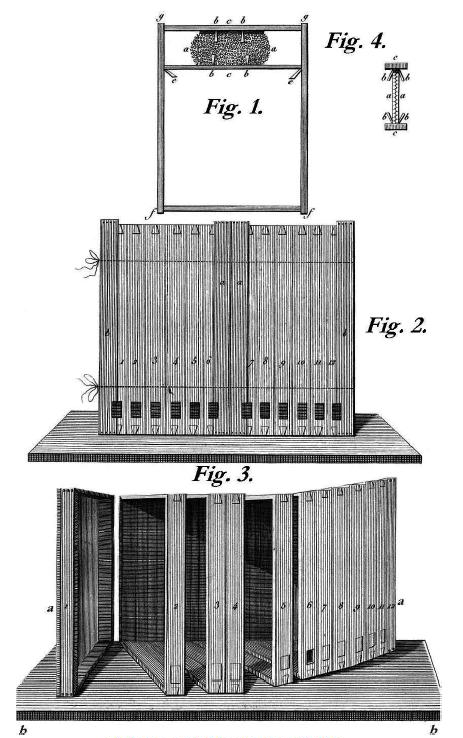
François Huber's Folio Hive

Huber became interested in honey bees after reading the works of René de Réaumur and Charles Bonnet. He also had a conversation with the latter, who was also based in Geneva. His curiosity was focused on the history of these insects. His initial desire was to verify some facts and then fill in missing information. Since he was now blind, he had to rely on the help of others. This included his wife but also his servant François Burnens, who was fully devoted to his master. François Burnens (1760–1837) was the son of peasants from Oulens-sous-Échallens from the Canton of Vaud who arrived in 1780. Huber taught him how to observe and directed him through questioning. He used his memories of his youth and the testimonials of his wife and friends.

Through his "observation", he discovered that the queen bee did not mate in the hive but in the air and detailed how the timing of this event was essential. He also confirmed the discovery by A. M. Schirach that bees are able to convert eggs into queens by the use of food (royal jelly) and that worker bees can also lay eggs. He described the battles between queens, the killing of drones at the end of the summer and what happens when a queen is replaced by a newly introduced queen. He also proved that bees used their antennae to communicate. He looked at the dimensions of the cells and how they influence the shape of the insects, the way the larvae spin silk to make their cocoons. He showed that queens are oviparous. He looked at the ways swarms formed and was the first to provide an accurate biological history of bee colonies.

These observations were made using a new type of hive in which each comb had glass sides, which Huber developed; these hives were the ancestors of our modern observation hives. Until then, hives had been circular and made of straw. These new hives opened as books with each frame visible to view. These allowed the team to observe the bees and follow them around. These discoveries would not have been possible without the skills and bravery of François Burnens, who was fully committed to discovering the truth. It is said that he would face the attacks of an entire hive just to learn a fact.

=== First publication ===
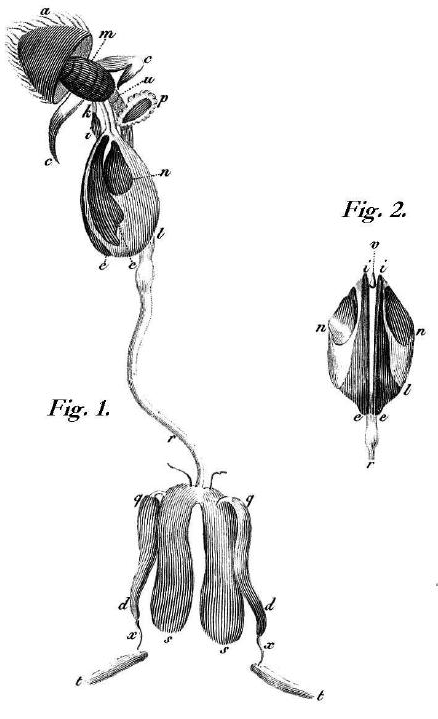
Drone Organs illustrated by Pierre Huber

The results of these observations were the publication of French: Nouvelles Observations sur les Abeilles ('New observations on bees') in Geneva in 1792. The 800-page volume was made of the letters that François had sent to Charles Bonnet, who happened to be his uncle. It was translated into English in 1806, and into German. It was very well received by the scientific community, not just because of the discoveries but also because he had overcome such a disability. He was also welcomed by most of the academies of Europe, especially the French Academy of Sciences. It influenced other scientists, including the renowned naturalist Charles Darwin, who owned a copy and made a commentary of the book in his famous On the Origin of Species. He also mentions Pierre Huber.

The poet Jacques Delille in his Chant VII, Règne Animal celebrated Huber's blindness and discovery:

Enfin, de leur hymen savant dépositaire,
L'aveugle Huber l'a vu par les regards d'autrui
Et sur ce grand problème un nouveau jour a lui.

=== Further research ===
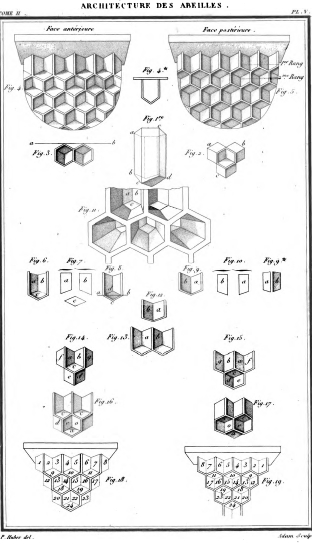
Drawing by Pierre Huber for his father's book

He started studying wax and its production. It had been speculated without sufficient proof that it came from the honey. He had already explained the origin of propolis and was able to determine through observation with Burnens that wax came out from between the rings of the abdomen as laminated sheets. These initial findings were published in Premier Mémoire sur l'origine de la Cire ('First memoir on the origin of wax') in 1804.

Burnens left in 1795 to go back to his village. There, he got married and became a farmer, along with becoming a local judge. Marie-Aimée assisted Huber but he also started training his son, Pierre Huber. He started his apprenticeship with his father as an observer. He would go on to publish his own books, not on bees but on ants. With this new assistant by his side, he was able to continue his research and in 1814, published a second edition edited in part by his son. Further findings on wax were published in his second edition. Huber was also helped by Christine Jurine, who dissected bees for him and discovered the ovaries of the working bees.

He studied the damage caused by the Sphinx atropos in hives, and looked into the question of smell and its importance in the hive. He also studied the respiratory system of bees. He was able to prove that bees consume oxygen like other animals. This begged the question of how they survived with such a large population in enclosed hives with only a small entrance for fresh air. He was able to prove for the first time that bees used their wings to circulate the air, creating adequate ventilation. In order to analyse the air, he worked with Jean Senebier, another Geneva scientist who was researching this question with regard to vegetables. The two became friends, and they published the Mémoires sur l'Influence de l'Air et de Diverses Substances Gazeuses dans la Germination de Différentes Graines ('Memoirs on the Influence of Air and of Various Gaseous Substances on the Germination of Different Seeds') in which they demonstrated the need for oxygen in germination.

=== Last years ===
Francois Huber spent his last years in Lausanne being cared for by his daughter, Marie Anne de Molin. He continued some of his research and remained curious. He was interested in the discovery of stingless bees near Tampico in Mexico by Captain Hall. He was given some samples by Professor Prevost and, later, a full colony. He was said to have kept his mental capacity to the end. Those who were close to him said he was loving and beloved to the end. On 20 December, he wrote to a friend:

There is a time when it is impossible to remain neglectful; it is, when separating gradually from each other, we may reveal to those we love, all that esteem, tenderness, and gratitude, have inspired us with towards them. [...] I say to you alone that resignation and serenity are blessings which have not been refused.

He died two days later on 22 December 1831 in the arms of his daughter.

== Publications ==
- Nouvelles Observations sur les Abeilles, adressé à Charles Bonnet (First Edition) published in one volume in 1792 in Geneva. Reprinted in 1796. The English translation was published in London in 1806.
- Mémoires sur l'Influence de l'Air et de Diverses Substances Gazeuses dans la Germination de Différentes Graines (Geneva, 1801) co-published with Jean Senebier.
- Premier Mémoire sur l'origine de la Cire (1804)
- Mémoire sur la construction des cellules (1804) in the Journal Nicholson and republished in 1814.
- Lettre de Mr. Huber au Prof. Pictet sur certains dangers que courent les Abeilles dans leurs ruches, et sur les moyens de les en préserver (Geneva, October 29, 1804) This is a letter that was published.
- Nouvelles Communications relatives au sphinx atropos et à l'industrie des abeilles à s'en défendre (27 November 1804) This is a letter that was published as a follow-up to the previous letter.
- Nouvelles Observations sur les Abeilles (Second Edition) published in two volumes in 1814 in Geneva and Paris. This publication was edited by his son, Pierre Huber.
- Lettres inédites de François Huber pour faire suite aux Nouvelles Observations (sur les Abeilles) published posthumously in 1897 in Nyon (Switzerland) edited by Edouard Bertrand and published in La Revue Internationale d'Apiculture. These letters were sent by Huber to his young cousin, Elisa de Portes, who was interested in his work. She kept the letters for most of her life until giving them to Mr. Bertrand to be published.

== Legacy ==
- Augustin de Candolle who was a close family friend and one of the first biographers, gave François Huber's name to a genus of Brazilian trees Huberia, including Huberia laurina. It is a 3 metres (9.8 ft) shrub with light green fruits that grows on rocky summits with soil-filled crevices and small areas of white sand at an elevation of 1,100 metres (3,600 ft).
- A book was published in Paris in 1829 titled Fragments d'Hubert sur les abeilles with an introduction by Dr. Mayranx. It is unclear if François Huber or Pierre Huber was involved in this publication, but the last name is misspelt throughout.
- A novel by Sara George The Beekeeper's Pupil was published in 2002, inspired by the team of Huber and Burnens. It is written as the fictional journal of François Burnens from his arrival at the Huber household at the age of 19 years old in 1784 to his departure 10 years later in 1794. Her novel is based on the writings of Huber but also those of Augustin de Candolle. A French version was published in 2018 in Geneva by Slatkine.

François Huber has been largely forgotten not only in the Geneva local history but also in the beekeeping community in spite of his discoveries having been unchallenged for over two centuries.
