= Stöfler (crater) =

Crater on the Moon

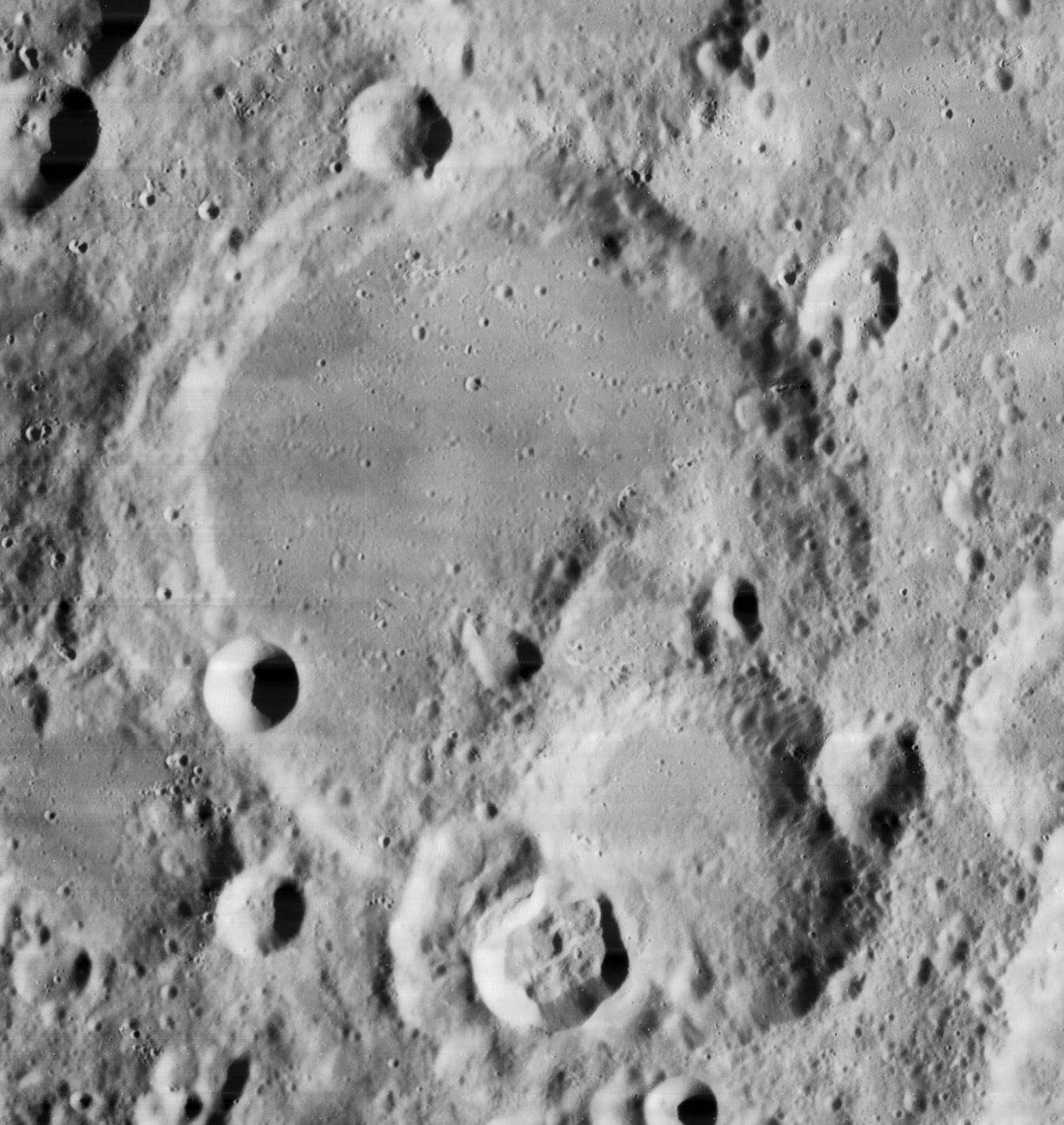
- Lunar Orbiter 4 image of Stofler, with Faraday on the southeast rim
- Coordinates: 41.1°S 6.0°E
- Diameter: 126 km
- Depth: 2.8 km
- Colongitude: 354° at sunrise
- Formation: Pre-Nectarian
- Eponym: Johannes Stöffler

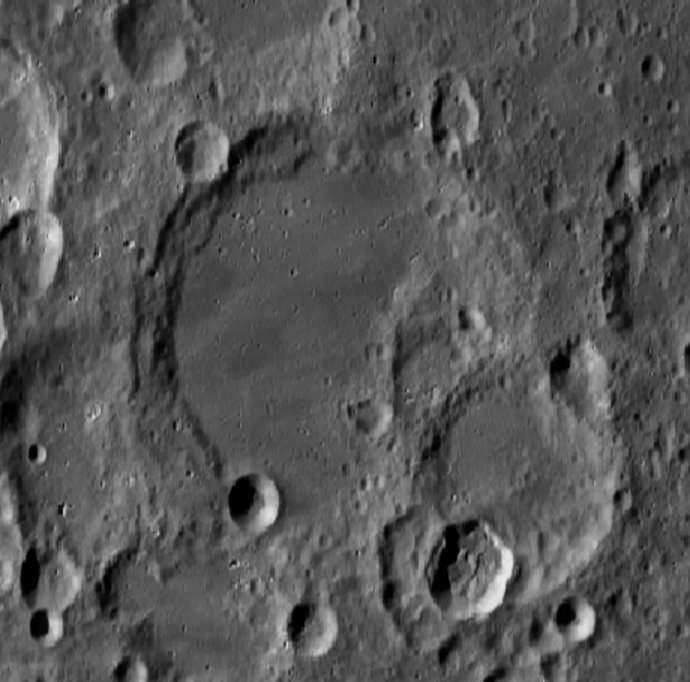
LRO image

Stöfler is a large lunar impact crater located in the crater-dotted southern highlands of the Moon. British astronomer T. W. Webb noted it "has a very level interior, crossed by two rays from Tycho, and containing at least 16 minute craters. It is well seen about [1st] Quarter." Stöffler sits to the west of the crater Maurolycus. The distorted crater Fernelius is attached to the northern rim, and Miller and Nasireddin lie to the west. Faraday has overlain and damaged the western rim, and this crater in turn has been overlain by several smaller craters.

This crater is the site of a magnetic anomaly. The rim of Stöfler is worn and eroded, but the outline remains relatively intact except where overlain by Faraday. The smaller Stöfler K intrudes into the northwestern rim, and Stöfler F forms an indentation into the base of the southwestern interior wall.

The crater floor has been filled in with deposits, either from lava flows or ejecta from basin impacts, and is relatively flat and featureless in the northwest half. If there was a central peak, it has now become buried. The floor has a low albedo, making the crater relatively easy to identify as it is one of the few craters in this region of the lunar surface that has a dark floor. Traces of bright ray material from Tycho, located to the west, can be seen across the floor.

This crater was named after the German astronomer and mathematician Johannes Stöffler (1452-1531). Its designation was formally adopted by the International Astronomical Union in 1935.

== Satellite craters ==
By convention these features are identified on lunar maps by placing the letter on the side of the crater midpoint that is closest to Stöfler.

Stöfler	Latitude	Longitude	Diameter
D	43.8° S	4.3° E	54 km
E	43.8° S	5.8° E	16 km
F	42.7° S	4.9° E	18 km
G	43.4° S	2.0° E	20 km
H	40.3° S	1.7° E	27 km
J	42.2° S	2.4° E	76 km
K	39.4° S	4.2° E	19 km
L	39.1° S	7.8° E	17 km
M	41.0° S	8.1° E	9 km
N	41.9° S	6.6° E	14 km
O	43.3° S	1.3° E	9 km
P	43.2° S	7.3° E	33 km
R	42.2° S	1.8° E	6 km
S	44.9° S	5.8° E	9 km
T	39.7° S	8.2° E	5 km
U	40.1° S	9.6° E	5 km
X	40.5° S	5.5° E	3 km
Y	39.9° S	5.5° E	3 km
Z	40.3° S	3.2° E	4 km
