= Marc-Auguste Pictet =

Genevan scientific journalist (1752–1825)

Marc-Auguste Pictet FRS FRSE
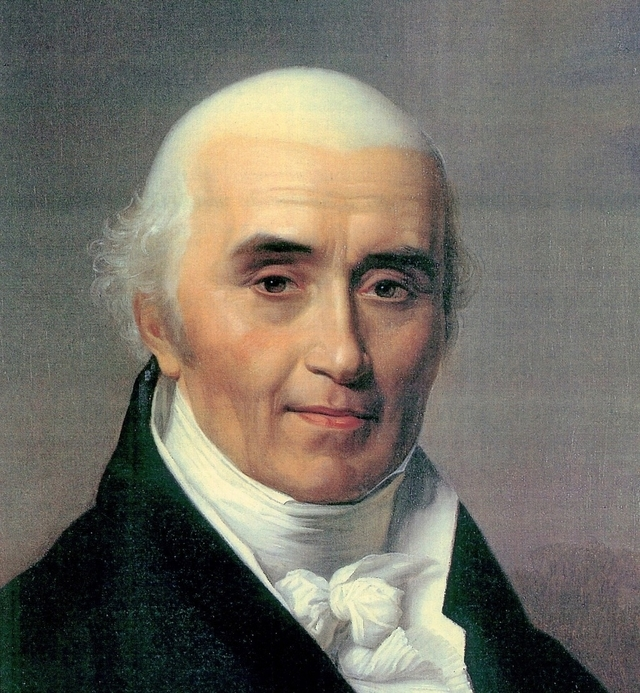
- Portrait by Firmin Massot, 1809
- Born: 23 July 1752; Geneva, Republic of Geneva
- Died: 19 April 1825 (aged 72); Geneva, Switzerland
- Education: Academy of Geneva
- Known for: Pictet's experiment
- Spouse: Susanne Francoise Turrettini (m. 1766)
- Children: 3
- Family: Pictet family
- Awards: FRS (1791); FRSE (1796)

Marc-Auguste Pictet FRS FRSE (French: [piktɛ]; 23 July 1752 – 19 April 1825) was a Genevan scientific journalist and experimental natural philosopher.

Pictet's main contribution to learning was his editing of the scientific section of the Bibliothèque Britannique (1796–1815), a publication devoted to the diffusion on the Continent of knowledge and arts produced in Great Britain. His own scientific research focused on the fields of physical science, especially calorimetry, but also astronomy, geology, meteorology and technology, especially chronometry and the manufacture of fine earthenware.

== Life ==
He was born in Geneva, Republic of Geneva on 23 July 1752, the son of Charles Pictet, a military officer serving in the mercenary troops of the Netherlands, and his wife, Marie Dunant.

Marc-Auguste studied natural philosophy and law at the Academy of Geneva and qualified as a lawyer in 1774. After one year in England (1775–76), he became assistant to Jacques-André Mallet at the Geneva Observatory and took an interest in meteorology and map-making. In 1778, he made his first trip around the Mont-Blanc with his master Horace-Bénédict de Saussure. In 1786, he would succeed him as professor of natural philosophy at the Academy of Geneva.

By this time, he had assisted Saussure with an experiment that demonstrated the existence of what would later be called infra-red radiation. In a follow-up experiment, named 'Pictet's experiment' by Count Rumford, Pictet discovered that by focusing the radiation from a flask of ice onto a thermometer using two concave mirrors, the effects of cold could be reflected in the same way as the effects of heat. The result of his experiments on heat was published in 1790 as Essai sur le feu (English translation: An Essay on Fire, 1791). At this time he had already converted to Lavoisier's ideas on chemistry.

In 1791, Pictet was one of the twelve founding members of the Geneva Society of Physics and Natural History. In 1796, he, his younger brother Charles, and his friend Frédéric-Guillaume Maurice began editing a monthly periodical entitled Bibliothèque Britannique, which carried translations of significant scientific papers published in English by scholars such as Davy, Hall, Herschel, Leslie, Playfair, Rumford and Wollaston. In addition to scientific and technical topics, the journal published extracts of British literature and articles on agriculture. After 1815, this periodical included other European materials (mainly French, German and Italian) and took from then on the name of Bibliothèque Universelle de Genève.

As the second director of the Geneva Observatory (1790–1819), Pictet oversaw the installation of a meteorological station. In 1817, he established an additional station on Great St. Bernard mountain in the Alps.

In 1815, the year Geneva adhered to the Swiss Confederation, Pictet, Henri-Albert Gosse and Jakob Samuel Wyttenbach were the main agents in the creation of the Swiss Society of Natural Sciences.

Pictet was a Fellow of the Royal Society of London from 1791, a Fellow of the Royal Society of Edinburgh from 1796, an "associé libre" of the Académie des Sciences from 1802, and a member of the Bavarian Academy of Sciences and Humanities from 1808. His expertise, relationships and correspondence network included hundreds of scholars, extending throughout Western Europe and as far as the United States. In a letter to President George Washington in 1795, Thomas Jefferson wrote that he saw Pictet and his colleagues (including Saussure and Senebrier) as "standing foremost among the literati of Europe".

== Legacy ==
Since 1990, the Geneva Society of Physics and Natural History has offered a yearly award in history of science called the Marc-Auguste Pictet Prize. It also awards a yearly medal to "a scholar whose work is recognized as an authority in the history of science". Winners are chosen by a panel of University of Geneva professors and field experts.

The lunar crater Pictet was named in his honour in 1935 by astronomers Blagg and Müller.

== Family ==
In 1766, he married Susanne Francoise Turrettini (1757–1811). The couple had three daughters: Dorothée Marie Anne (1777–1841), who married the Swiss Councillor of State Isaac Vernet, Caroline (1780–1841) and Albertine (1785–1834).

== See also ==
- Jean Rilliet, Jean Cassaigneau, Marc-Auguste Pictet ou le rendez-vous de l’Europe universelle, 1752–1825, Genève, Slatkine, 1995 (ISBN 9782051013475) (OCLC 36520875) 784 p.
- Jean-Daniel Candaux, Histoire de la famille Pictet 1474–1974, Genève, Braillard, 1974.
