= Pictet's experiment =

1790 demonstration of reflection of heat

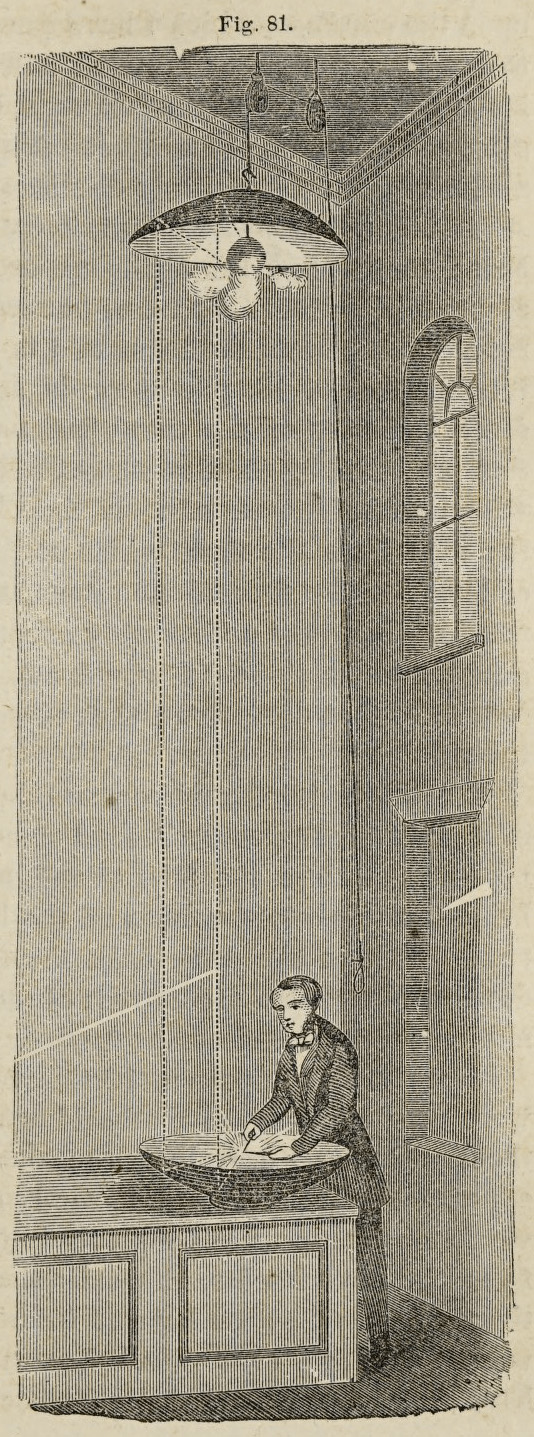
Tyndall's illustration of the experiment

Pictet's experiment is the demonstration of the reflection of heat and the apparent reflection of cold in a series of experiments performed in 1790 (reported in English in 1791 in An Essay on Fire) by Marc-Auguste Pictet—ten years before the discovery of infrared heating of the Earth by the Sun. The apparatus for most of the experiments used two concave mirrors facing one another at a distance. An object placed at the focus of one mirror would have heat and light reflected by the mirror and focused. An object at the focus of the counterpart mirror would do the same. Placing a hot object at one focus and a thermometer at the other would register an increase in temperature on the thermometer. This was sometimes demonstrated with the explosion of a flammable mix of gases in a blackened balloon, as described and depicted by John Tyndall in 1863.

After "demonstrating that radiant heat, even when it was not accompanied by any light, could be reflected and focused like light", Pictet used the same apparatus to demonstrate the apparent reflection of cold in a similar manner. This demonstration was important to Benjamin Thompson, Count Rumford who argued for the existence of "frigorific rays" conveying cold. Rumford's continuation of the experiments and promotion of the topic caused the name to be attached to the experiment.

The apparent reflection of cold if a cold object is placed in one focus surprised Pictet and two scholars writing about the experiment in 1985 noted "most physicists, on seeing it demonstrated for the first time, find it surprising and even puzzling." The confusion may be resolved by understanding that all objects in the system—including the thermometer—are constantly radiating heat. Pictet described this as "the thermometer acts the same part relatively to the snow as the bullet [heat source] in relation to the thermometer." Addition of a very cold object adds an effective heat sink versus a room temperature object which would not, in the net, cool or warm a thermometer in the other focus.

== Modern replications and demonstrations ==
There are relatively few published examples of demonstrations or recreation of the experiment. Two physicists in the University of Washington system reported on demonstrations to students and colleagues and produced directions for re-creating the experiment in 1985 as part of an investigation into the role of the experiment in the history of physics. Physicists at Sofia University in Bulgaria reported on reproducing the experiment for high school students in 2017.
