= Jean Huber =

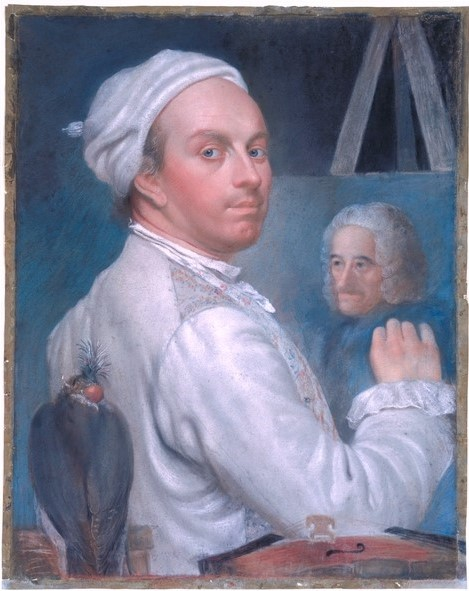
- Self-portrait by Huber while painting a portrait of Voltaire, 1773
- Born: 13 February 1721; Chambésy, Republic of Geneva
- Died: 21 August 1786 (aged 65); Lausanne, Swiss Confederacy
- Children: François Huber

Jean Huber (13 February 1721 – 21 August 1786) was a Genevan painter, silhouettiste, soldier, politician and author, who was a citizen of the Republic of Geneva.

== Biography ==
Huber was born in Chambésy (part of Pregny-Chambésy) to Jacob Huber, a member of the "Two-Hundreds" council of the Republic of Geneva, and Catherine Vasserot. The family came from Schaffhausen originally and was admitted into the Geneva bourgeoisie in 1654.

In 1738, Huber entered the Hesse-Kassel military service in Prince Frederick's Grenadier regiment, then in 1741 he transferred to the Piedmont-Sardinia service where he fought with the rank of captain during the war of the Austrian Succession.

In 1747, he married Marie-Louise Alléon-Guainieret. There were two sons: François Huber (1750–1831), the celebrated author of a work on bees, and Jean-Daniel, paysagiste and amateur engraver, and also one daughter named Madelaine. In 1752, Huber was made a member of the "Two-Hundreds" council. Jean Huber died in Lausanne in 1786.

=== Painter and silhouettiste ===
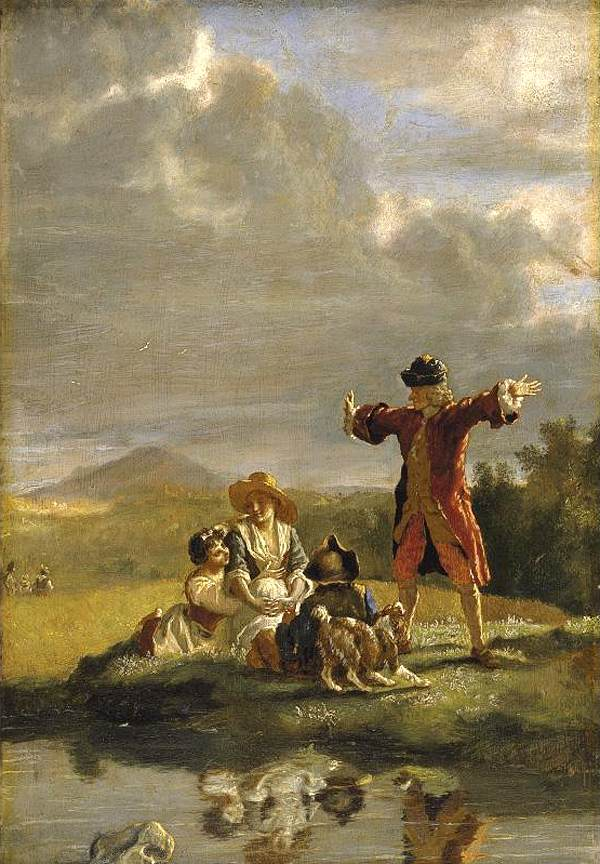
Voltaire narrating a fable

Huber started painting without having had any training. He was a talented observer, and his first works were of horses and scenes of hunting, of birds in particular. In 1783, he published in the "Mercure de France" a "Note on the Way of Steering Balloons, based on the Flight of Birds of Prey", then in 1784, "Observations on the Flight of Birds of Prey" (Geneva 1784) with 7 plates designed by him. He was working on a "History of Birds of Prey" when he died.

Huber also had talents as a caricaturist, which he used on a number of occasions, and particularly against Liotard. He visited Voltaire at "Les Délices" in 1756 and became part of the Ferney set. He painted numerous pictures representing Philosophy, and dedicated a collection of his portraits to Catherine II of Russia.

He was with Voltaire for twenty years and was given the nickname of Huber-Voltaire. Voltaire wrote in 1772 to Madame du Deffand: "Since you have seen Monsieur Huber, he will do your portrait; he will do it in pastel, in oils, or in mezzotint. With scissors he will make a cutout sketch of you as a complete caricature. This is the way he ridiculed me from one end of Europe to the other."

In Geneva, he popularised the art of the silhouette and worked without even making an initial sketch. His talent for cutouts allowed him to create the most complicated scenes of fights and chases; sometimes he would produce thick forests, leaving distant plains and mountains to be imagined; his illustrations showed inimitable fine details. Most of his cutouts are in England, in private galleries. His "scenes of" made him famous, as well as his irreverent caricatures of Voltaire.

In 1761, a silhouette that Huber had created of Anne FitzRoy, Duchess of Grafton and her daughter was sent to Horace Walpole. This letter was to be the start of a correspondence of 455 letters.

Huber produced various works in pastel, including his self-portrait, which is in the Lausanne museum. J J Rigaud wrote of him, "The reproduction of Voltaire's features was so familiar to Huber that he could draw his profile without having his eyes fixed on the paper, or with his hands behind his back, or even without scissors, by tearing a card. The joke of doing his dog with a profile of Voltaire, while giving it a crust of bread to eat, gave Huber almost as much fame as his serious works."
