= Johannes Stöffler =

German astronomer

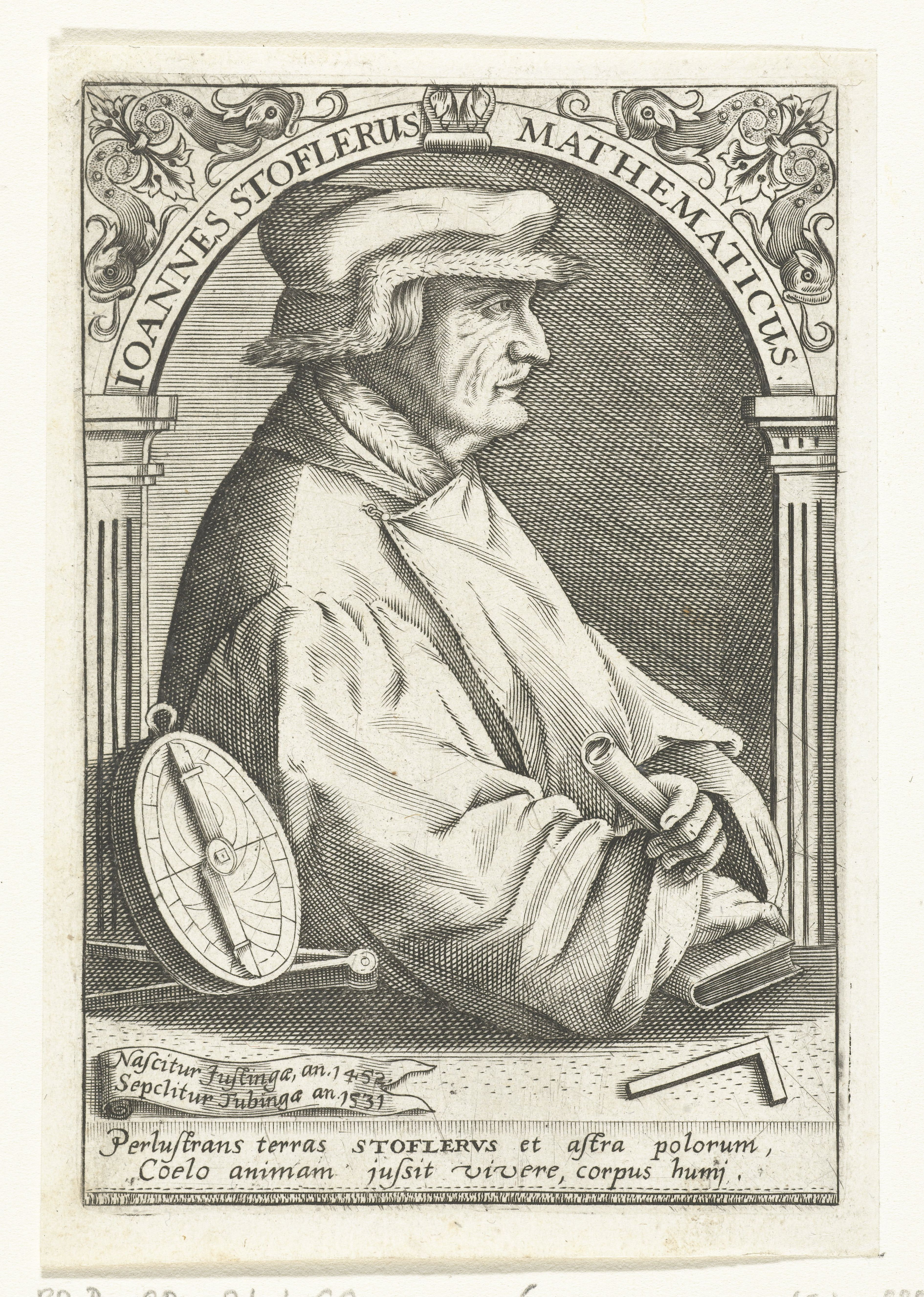
- 1598 engraving
- Born: December 10, 1452; Schelklingen
- Died: February 16, 1531; Blaubeuren
- Education: University of Ingolstadt
- Occupations: Mathematician, astronomer, astrologer, and priest
- Employer: University of Tübingen

Johannes Stöffler (also Stöfler, Stoffler, Stoeffler; 10 December 1452 – 16 February 1531) was a German mathematician, astronomer, astrologer, priest, maker of astronomical instruments and professor at the University of Tübingen.

== Life ==
Johannes Stöffler was born on 10 December 1452 in Justingen (now part of Schelklingen) on the Swabian Alb. Having received his basic education at the Blaubeuren monastery school, he registered at the newly founded University of Ingolstadt on 21 April 1472, where he was consequently promoted Baccalaureus in September 1473 and Magister in January 1476. After finishing his studies he obtained the parish of Justingen where he, besides his clerical obligations, concerned himself with astronomy, astrology and the making of astronomical instruments, clocks and celestial globes. He conducted a lively correspondence with leading humanists - for example, Johannes Reuchlin, for whom he made an equatorium and wrote horoscopes.

In 1499, Stöffler predicted that a deluge would cover the world on 20 February 1524. In 1507, at the instigation of Duke Ulrich I, he received the newly established chair of mathematics and astronomy at the University of Tübingen, where he excelled in rich teaching and publication activities and finally was elected rector in 1522. By the time of his appointment, he already enjoyed a virtual monopoly in ephemeris-making in collaboration with Jacob Pflaum, continuing the calculations of Regiomontanus through 1531, and then through 1551, the latter being published posthumously in 1531.

His treatise on the construction and the use of the astrolabe, entitled Elucidatio fabricae ususque astrolabii, was published in several editions and served astronomers and surveyors for a long time as a standard work.

Philipp Melanchthon and Sebastian Münster rank among his most famous students. Stöffler died of the plague in Blaubeuren on 16 February 1531 after an epidemic forced the division and relocation of his university to the surrounding countryside in 1530. He was buried in the choir of the collegiate church (Stiftskirche) in Tübingen.

== Works ==
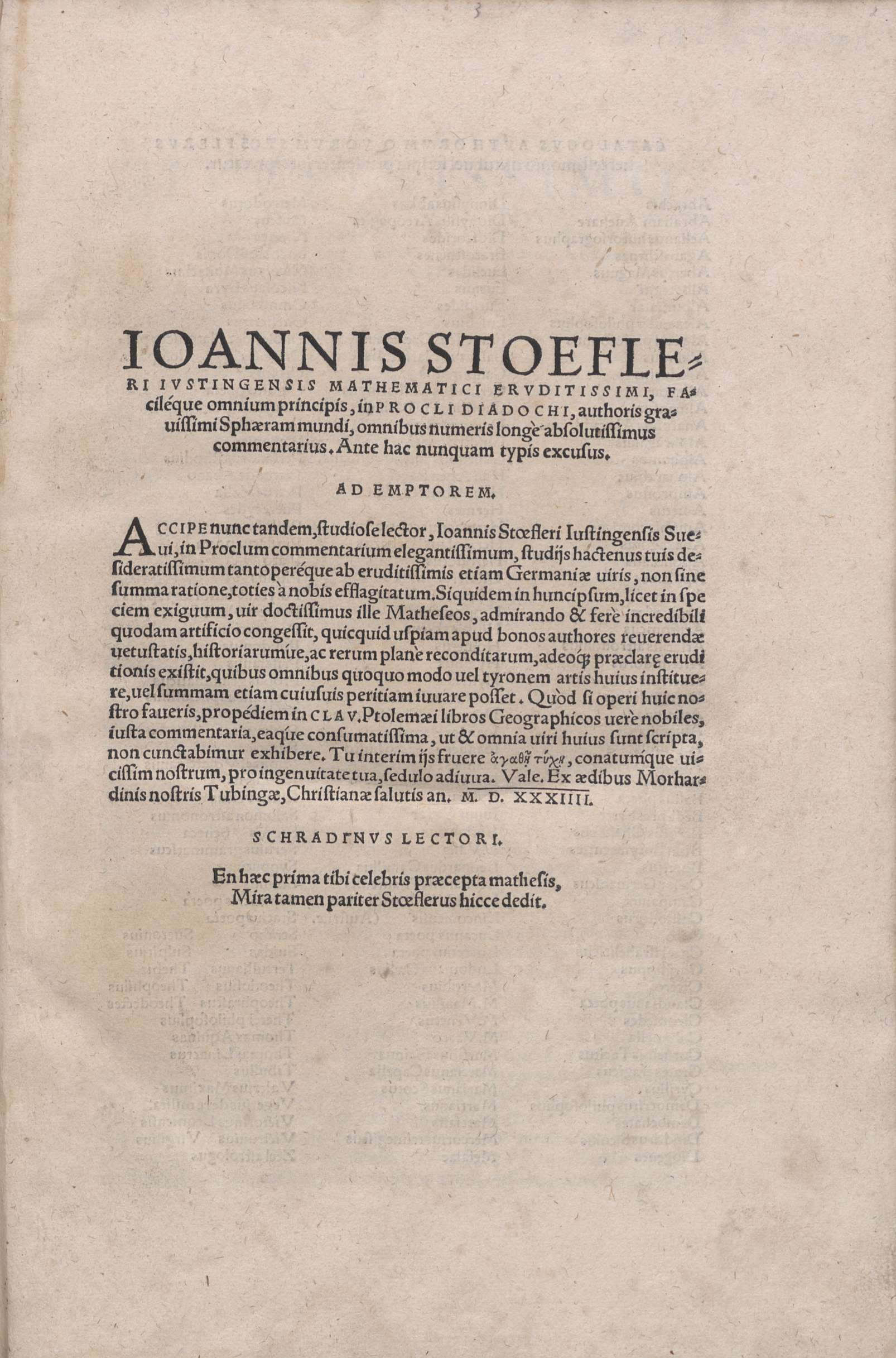
Omnium principis In Procli Diadochi omnibus numeris longà absolutissimus commentarius, 1534

- 1493: A celestial globe for the Bishop of Konstanz. This globe, as the sole remaining and most important object of his workshop, is exhibited at the Landesmuseum Württemberg in the Old Castle in Stuttgart.
- 1496: An astronomical clock for the Minster of Konstanz.
- 1498: A celestial globe for the Bishop of Worms.
- 1499: An almanac (Almanach nova plurimis annis venturis inserentia) published in collaboration with the astronomer Jacob Pflaum of Ulm, which was designated as a continuation of the ephemeris of Regiomontanus. It had a large circulation, underwent 13 editions until 1551 and exerted a strong effect on Renaissance astronomy.
- 1512 - 1514: Commentary on Ptolemy's Geography. Unpublished manuscript with comments on books 1 and 2 of the Geography, preserved at the University of Tübingen; the remaining commentaries were lost in a fire in 1534.
- 1513: A book on the construction and use of the astrolabe (Elucidatio fabricae ususque astrolabii), published in 16 editions up until 1620, and, in 2007, for the first time in English.
- 1514: Astronomical tables (Tabulae astronomicae).
- 1518: A proposal for a calendar revision (Calendarium romanum magnum) which formed a foundation for the Gregorian calendar.
- 1532 Ephemeridum opus a capite anni Redemptoris Christi 1532 in alios 20 proxime subsequentes (in Latin). Venezia: Peter Liechtenstein. 1532.
- 1534 (posthumously published): Commentary on the Sphaera of pseudo-Proclus (Ioannis Stoefleri Iustingensis mathematici eruditissimi, faciléque omnium principis, in Procli Diadochi, authoris grauissimi Sphæram mundi, omnibus numeris longè absolutissimus commentarius)
- 1534 Omnium principis In Procli Diadochi omnibus numeris longà absolutissimus commentarius (in Latin). Tübingen: Urlich Morhart (1.). 1534.

== Legacy ==
The lunar crater "Stöfler" (with one f) was named in his honour.
