= Marie Huber =

Marie Huber (4 March 1695 – 13 June 1753) was a Genevan writer on theology and related subjects, as well as a translator and editor, at a time when it was rare for a female writer to write about theology.

Huber was a proponent of universalism, and was considered by some a deist. Her Letters Concerning the Religion Essential to Man (1761) are known to have been read, in translation, by Robert Burns.

She was one of 15 children, and was the great-aunt of François Huber, the naturalist.

== Works ==
- Écrit sur le Jeu et les plaisirs (original work lost, summarised by Gustave Metzger in Marie Huber), 1722
- Le Monde fou préféré au monde sage, en vingt-quatre promenades de trois amis, Criton philosophe, Philon avocat, Eraste négociant (Amsterdam/Geneva, J. Wetsteins et W. Smith/Fabri et Barrillot, 1731)
- Sentimens differens de quelques théologiens sur l'état des âmes séparées des corps en quatorze lettres (1731)
- Le Monde fou préféré au monde sage, en vingt-quatre promenades de trois amis, Criton philosophe, Philon avocat, Eraste négociant, nouvelle édition, augmentée de deux lettres (Amsterdam/Geneva, Wetsteins et Smith/Fabri et Barrillot, 1733)
- Le Sisteme des anciens et des modernes, concilié par l'exposition des sentimens differens de quelques théologiens sur l'état des âmes séparées des corps. En quatorze lettres, nouvelle édition, augmentée par des notes & quelques pièces nouvelles (Amsterdam/Geneva, Wetsteins et Smith/Fabri et Barrillot, 1733)
- Le Sisteme des anciens et des modernes, concilié par l'exposition des sentimens differens de quelques théologiens sur l'état des âmes séparées des corps. En quatorze lettres et Suite de ce livre servant de réponse à l'examen de l'origénisme (Amsterdam, 1733)
- Lettres sur la religion essentielle à l'homme, distinguée de ce qui n'en est que l'accessoire (Amsterdam, J. Wetsteins et W. Smith, 1738)
- Le sisteme des théologiens anciens et modernes, concilié par l'exposition des differens sentimens sur l'état des âmes séparées des corps. En quatorze lettres. (London, 1739)
- Lettres sur la religion essentielle à l'homme, distinguée de ce qui n'en est que l'accessoire (London/Lausanne, 1739)
- Le Monde fou préféré au monde sage, en vingt-six promenades de trois amis, Criton philosophe. Philon avocat. Eraste négociant, (London and Geneva, Barrillot et fils, 1744)
- Recueil de diverses pièces servant de supplément aux lettres sur la religion essentielle à l'homme (Berlin, E. de Bourdeaux, 1754)
- Lettres sur la religion essentielle à l'homme, distinguée de ce qui n'en est que l'accessoire (London, 1756)
- Le Sisteme des anciens et des modernes... (Suite..., servant de réponse au livre intitulé, Examen de l'Origenisme par... R. Sur le poinct d'honneur mal entendu des écrivains en deux lettres) (London, 1757)
