= Marie-Aimée Lullin =

Swiss entomologist

- Born: 5 April 1751
- Died: 25 January 1822 (aged 70)
- Occupations: Reader, secretary and observer
- Spouse: François Huber (1750-1831)
- Children: Pierre Huber (1777-1840), Marie Anne Huber (1779-1871), Jean Huber (1785-1839)
- Parents: Pierre Lullin (1712-1789) (father); Sarah Rilliet (1723-1751) (mother)

Marie-Aimée Lullin (5 April 1751 – 25 January 1822) was the transcriber and observer for her husband, a highly regarded entomologist who became blind at an early age.

== Life ==
Lullin was the daughter of Pierre Lullin (1712–1789), who served as syndic of Geneva, and Sarah Rilliet (1723–1751).

She married François Huber (1750–1831), the famous blind entomologist, on 28 April 1776 in Geneva, Republic of Geneva after having to wait seven years to do so. Lullin had become friends with Huber at 17 when they were dance partners, but Lullin's father would not allow her to marry, at so young an age, a man with failing eyesight. Instead of abandoning Huber, she decided to wait until she had attained the age of 25, when she was legally allowed choose a husband despite the disapproval of her father. Their marriage was such a love story that they were the inspiration for the novel Delphine by Germaine de Staël and was noticed by Voltaire in their correspondence. Lullin stood with her husband as a life-long partner and helped to alleviate his blindness where she could, so that he never truly felt misfortune in being blind.

They had three children together: Pierre Huber (1777–1840), Marie Anne Huber (1779–1871) who married Samuel de Molin, and Jean Huber (1785–1839). Her death in 1822 affected her husband deeply, causing him to slow down, under the care of their daughter, Marie Anne.

Lullin was described as having a small stature while also being incredibly full of life, so much that Huber would apply the same characteristics of the bees to his wife. Her husband's description of her was Latin: mens magna in corpore parvo, which translates to 'great mind in a small body'. Huber then applied this description to the bees, describing them with the phrase, Ingentes animos angusto in pectore versant, translating to 'Their little bodies lodge a mighty soul'.

In 1991, a Venus crater was named after Marie Lullin. It is located 23.1 N and 81.0 E, and it measures 24 kilometres (15 mi).

== Research ==
Lullin was considered "one of the earliest women to study insects experimentally." Lullin became her husband's "reader, secretary and observer." Together with their son Pierre and a servant, François Burnens, she helped Huber carry out his experiments that laid the foundations of scientific knowledge with regard to the life and biology of the honey bee. While her roles were never specified in their work, she was described as "a good pair of eyes for him," especially as blindness fully set in. She and Burnens would make the observations through Huber's questioning, and then he would come to his own conclusions. In volume one of Huber's book French: Nouvelles Observations sur les Abeilles (New Observations on Bees), Burnens received recognition for his assistance in the preface, whereas Lullin did not. When Burnens had left Huber, Marie had gained a larger role doing more of the investigations and all of the observations while working with their son. Pierre would go on to be an editor for volume two of Huber's book, where Marie was still uncredited.

Their discoveries on bees include the mating processes of the queen, the communicative function of the antenna, the production of wax, and the process of how drones left the hive.
