= Orontius (crater) =

Lunar impact crater

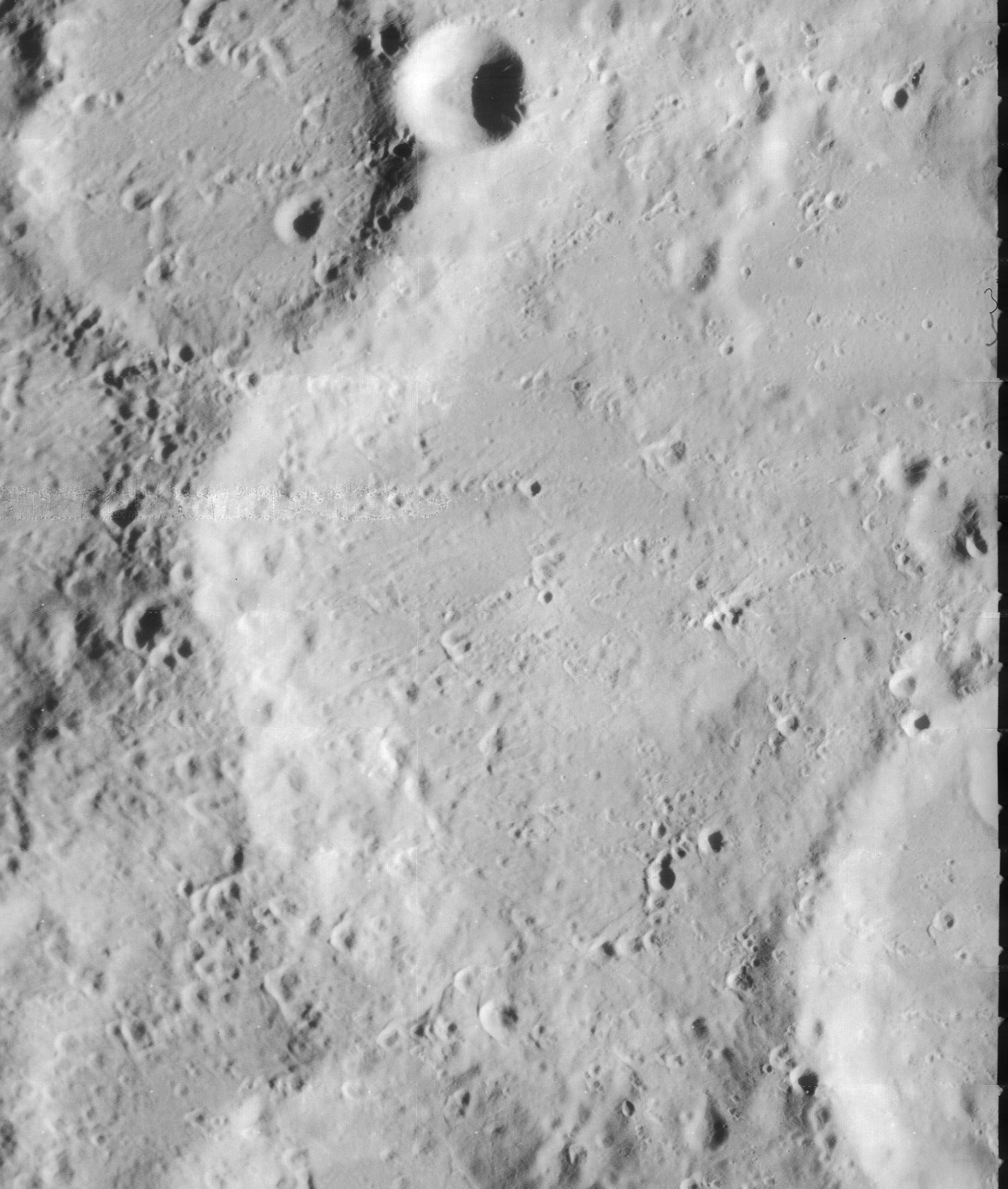
- Lunar Orbiter 4 image
- Coordinates: 40.3°S 4.0°W
- Diameter: 122 km
- Depth: 3.1 km
- Colongitude: 4° at sunrise
- Eponym: Oronce Fine

Orontius is a lunar impact crater that lies in the heavily cratered southern highlands of the Moon's near side. It was named after 16th century French mathematician Oronce Fine. It is located to the northwest of the prominent ray crater Tycho, and south and east of a large walled plain named Deslandres. The eastern part of the crater is overlain by the smaller crater Huggins, which is overlain in turn on its eastern rim by the still smaller Nasireddin, the trio forming a crater chain of diminishing dimensions. Joined to the southern rim is the crater Saussure. To the southwest, just east of Tycho, is Pictet.

The rim of Orontius is battered, worn, and overlain by a number of different craters. A pair of craters to the west have intruded into the crater wall, forming inward bulges. Little of the original wall remains nearly intact, with the south and southwestern rim having survived the erosion process better than the other wall sections.

The southwest half of the crater floor is still fairly flat and marred only by a few small craterlets. In the north of the crater, the distorted feature Orontius F forms a distorted, crater-like oval.

== Satellite craters ==
By convention these features are identified on lunar maps by placing the letter on the side of the crater midpoint that is closest to Orontius.

Orontius	Latitude	Longitude	Diameter
A	39.1° S	2.6° W	7 km
B	40.0° S	3.1° W	10 km
C	37.9° S	4.1° W	15 km
D	39.4° S	6.2° W	15 km
E	39.5° S	4.8° W	6 km
F	39.1° S	3.9° W	41 km
