= Huggins (lunar crater) =

Lunar impact crater

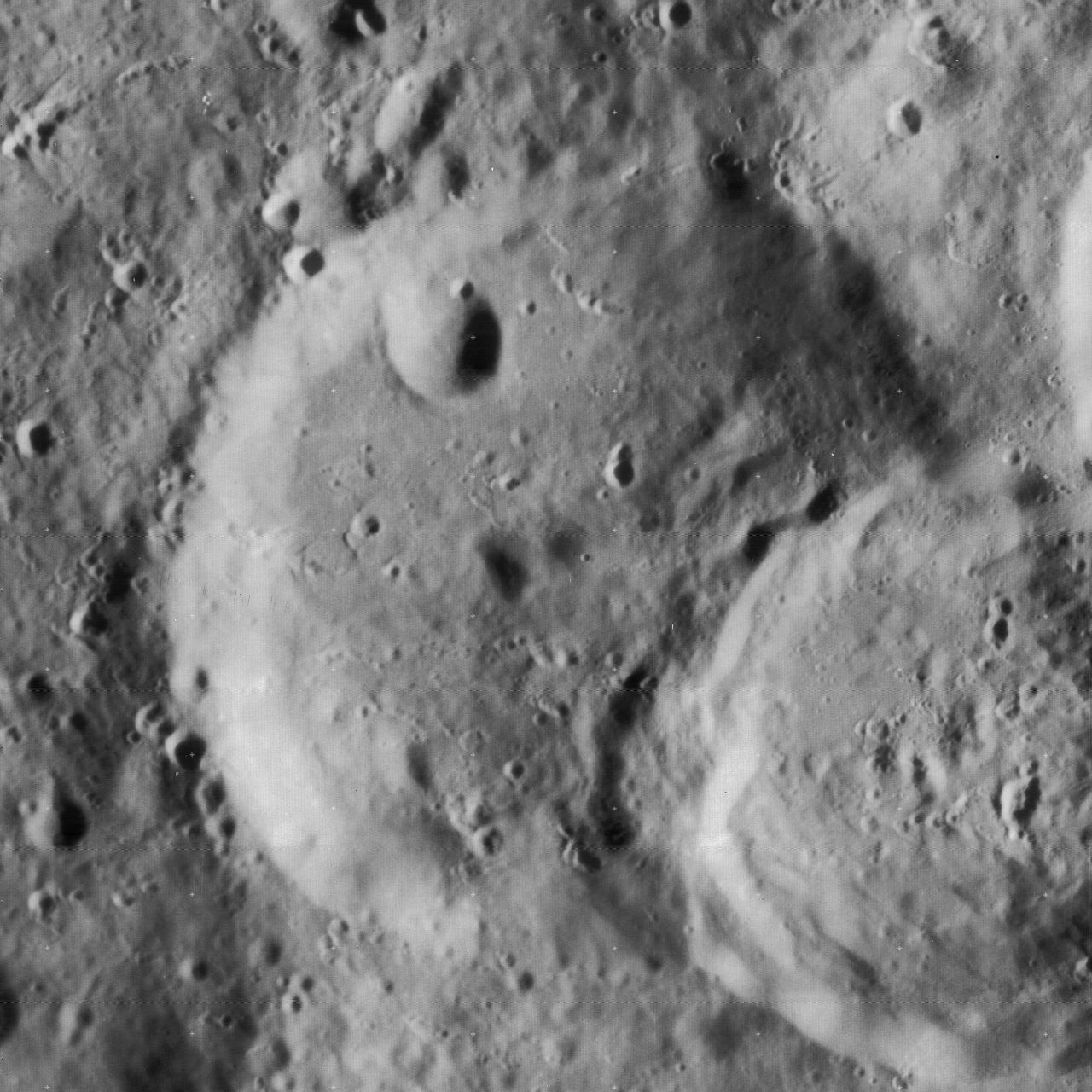
- Lunar Orbiter 4 image
- Coordinates: 41.1°S 1.4°W
- Diameter: 65 km
- Depth: 1.85 km
- Colongitude: 3° at sunrise
- Eponym: William Huggins

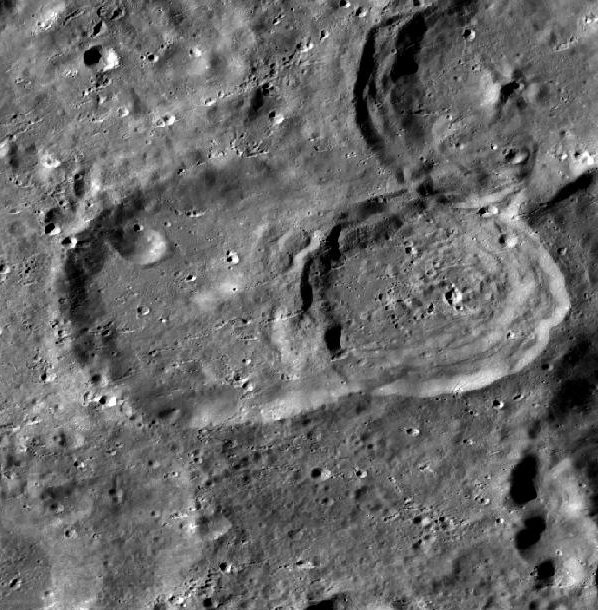
LRO image with Huggins at left, and Nasireddin at right

Huggins is a lunar impact crater that lies in the rugged southern highlands of the Moon's near side. It was named after British astronomer Sir William Huggins in 1935.

This crater lies across the eastern rim of the larger crater Orontius. The eastern rim of Huggins is laid across in turn by the slightly smaller crater Nasireddin. Thus these three craters form a triplet of decreasing age from west to east. To the northwest of Huggins is Miller, which is attached to the northern rim of Nasireddin.

This crater has been somewhat eroded, but the surviving rim remains relatively well-defined and is only overlaid by a few tiny craterlets. The western half of the interior floor is relatively level, although a small crater, Huggins A, is attached to the inner wall of the northwest rim. There is a central peak formation next to the outer rampart of the intruding Nasireddin.

== Satellite craters ==
By convention these features are identified on lunar maps by placing the letter on the side of the crater midpoint that is closest to Huggins. Huggins A lies within the Huggins crater.

| Huggins | Latitude | Longitude | Diameter |
|---|---|---|---|
| A | 40.6° S | 2.2° W | 11 km |
