= Christine Jurine =

Swiss scientific illustrator

- Born: 1776
- Died: 1812
- Scientific career
- Fields: scientific illustration

Christine Etiennette Pernette Jurine (1776–1812) was a Swiss scientific illustrator. She illustrated books written by her father, naturalist Louis Jurine, in particular Histoire des monocles qui se trouvent aux environs de Genève. She died at the age of 36 before this book was published, soon after the death of her invalid mother.

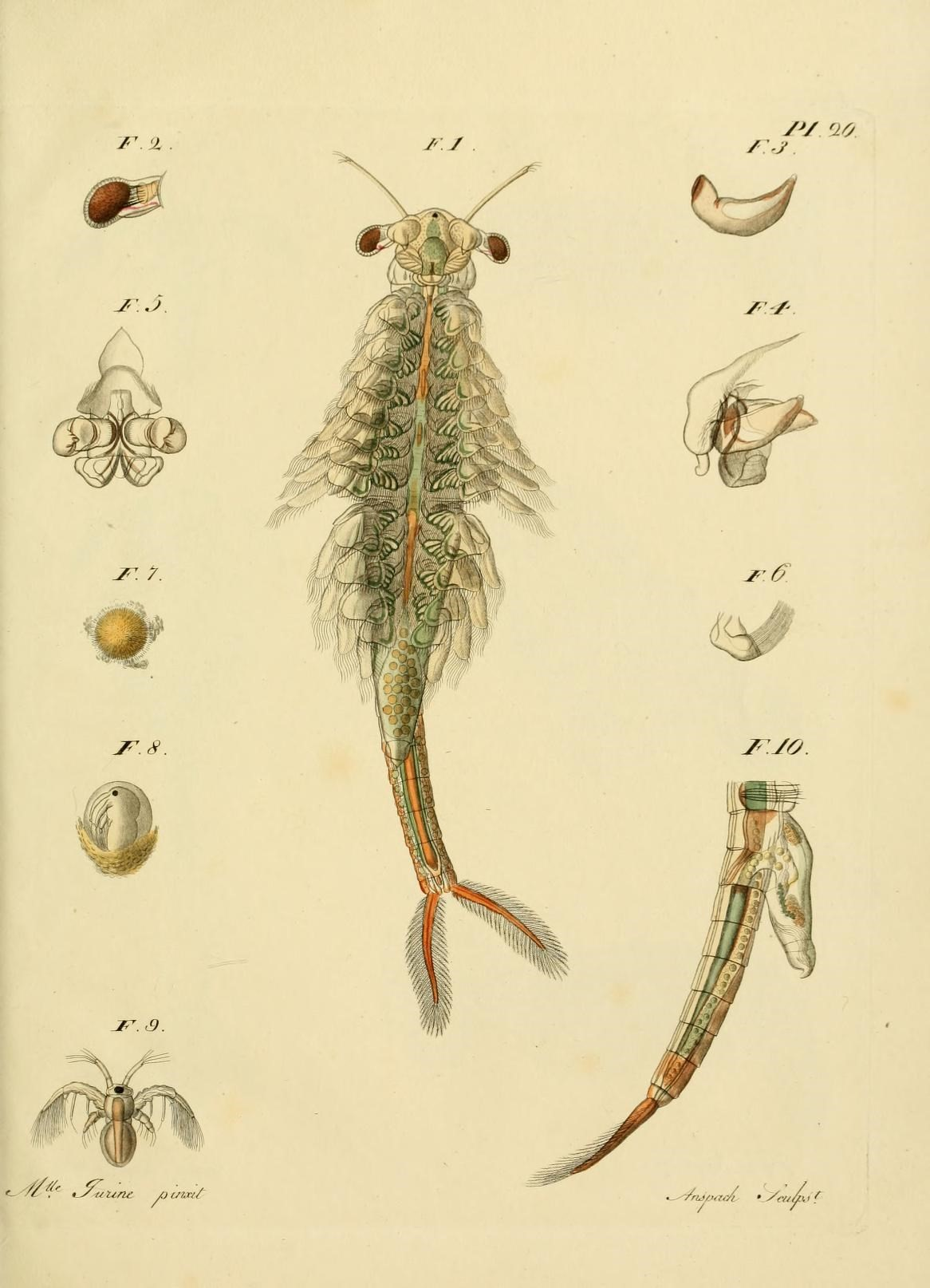
Illustrations by Christine Jurine in Histoire...

She also worked with François Huber in investigating the anatomy of bees.

She has been referred to as Jurine's "accomplished daughter", who "faithfully portrayed [the Entomostraca], as seen by the microscope." (William Baird, as quoted by Damkaer, 2002).

She has been highly praised for her illustration. For example, the editors of Histoire... (as quoted by Damkaer, 2002) said of her:

Since the famous Marie Sybille de Merian [1647-1717] crossed the seas in 1699, to observe and paint insects from Surinam, Mad.^{elle} Jurine is perhaps the person of her sex who has the most merit as a naturalist by her numerous drawings relative to Natural History. She unites the talents of an artist with the art, more difficult than you would imagine, of a good observer; also, her drawings are not recommended any less for their elegance as for their rigorous exactness.
