= Jean Senebier =

Genevan Calvinist pastor and naturalist (1742–1809)

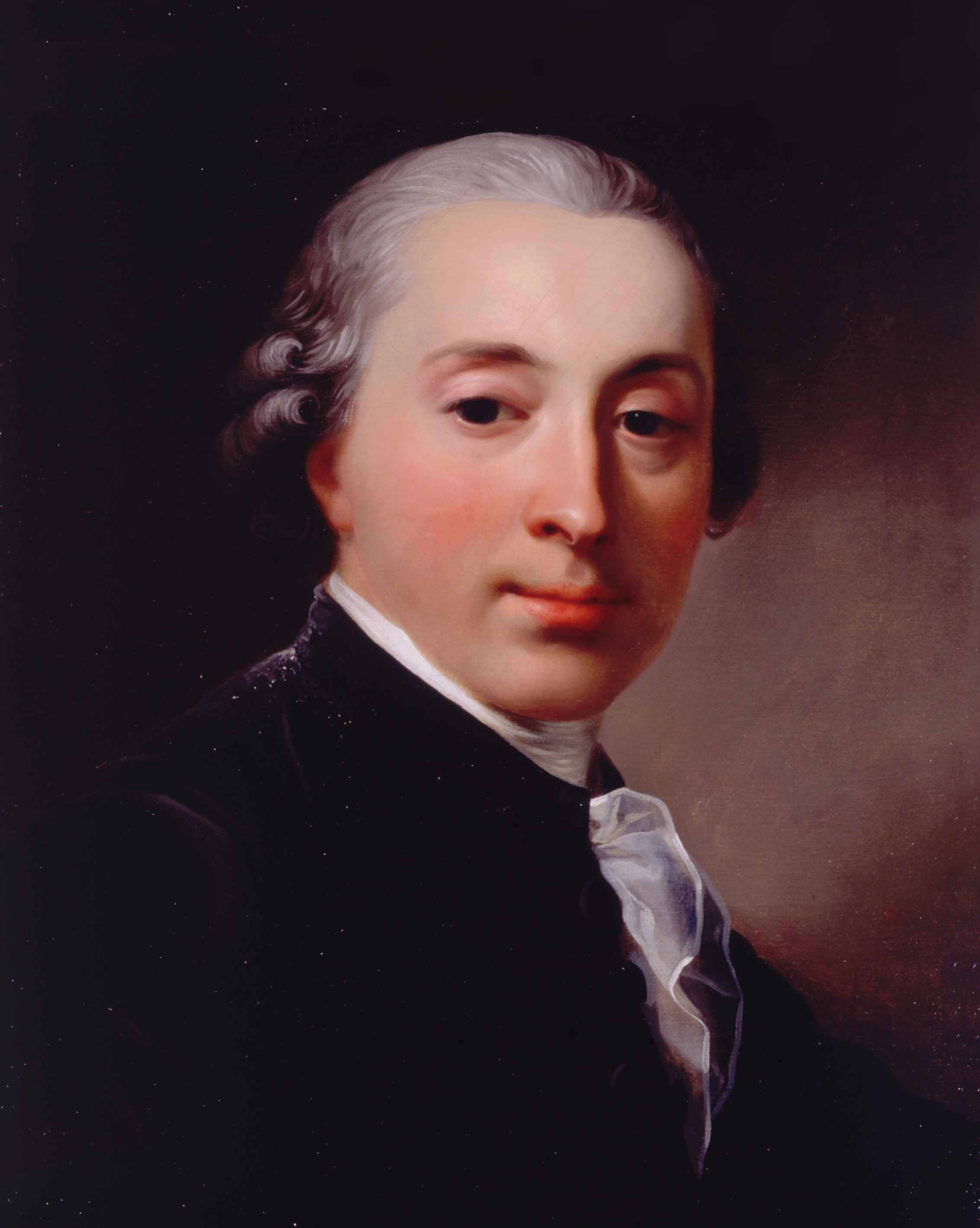
- Born: 25 May 1742; Geneva, Republic of Geneva
- Died: 22 July 1809 (aged 67); Geneva, Department of Léman, First French Empire
- Scientific career
- Fields: Plant physiology, photosynthesis

Jean Senebier (25 May 1742 – 22 July 1809) was a Genevan Calvinist pastor and naturalist. He was chief librarian of the Republic of Geneva. A pioneer in the field of photosynthesis research, he provided extensive evidence that plants consume carbon dioxide and produced oxygen. He also showed a link between the amount of carbon dioxide available and the amount of oxygen produced and determined that photosynthesis took place at the parenchyma, the green fleshy part of the leaf.

== Biography ==
Senebier was born in Geneva, the son of a wealthy merchant. He wrote extensively on plant physiology and was one of the major early pioneers of photosynthesis research. Senebier also published on the experimental method, first in 1775, and then in an expanded work, in 1802. His precise definition of the experimental method anticipated the work of noted French physiologist Claude Bernard fifty years later. Senebier also served as chief librarian of the Republic of Geneva.

Senebier was greatly influenced by Swiss naturalist Charles Bonnet. Senebier was also influenced by the Italian animal physiologist and experimental biologist Lazzaro Spallanzani, several of whose works Senebier translated from Italian into French. Spallanzani's chemical research on bodily functions of animals helped lead Senebier towards studying plant chemistry. Although Senebier's first research on plants was a large study on effects of light, he is remembered mainly for the extensive evidence he provided that carbon dioxide ("fixed air" or "carbonic acid," in the terminology of his day) is consumed by plants in the production of oxygen ("dephlogisticated air"), in the physiological process that later became known as photosynthesis. Senebier also found that the amount of oxygen produced is roughly proportional to the amount of carbon dioxide available to the plant. Further, he determined that the green fleshy parts of leaves (the parenchyma) are the sites where carbon dioxide is transformed into oxygen. Senebier also correctly concluded that plants use the carbon in carbon dioxide as a nutriment. Senebier did some of his research jointly with fellow Swiss naturalist François Huber.

Senebier arrived at his best known achievement, his demonstration that plants take up atmospheric carbon dioxide and give off oxygen, based entirely on the Phlogiston theory of chemistry, and only in his later works did he reformulate his conclusions in terms of the more modern, oxygen chemistry developed by Antoine Lavoisier and colleagues. This discovery by Senebier regarding gases ranks as one of the last of the important early discoveries in the unraveling of the fundamental chemical processes of photosynthesis. Marcello Malpighi and Nehemiah Grew, working independently in the late seventeenth century, and Stephen Hales in the early eighteenth century, had provided evidence that the atmosphere was important to plants, but further progress in understanding the role of gases in plant physiology awaited discoveries made between 1750 and 1780. In 1754, Charles Bonnet reported that leaves that were plunged in aerated water produced bubbles of gas, but he did not identify the gas. Then, in 1775, English chemist Joseph Priestley discovered oxygen (which he named "dephlogisticated air"), and, just a few years later, in 1779, Dutch physician and researcher Jan Ingenhousz demonstrated that the bubbles of gas observed by Bonnet on submerged leaves consisted of this same gas. Ingenhousz also published the first convincing evidence that leaves produce this gas only in sunlight.

Senebier was a close friend of noted Genevan geologist and meteorologist Horace-Bénédict de Saussure and was instrumental in the education of Horace-Bénédict's son Nicolas-Théodore de Saussure. Senebier trained the young man in Lavoisier's system of chemistry, which Nicolas-Théodore later applied in important plant-nutrition studies of his own. The younger Saussure would eventually discover the role of water in photosynthesis, thus completing the early chemical research on this subject.

In April 1809, Senebier became a Correspondent of the Royal Netherlands Academy of Arts and Sciences.

The standard botanical author abbreviation Seneb. is applied to species Senebier described.

== Works ==
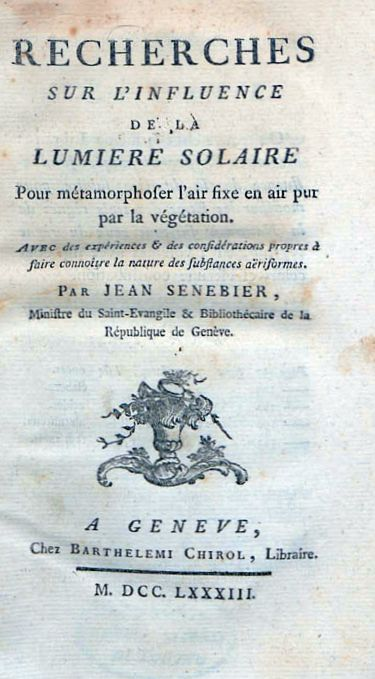
Recherches sur l'influence de la lumiere solaire pour métamorpher l'air fixe en air pur par la végétation, 1783

- Recherches sur l'influence de la lumiere solaire pour métamorpher l'air fixe en air pur par la végétation (in French). Genève: Chirol Barthelemi. 1783.
- Histoire littéraire de Genève, Genève 1786, vol. 1 ; 2 ; 3.
- Expériences sur l'action de la lumière solaire dans la végétation (in French). Genève: Manget Barde & C. 1788.
- Météorologie pratique a l'usage de tous les hommes, et sourtout des Cultivateurs (in French). Paris: Jean Jacques Paschoud. 1810.
