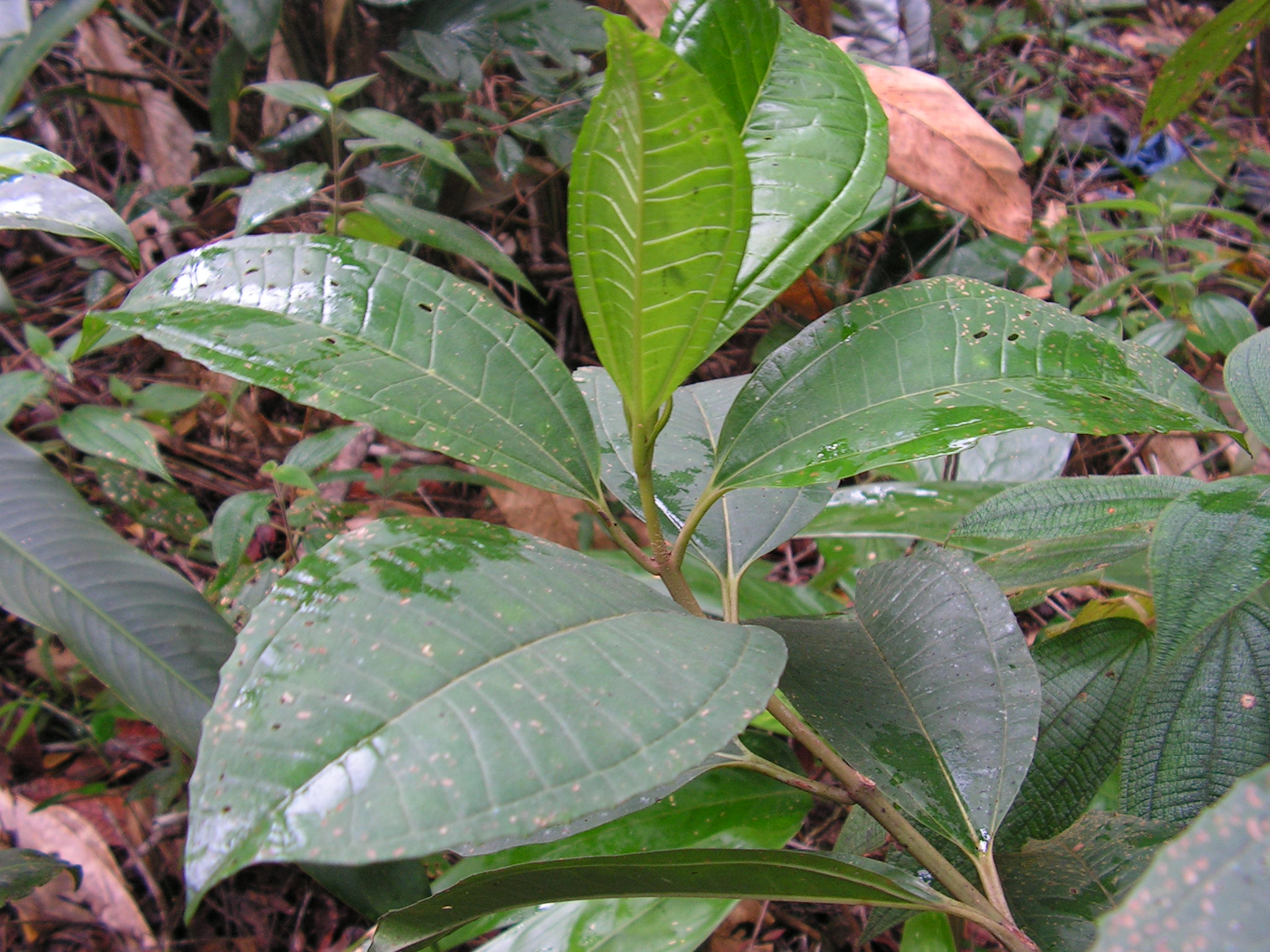
- Huberia consimilis Baumgratz from Lagoa dos Gatos, Pernambuco, Brazil

Scientific classification
- Kingdom: Plantae
- Clade: Embryophytes
- Clade: Tracheophytes
- Clade: Spermatophytes
- Clade: Angiosperms
- Clade: Eudicots
- Clade: Rosids
- Order: Myrtales
- Family: Melastomataceae
- Genus: Huberia; DC.

Synonyms
- Behuria Cham.; Benevidesia Saldanha & Cogn.; Dolichoura Brade

= Huberia (plant) =

Species of flowering plant

Huberia is a genus of flowering plants belonging to the family Melastomataceae.

Its native range is from Ecuador to Peru, eastern and southern Brazil.

== General description ==
Most are shrubs, the leaves are opposite (arranged), petiolate (has a leaf stalk) and are serrated. It flowers with 3 flowered cymes which have a long stipitate (stalk). The flowers are similar in form to Meriania species, but tetramerous (in four parts). The receptacle (the axis of a flower) is urceolate (shaped like an urn or pitcher) or lageniform (flask-shaped) and narrowed to the neck, sometimes costate alate (ribbed like a wing). The flower has 4 sepals which are broad, and 4 petals which are longer than the calyx and much contorted. It has 8 stamens, which have a dorsal appendage which is less developed. The anthers are incurved and elongated. It has a seed capsule that is 4-valved. The seeds are sometimes imbricate (tiled and overlapping), produced on both sides to an elongated wing. The seeds are also winged and pyramidal (in form).

== Taxonomy ==
The genus name of Huberia is in honour of François Huber (1750–1831) a Swiss entomologist who specialized in honey bees, and also his son Jean Pierre Huber. Augustin Pyramus de Candolle was a close friend of Huber and wrote a biography of him in 1832. The genus was first described and published in Prodr. Vol.3 on page 167 in 1828.

== Known species ==
According to Kew:

- Huberia bradeana Bochorny & R.Goldenb.
- Huberia capixaba (R.Goldenb. & Reginato) Bochorny & Michelang.
- Huberia carvalhoi Baumgratz
- Huberia cogniauxii Baumgratz
- Huberia comosa (R.Tav., Baumgratz & R.Goldenb.) Bochorny & Michelang.
- Huberia consimilis Baumgratz
- Huberia cordifolia (Cogn.) Bochorny & R.Goldenb.
- Huberia corymbosa (Cogn.) Bochorny & R.Goldenb.
- Huberia edmundoi (Brade) Bochorny & R.Goldenb.
- Huberia espiritosantensis Baumgratz
- Huberia glazioviana Cogn.
- Huberia glutinosa (Cogn.) Bochorny & R.Goldenb.
- Huberia hirsuta Bochorny & R.Goldenb.
- Huberia huberioides (Brade) Bochorny & R.Goldenb.
- Huberia insignis (Cham.) Bochorny & R.Goldenb.
- Huberia kollmannii (R.Goldenb. & R.Tav.) Bochorny & Michelang.
- Huberia laurina DC.
- Huberia limae (Brade) Bochorny & R.Goldenb.
- Huberia lumiarensis (Bochorny, Michelang. & R.Goldenb.) Bochorny
- Huberia magdalenensis (Brade) Bochorny & R.Goldenb.
- Huberia mestrealvarensis (D.T.Iglesias & R.Goldenb.) Bochorny & Michelang.
- Huberia minor Cogn.
- Huberia minutifolia Bochorny & R.Goldenb.
- Huberia misteriosa Bochorny & R.Goldenb.
- Huberia mourae (Cogn.) Bochorny & R.Goldenb.
- Huberia nettoana Brade
- Huberia organensis (Saldanha & Cogn.) Bochorny & R.Goldenb.
- Huberia ovalifolia DC.
- Huberia parvifolia Cogn.
- Huberia peruviana Cogn.
- Huberia piranii Baumgratz
- Huberia semiserrata DC.
- Huberia sessilifolia R.Goldenb. & Michelang.
- Huberia souza-limae (Brade) Bochorny & R.Goldenb.
- Huberia staminodia Baumgratz
- Huberia triplinervis Cogn.
- Huberia weberbaueriana Baumgratz

The type species, Huberia semiserrata DC. is listed by the United States Department of Agriculture and the Agricultural Research Service on 21 March 2005.

== Other sources ==
- Applequist, W. L. 2014. Report of the Nomenclature Committee for Vascular Plants: 66. Taxon 63:1370. Note: should be treated as earlier homonym of Hubera Chaowasku
- Baumgratz, J. F. A. 2004. Sinopse de Huberia DC. (Melastomataceae:Merianieae). Revista Brasil. Bot. 27(3):545–561.
- Chaowasku, T. 2013. (7) Request for a binding decision on whether Huberia DC. (Melastomataceae) and Hubera Chaowasku (Annonaceae) are sufficiently alike to be confused. Taxon 62:412.
