= Pernette (surname) =

Pernette is a French surname. Notable people with the surname include:

- Amaury Pernette (born 1986), French curler
- Joseph Pernette (1728–1807), German-born Canadian merchant and politician

== See also ==
- Pernette (given name)
