= Maurolycus (crater) =

Crater on the Moon

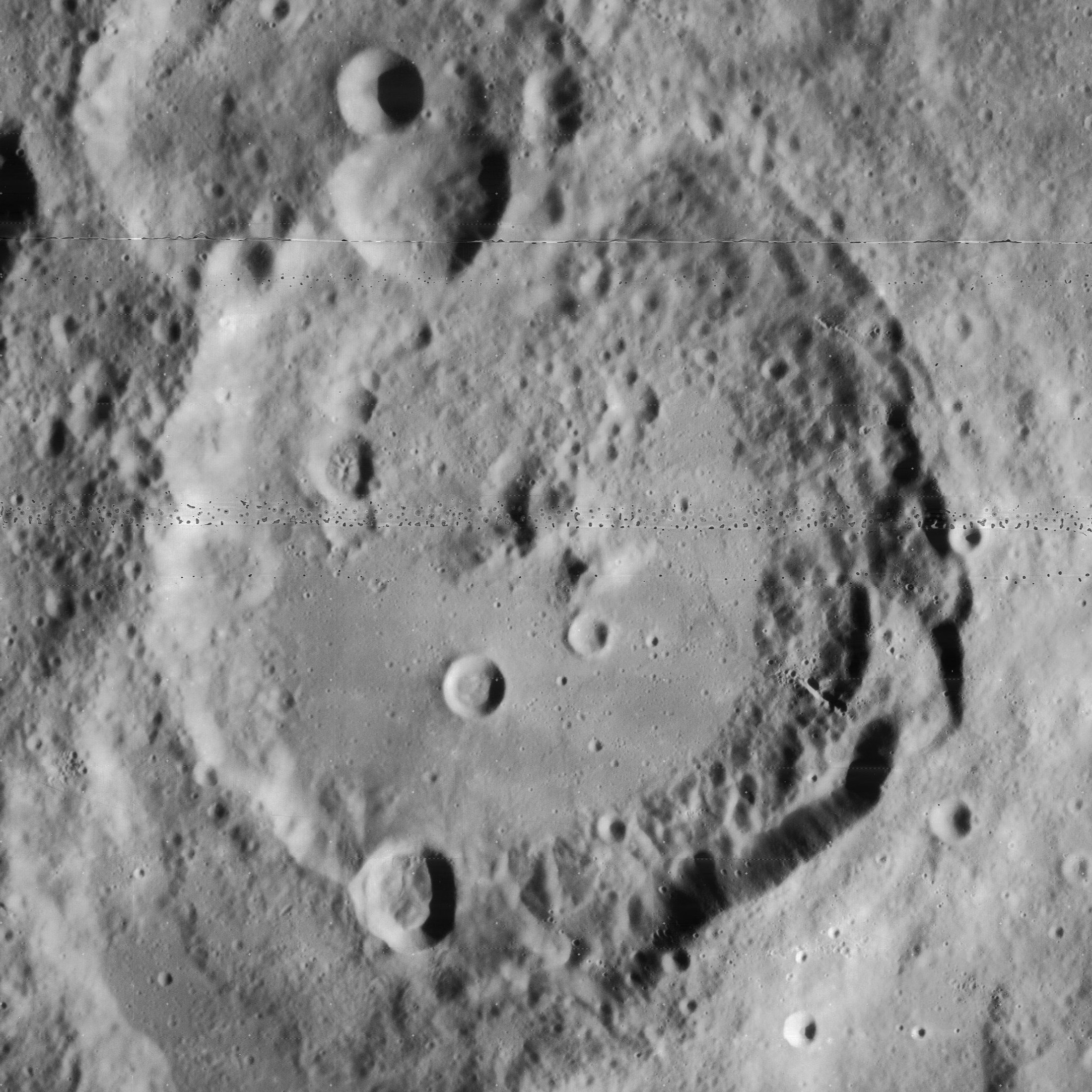
- Lunar Orbiter 4 image
- Coordinates: 41.8°S 14.0°E
- Diameter: 114 km
- Depth: 4.7 km
- Colongitude: 345° at sunrise
- Eponym: Francesco Maurolico

Maurolycus is one of the more prominent lunar impact craters in the southern highland region of the Moon that is covered in overlapping crater impacts. British astronomer T. W. Webb called it "a noble walled plain, sure to be found in grand relief about [1st] Quarter, or 2^{d} before [3rd] Quarter." It is joined at the southeast rim by the smaller crater Barocius. Due west lie the overlapping pair of Stöfler and Faraday. To the northeast is the faint crater Buch, and further to the north lies Gemma Frisius.

The outer walls of Maurolycus are tall, wide, and terraced, most notably in the eastern part. To the southeast the rim is lower and the crater is joined to what has the appearance of an overlain crater rim. The crater Maurolycus F lies across the northwest rim, and that part of the crater floor is more rugged than the remainder. The other sections of the floor are relatively level, with a complex of central peaks and a pair of craterlets. The infrared spectrum of pure crystalline plagioclase has been identified on the floor and northern rim. The small crater Maurolycus A is biting into the southern part of the rim.

This crater was named after 16th century Italian mathematician Francesco Maurolico (1494-1575). Its designation was formally adopted by the International Astronomical Union in 1935.

== Satellite craters ==
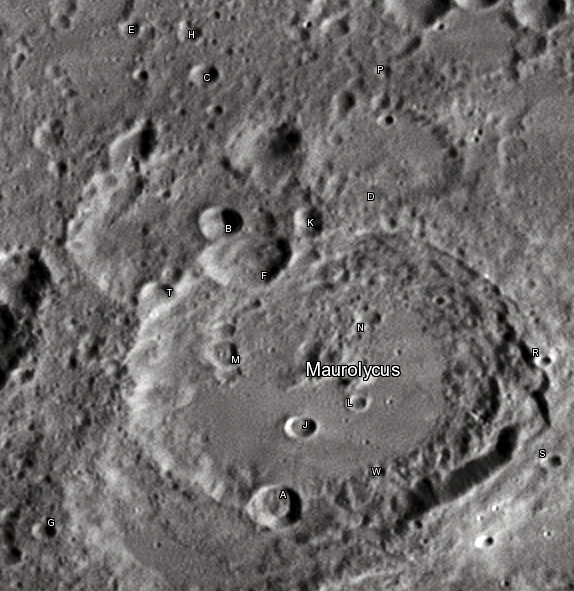
Maurolycus crater and its satellite craters taken from Earth in 2012 at the University of Hertfordshire's Bayfordbury Observatory with the telescopes Meade LX200 14" and Lumenera Skynyx 2-1

By convention these features are identified on lunar maps by placing the letter on the side of the crater midpoint that is closest to Maurolycus.

Maurolycus	Latitude	Longitude	Diameter
A	43.5° S	14.2° E	15 km
B	40.3° S	11.7° E	12 km
C	38.6° S	10.8° E	9 km
D	39.0° S	13.2° E	45 km
E	38.4° S	9.8° E	6 km
F	40.6° S	12.2° E	25 km
G	44.4° S	11.5° E	7 km
H	38.2° S	10.4° E	7 km
J	42.5° S	14.0° E	9 km
K	40.0° S	12.6° E	8 km
L	42.1° S	14.5° E	6 km
M	41.9° S	12.6° E	10 km
N	41.0° S	14.1° E	7 km
P	38.1° S	12.8° E	4 km
R	40.7° S	16.2° E	5 km
S	42.0° S	17.1° E	7 km
T	41.3° S	11.4° E	10 km
W	42.7° S	15.2° E	4 km
