= Nasireddin (crater) =

Crater on the Moon

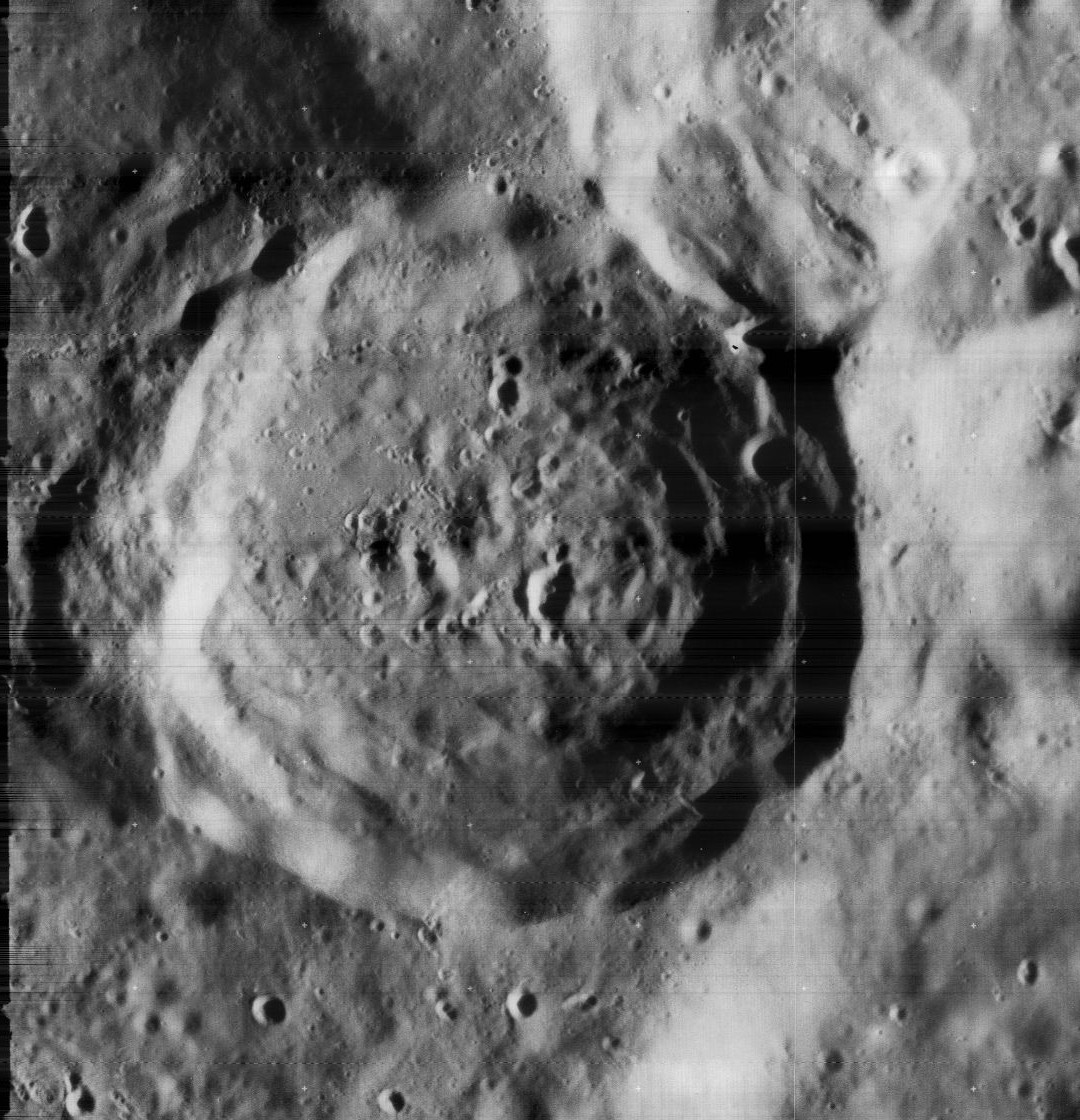
- Lunar Orbiter 4 image
- Coordinates: 41.0°S 0.2°E
- Diameter: 52 km
- Depth: 3.0 km
- Colongitude: 1° at sunrise
- Eponym: Nasir al-Din al-Tusi

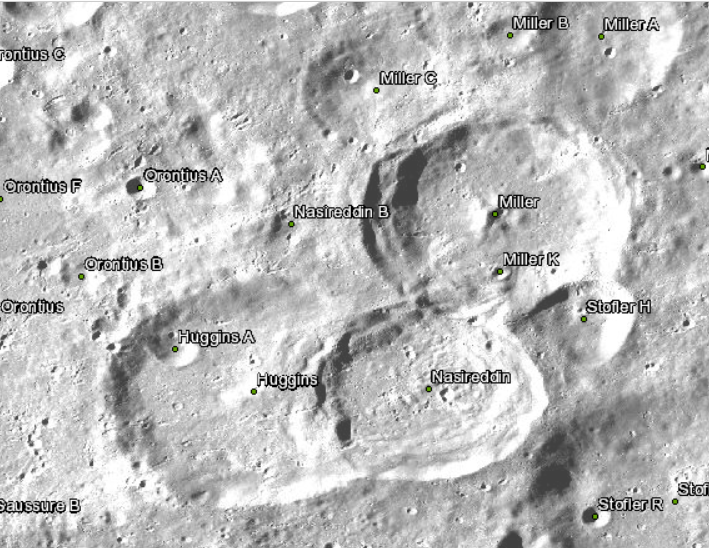
LRO image of Nasireddin (lower center), overlapping Huggins crater (lower left,) and bordering Miller crater (upper right).

Nasireddin is a lunar impact crater that lies in the rugged terrain in the southern part of the Moon's near side. This crater overlaps two older formations, intruding into the crater Miller to the north and Huggins to the west. To the east of Nasireddin is the much larger walled plain named Stöfler.

This crater is a younger formation than the two craters it overlies, particularly the worn Huggins to the west. This fine crater retains much detail, including a terraced inner wall and a sharp rim to the south and east where the inner wall has slumped. The interior floor is relatively level, but rough-surfaced. There are a few low central peaks near the midpoint of the interior, and a few tiny craterlets to mark the surface.

'Nasireddin' has been named after Nasīr al-Dīn Tūsī, a medieval Persian polymath and prominent writer; who is considered to be the greatest of the later Persian scholars. Nasīr al-Dīn Tūsī was an architect, astronomer, biologist, chemist, mathematician, philosopher, physician, physicist, scientist, theologian, and Marja Taqleed (Islamic scholar).

== Satellite craters ==
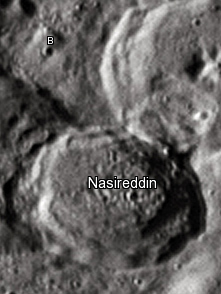
Nasireddin crater and its satellite craters taken from Earth in 2012 at the University of Hertfordshire's Bayfordbury Observatory with the telescopes Meade LX200 14" and Lumenera Skynyx 2-1

By convention these features are identified on lunar maps by placing the letter on the side of the crater midpoint that is closest to Nasireddin.

Nasireddin	Latitude	Longitude	Diameter
B	39.4° S	1.1° W	9 km
