= Lexell (disambiguation) =

Anders Johan Lexell was a Russian astronomer and mathematician.

Lexell may also refer to:

- Jan Lexell, a Swedish physician and academic.
- 2004 Lexell, a main belt asteroid
- D/1770 L1 (Lexell), lost short-periodic comet
- Lexell (crater), a 2.2 km-deep lunar crater
