= Ball (crater) =

Lunar crater

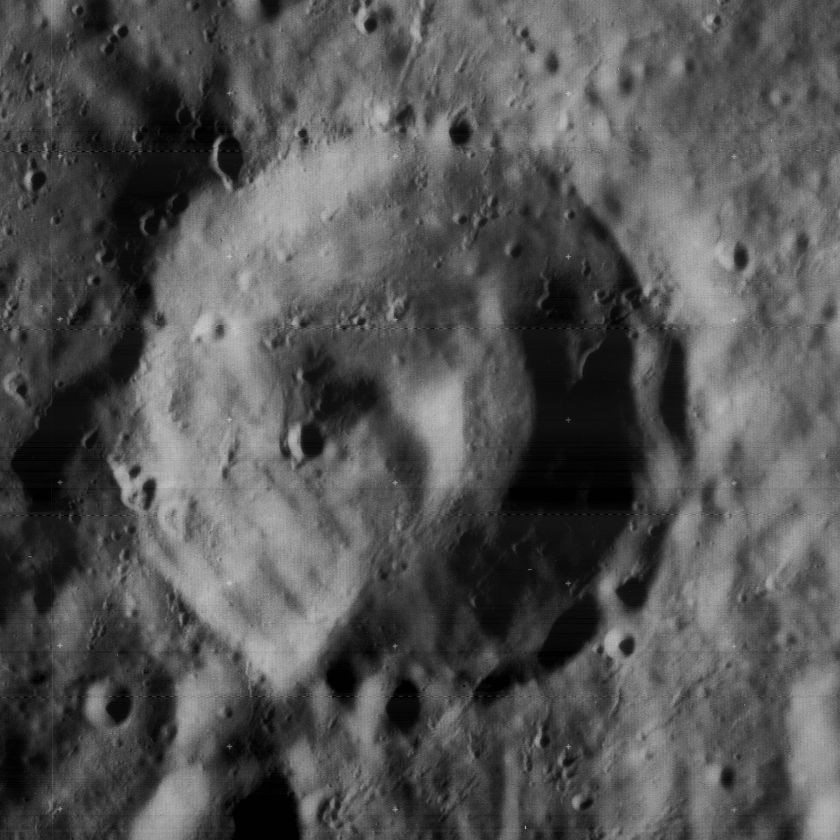
- Lunar Orbiter 4 image
- Coordinates: 35.9°S 8.4°W
- Diameter: 40.31 km (25.05 mi)
- Depth: 2.8 km
- Colongitude: 9° at sunrise
- Eponym: William Ball

Ball is a lunar impact crater that is located in the rugged southern highlands of the Moon. The formation is circular and symmetrical, and has received little significant wear. Patrick Moore describes it as having "high terraced walls". The interior is rough-surfaced, curving downward toward the relatively wide central peak at the midpoint. There is a significant groove in the southern wall that runs southward to a smaller external crater.

The crater is situated on the rim of the more sizable Deslandres, to the east of the crater Lexell, and southwest of Gauricus. To the north is Sasserides, and further to the north-northwest is the prominent ray crater Tycho.

This crater was named after British astronomer William Ball (c.1631–1690). The name was introduced into lunar nomenclature by William R. Birt and John Lee. Its designation was formally adopted by the International Astronomical Union in 1935.

== Satellite craters ==
By convention these features are identified on lunar maps by placing the letter on the side of the crater midpoint that is closest to Ball.

Ball	Latitude	Longitude	Diameter
A	34.7° S	9.3° W	29 km
B	36.9° S	9.1° W	10 km
C	37.7° S	8.7° W	31 km
D	35.6° S	10.3° W	21 km
E	36.5° S	8.1° W	5 km
F	36.9° S	8.5° W	12 km
G	37.7° S	10.1° W	28 km
