= Hell (crater) =

Crater on the Moon

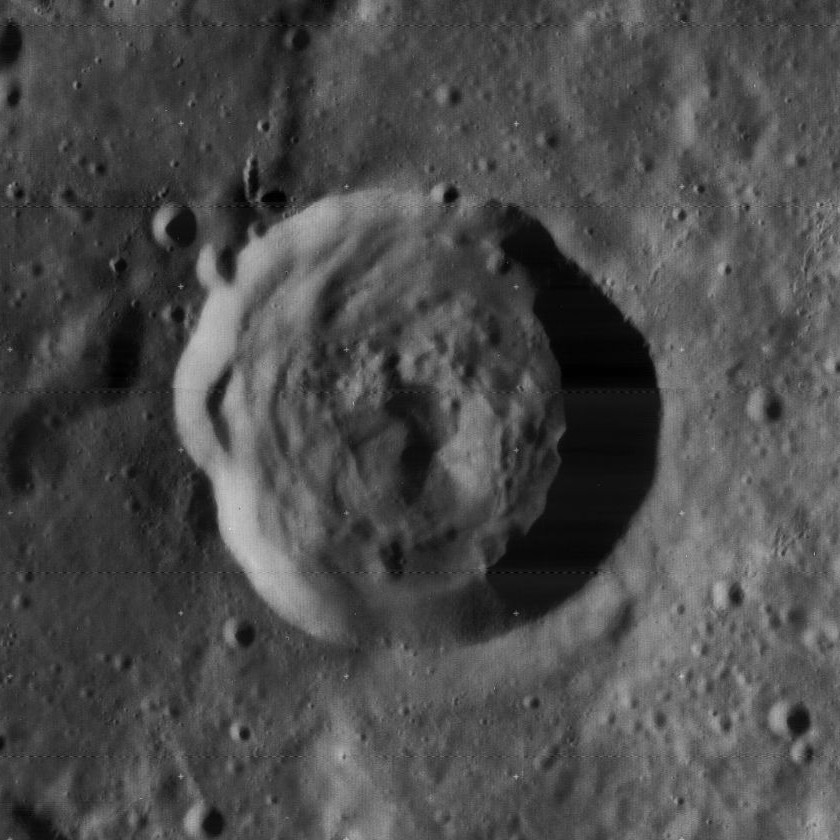
- Lunar Orbiter 4 image
- Coordinates: 32.43°S 7.85°W
- Diameter: 32.55 km
- Depth: 2.2 km
- Colongitude: 8° at sunrise
- Eponym: Maximilian Hell

Hell is a lunar crater in the south of the Moon's near side, within the western half of the enormous walled plain named Deslandres. To the southeast, also within Deslandres, is the larger crater Lexell, and about 9° to the south lies the prominent Tycho crater. The crater received its name in 1935 after the Hungarian astronomer and ordained Jesuit priest Maximilian Hell. It has 19 satellite craters with diameters ranging between about 3 and 22 km. Nearly all Hell craters are relatively flat and shallow, with a sharp, well-defined rim and a typical diameter-to-depth ratio of about 10.

== Description ==
Hell is somewhat circular but with an outward bulge along the western rim. The interior floor is rolling and uneven, with several hills and a central peak about 1 km tall. The sharp-edged rim is not significantly eroded, and has a narrow inner wall; it is 2–3 times higher on the north-west than on the east where it rises by about 820 meters.

== Satellite craters ==
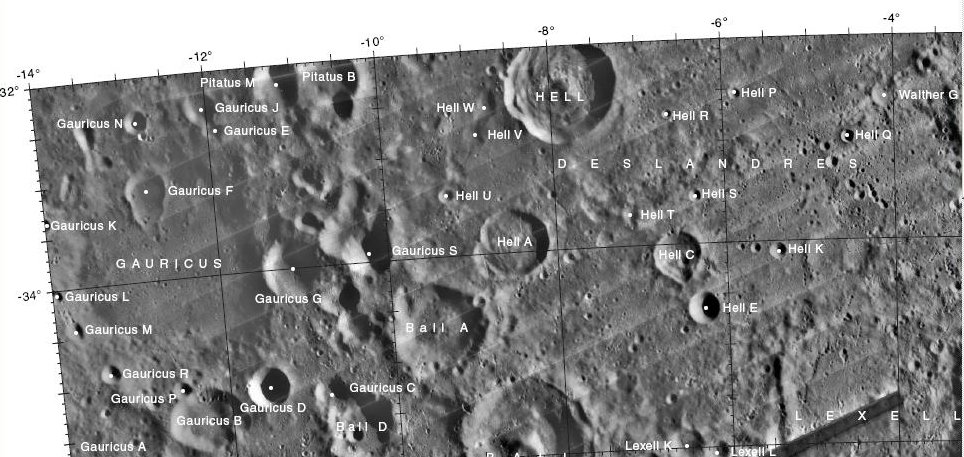

Hell	Latitude	Longitude	Diameter, km	Depth, km
A	33.91° S	8.51° W	20.3	
B	30.04° S	5.87° W	21.55	0.63
C	34.11° S	6.59° W	13.96	
E	34.64° S	6.59° W	9.32	
H	31.75° S	3.9° W	4.87	0.41
J	29.7° S	6.96° W	5.19	
K	34.11° S	5.4° W	4.82	
L	30.68° S	4.79° W	5.33	0.38
M	30.36° S	4.82° W	8.15	0.5
N	30.07° S	5.07° W	3.45	
P	32.56° S	5.85° W	3.42	
Q	33.0° S	4.55° W	3.75	
R	32.73° S	6.66° W	3.02	
S	33.54° S	6.36° W	3.73	
T	33.71° S	7.13° W	5.12	
U	33.42° S	9.28° W	4.21	0.54
V	32.82° S	8.88° W	7.16	
W	32.54° S	8.73° W	7.87	
X	31.98° S	9.27° W	4.23	

Nineteen satellite craters were found near Hell. Whereas many of them were described in the 19th century, their naming was officially recognized by the IAU only in 2006. They are labeled by capital Latin letters following the nomenclature established by Johann Heinrich von Mädler in the 1820s.

However, their order is not systematic, either by diameter, by distance from the central crater or by the azimuthal angle, as agreed for some other lunar craters. Their shape is similar to that of the main crater, with nearly flat bottom, nearly round shape and a distinct thin rim. Hell A, B and C – the largest satellites – have one irregularity in the rim for each crater, facing south-west, north-west and south, respectively. Whereas most Hell satellites are separated from one another, Hell L and M merge forming an elongated shape. The rim is rather diffuse in Hell T, V and W and could have been smoothened by the ejecta of the main Hell crater.

Letters I and O are omitted in the modern nomenclature, in order to keep the number of available symbols 24, that is equal to the number of azimuthal sectors (clock system). However, the reason for lacking Hell D, F, G is uncertain. Hell Q has two sub-satellites, 7 and 8 o'clock from it. These three craters, all of similar size, were sometimes referred to as Q, QA and QB, but only one was recognized by the IAU in 2006, and named Hell Q. It is a relatively recent crater with the age estimated as younger than that of Tycho, that is younger than about 108 million years.

== History and etymology ==
The crater was named after the Hungarian astronomer and an ordained Jesuit priest Maximilian Hell (1720–1792). The name was first given by Johann Hieronymus Schröter to the entire plane, Hell plane, which is now known as Deslandres, but Mädler reassigned it to the crater. It was officially recognized by Mary Adela Blagg and Karl Müller in the first official version of the International Astronomical Union (IAU) nomenclature for lunar features in 1935. Hell B was previously known as Schupmann and Hell Q as Cassini's Bright Spot.
