= Maximilian Hell =

Hungarian astronomer and Jesuit priest (1720–1792)

Maximilian Hell Hell Miksa
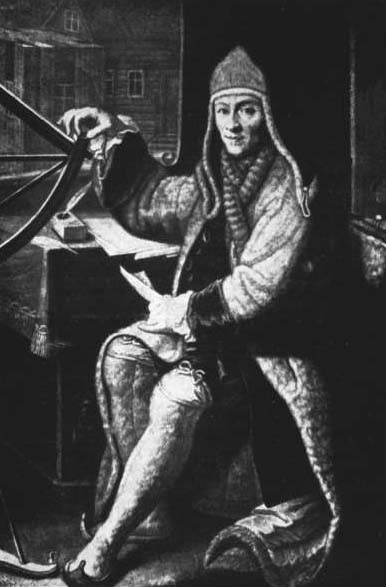
- Maximilian Hell dressed in Sami clothing during his stay at Vardø in 1769 to observe the Venus transit
- Born: Rudolf Maximilian Höll; May 15, 1720; Selmecbánya, Kingdom of Hungary (present-day Banská Štiavnica, Slovakia)
- Died: April 14, 1792 (aged 71); Vienna, Austria
- Scientific career
- Fields: Astronomy

Maximilian Hell (Hungarian: Hell Miksa) (born Rudolf Maximilian Höll; May 15, 1720 – April 14, 1792) was an astronomer and ordained Jesuit priest from the Kingdom of Hungary. The lunar crater Hell is named after him.

== Early life ==
He was born as Rudolf Maximilian Höll in Selmecbánya, Hont County, Kingdom of Hungary (present-day Slovakia), but later changed his surname to Hell. He was the third son from the second marriage of his father Matthias Cornelius Hell (Matthäus Kornelius Hell) and his mother Julianna Staindl. The couple had a total of 22 children. Registry entries indicate that the family was of German descent, while Maximilian Hell later in life (c. 1750) is known to have declared himself as Hungarian. His mother tongue was German. Even so, Hell considered himself a Hungarian.

The place of birth of Maximilian's father is unknown; the settlements Körmöcbánya (today Kremnica), Schlagenwald, (today Horní Slavkov) or Schlackenwerth (today Ostrov nad Ohří) are most frequently given. Born in a mixed German, Hungarian and Slovak town, he presumably knew Slovak to a certain extent and he probably understood Hungarian.

== Career ==
Hell, with another Jesuit priest, János Sajnovics, tried to explore the already widely discussed but insufficiently documented affinity between the language of the Sami, Finns and the Hungarians during and after their residency in Vardø. (Demonstratio idioma Ungarorum et Lapponum idem esse, 1770 Copenhagen)

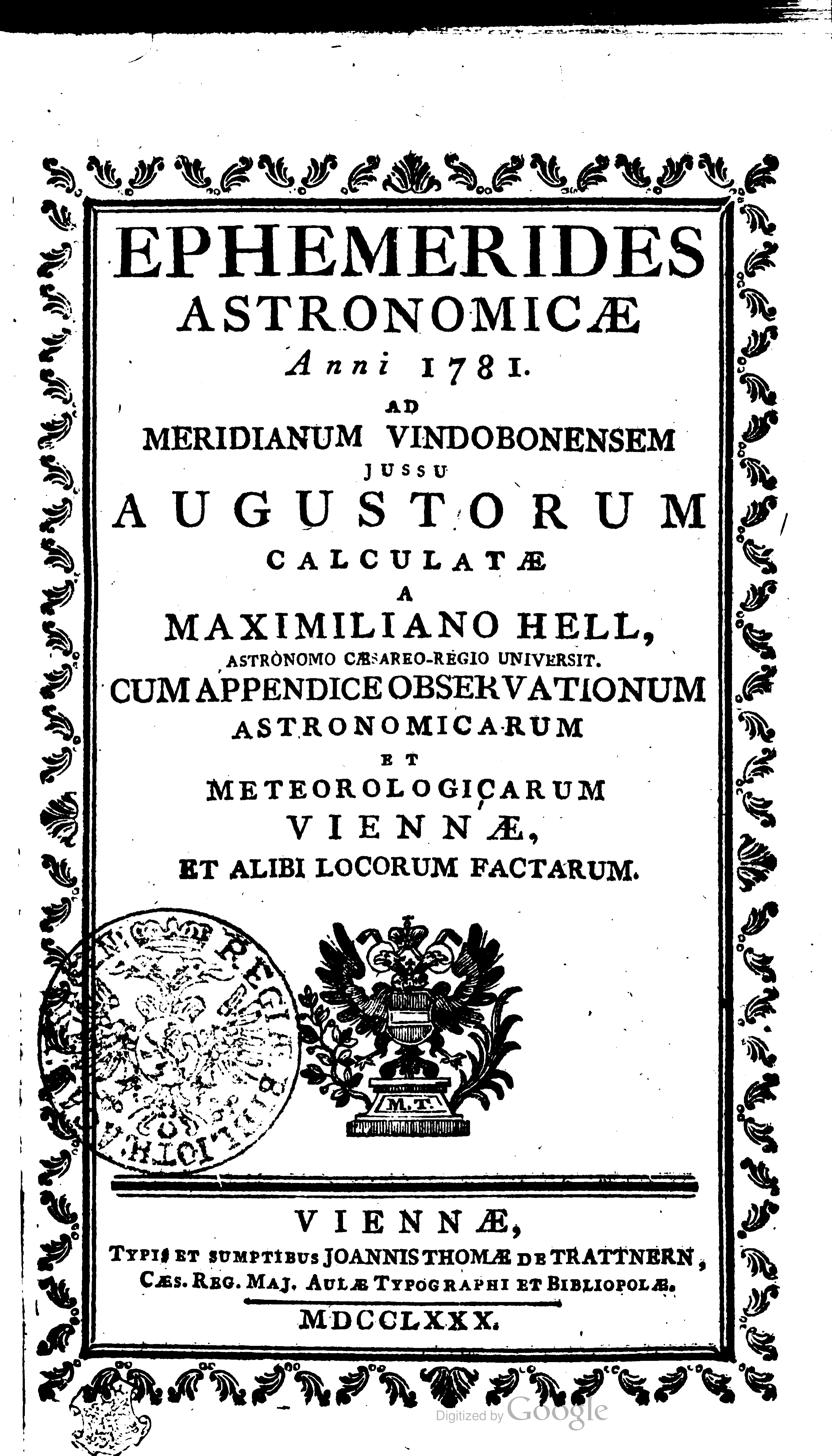
Title page of the Ephemerides Vindobonensem for 1781.

Hell became the director of the Vienna Observatory in 1756. He published the astronomical tables Ephemerides astronomicae ad meridianum Vindobonemsem ("Ephemerides for the Meridian of Vienna").

Hell and his assistant János Sajnovics went to Vardø in the far north of Norway (then part of Denmark-Norway) to observe the 1769 transit of Venus. Hell was one of the first group of astronomers to observe the complete transit; he took the most northernly viewpoint (in Lapland), while others, including Captain Cook and Joseph Banks, Guillaume Le Gentil and Jean-Baptiste Chappe d'Auteroche took readings around the world.

He was elected as a foreign member of the Royal Danish Academy of Sciences and Letters on October 13, 1769. This society also funded the publication of his 1770 account of the Venus passage Observatio transitus Veneris ante discum Solis die 3. Junii anno 1769 (Copenhagen, 1770).

Besides astronomy, Hell also had an interest in magnet therapy (the alleged healing power of magnets), although it was Franz Anton Mesmer who went further with this and received most of the credit.

== Honors and awards ==
In 1771, Hell was elected a foreign member of the Royal Swedish Academy of Sciences. However, it is believed that he did not accept the offer, as his name is not on the official Fellows list.

== Legacy ==
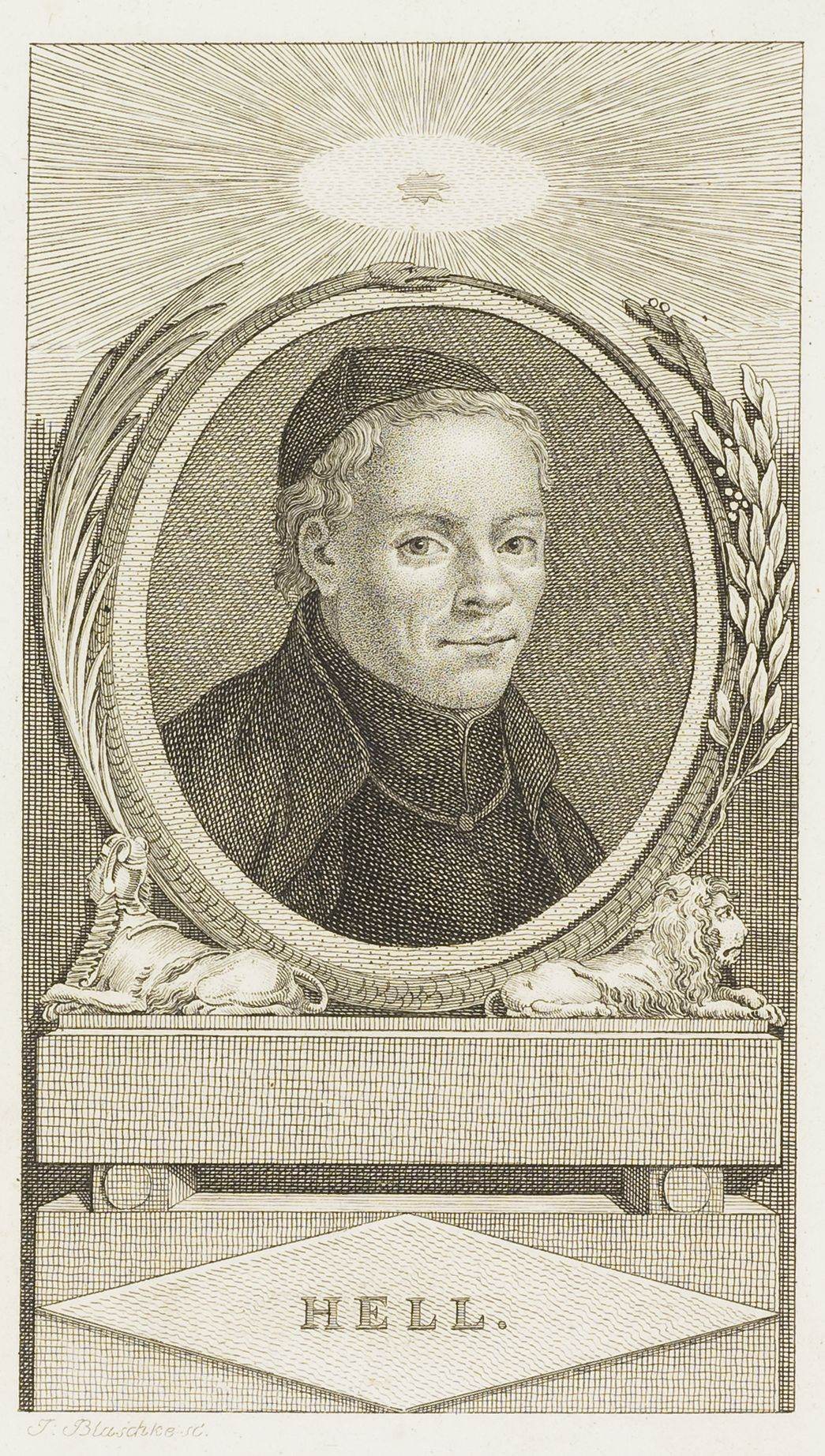
Maximilian Hell

There was some controversy about Hell's observations of the transit of Venus because he stayed in Norway for eight months, collecting non-astronomical scientific data about the arctic regions for a planned encyclopedia (which never appeared, in part due to the suppression of the Jesuit order). The publication of his results was delayed, and some (notably Joseph Johann Littrow) accused Hell posthumously of falsifying his results. However, Simon Newcomb carefully studied Hell's notebooks and exonerated him a century after his death in Vienna.

The crater Hell on the Moon is named after him.

== Works ==
- Elementa Algebrae Joannis Crivelli magis illustrata et novis demonstrationibus et problematibus aucta. Vindobonae, 1745. (Book of Joannis Crivelli, updated by Maximilian Hell)
- Adiumentum Memoriae manuale chronologico-genealogico-historicum. München, 1750 és Ingolstadt, 1763.
- Compendia varia praxesque operationum arithmeticarum, itemque regulae aureae simplicis compositae etc. cumprimis ad usus mercatorum et civiles applicatae. Claudiopoli, 1755.
- Elementa mathematica naturali philosophiae ancillantia ad praefixam in scholis normam concinnata. I. Elementa Arithmeticae numericae et litteralis seu Algebrae. Claudiopoli, 1755.
- Exercitationum mathematicarum partes tres. Vindobonae, 1755.
- Ephemerides astronomicae ad meridianum Vindobonensem. Vindobonae 1756-1793.
- Ephemerides astronomicae anni bissexti 1760 (in Latin). Wien: Johann Thomas von Trattner (1.). 1760.
- Exercitationum mathematicarum partes tres, una cum Exercitationibus arithmeticis et regula Rabbatae, Anatocismi et iuris civilis de quarta Falcidia. Viennae, 1759.
- Elementa Algebrae Authore R. P. Maximiliano Hell e S. J. Posnaniae, typis S. J. 1760.
- Dissertatio complectens calculos accuratissimos transitus Veneris per discum Solis in tertiam Iuni 1769. praedicti, methodosque varias observationem hanc instituendi. Viennae, 1760.
- Kurzer Unterricht der Oster-Feyer für den ungelehrten, gemeinen Mann, samt der gründlichen Wiederlegung einer Schrift, welche Herr Christoph Sigismund Schumacher, Calender-Schreiber in Dresden unter den Innschrift: Untersuchung der Oster-Feyer von anno 1700 bis 2500 verfasst u. anno 1760 in Druck gegeben hat. Wien, 1760.
- Introductio ad utilem usum Magnetis ex chalybe. Viennae, 1762.
- Ephemerides astronomicae anni 1762 (in Latin). Wien: Johann Thomas von Trattner (1.). 1762.
- Transitus Veneris ante discum Solis anni 1761. die Astron. 5. Junii calculis definitus et methodo observandi illustratus a Max. Hell S. J. Vindobonae, é.n.
- Tabulae Solares ad Meridianum Parisianum, quas novissimis suis observationibus deduxit vir celeberrimus Nicolaus Ludovicus de Caille… Cum supplemento reliquarum tabularum solarium, quas supputavit Maximilianus Hell Astronomus Caesareo-Regius. Editio post primam Parisianam anni 1758 altera et auctior. Vindobonae, 1763.
- Tabulae lunares ad meridianum Parisianum, quas supputavit vir Cl. Tobias Mayer. - cum supplemento reliquarum tabularum Lunarium D. Cassini, de la Lande et P. Hell. Bécs, 1763.
- Tabulae planetarum Saturni, Jovis, Martis, Veneris et Mercurii ad Meridianum Parisianum, quas supputavit vir cel. D. Ioannes Cassini … correctis typi erroribus et adiectis tabulis perturbationum, aberrationum et nutationum D. de la Lande, D. Euleri, D. Mayer cum earumdem praeceptis concinnatis a P. Max. Hell. Viennae, 1763.
- Ephemerides astronomicae anni 1763 (in Latin). Wien: Johann Thomas von Trattner (1.). 1763.
- Dissertatio de satellite Veneris a pluribus Astronomis viso, illusione optica. Viennae, 1765.
- Ephemerides astronomicae anni 1765 (in Latin). Wien: Johann Thomas von Trattner (1.). 1765.
- Elogium Rustici Tyrolensis Petri Anich Oberperfuessensis coloni, tornatoris etc. Viennae, 1766.
- Observationes astronomicae ab anno 1717. ad annum 1752. a patribus Soc. Jesu Kögler etc. Pekini factae et a P. Augustino Hallerstein S. J. Tribunalis mathematici Praeside 1772 collectae, ac in Europam missae. Ad fidem autographi Manuscripti edidit P. Hell. Viennae, 1768.
- Observatio transitus Veneris ante discum Solis die 3. Junii anno 1769. Wardoëhusii etc. Hafniae, 1770.
- Dissertatio de parallaxi Solis ex Observationibus Transitus Veneris 1769. Viennae, 1772.
- Methodus astronomica sine usu Quadrantis vel Sectoris aut alterius cuiusvis instrumenti in gradus circuli divisi … elevationem cujusvis in continente siti loci accuratissime determinandi. Wien, 1775.
- Max Hell's Schreiben über die alhier in Wien entdeckte Magnetenkur, an einen seiner Freunde. Wien, 1775.
- Unpartheiischer Bericht der alhier gemachten Entdeckungen der künstlichen Stahlmagneten in verschiedenen Nervenkrankheiten. Wien, 1775.
- Erklärung über das zweite Schreiben Herrn D. Mesmers die Magnetenkur betreffend an das Publikum. Wien, 1775.
- Von der wahren Grösse, die der Durchmesser des vollen Mondes zu haben scheint, wenn man mit freyem Auge ansieht. (Beyträge zu den verschiedenen Wissenschaften, 1775.)
- Monumenta aere perenniora inter astra ponenda etc. Wien, 1789.
- Tabula geographica Ungariae veteris ex historia Anonymi Belae regi notarii. Pestini, 1801.
- Sacharum praeservativum adversus scorbutum cum Epistola D. Alberitz Med. Doctoris. (?)

== See also ==
- List of Jesuit scientists
- List of Roman Catholic scientist-clerics
