= Deslandres (crater) =

Lunar impact crater

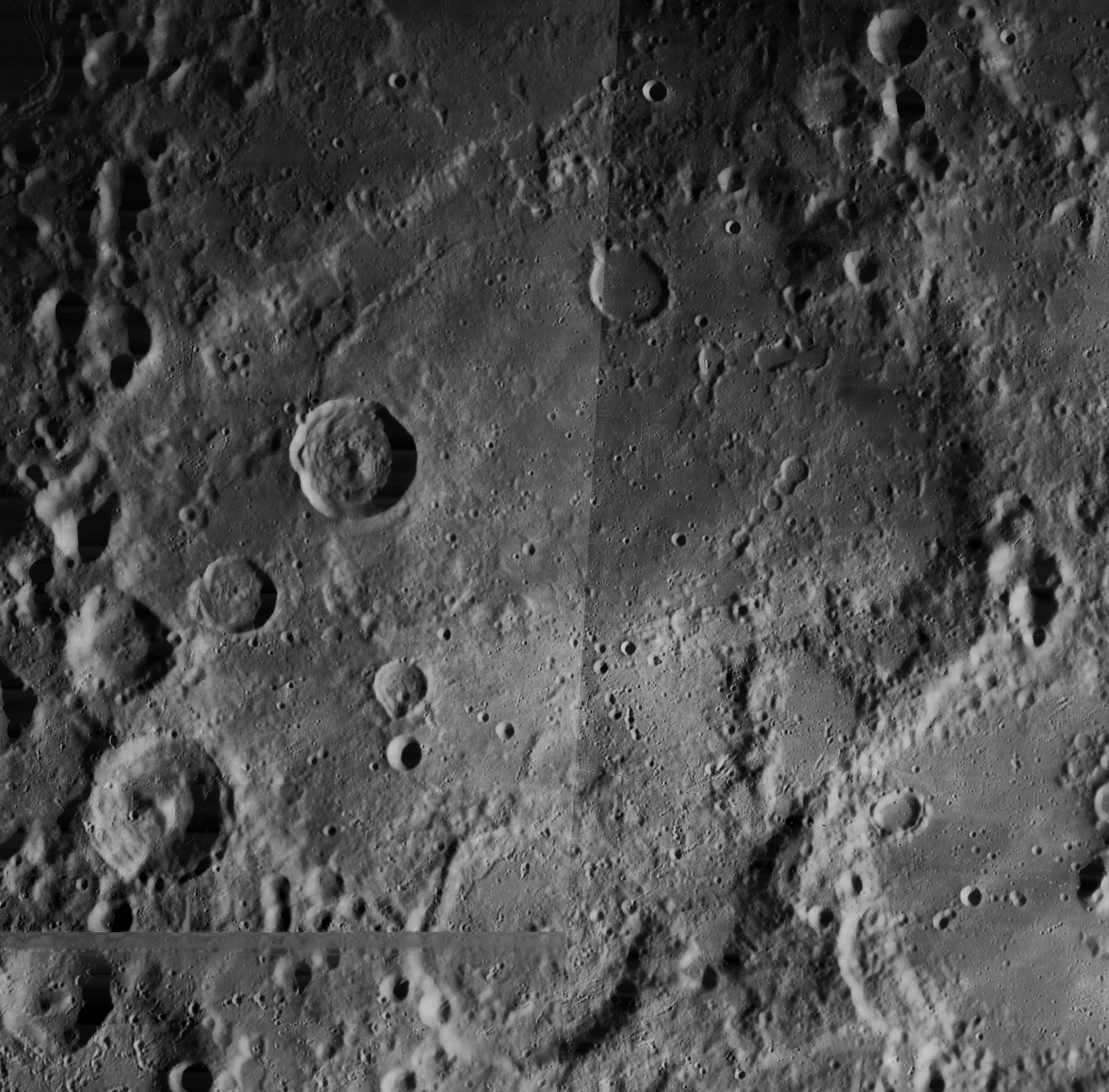
- Mosaic of Lunar Orbiter 4 images
- Coordinates: 32.55°S 5.57°W
- Diameter: 227.02 km (141.06 mi)
- Depth: Unknown
- Colongitude: 5° at sunrise
- Formation: Pre-Nectarian
- Eponym: Henri A. Deslandres

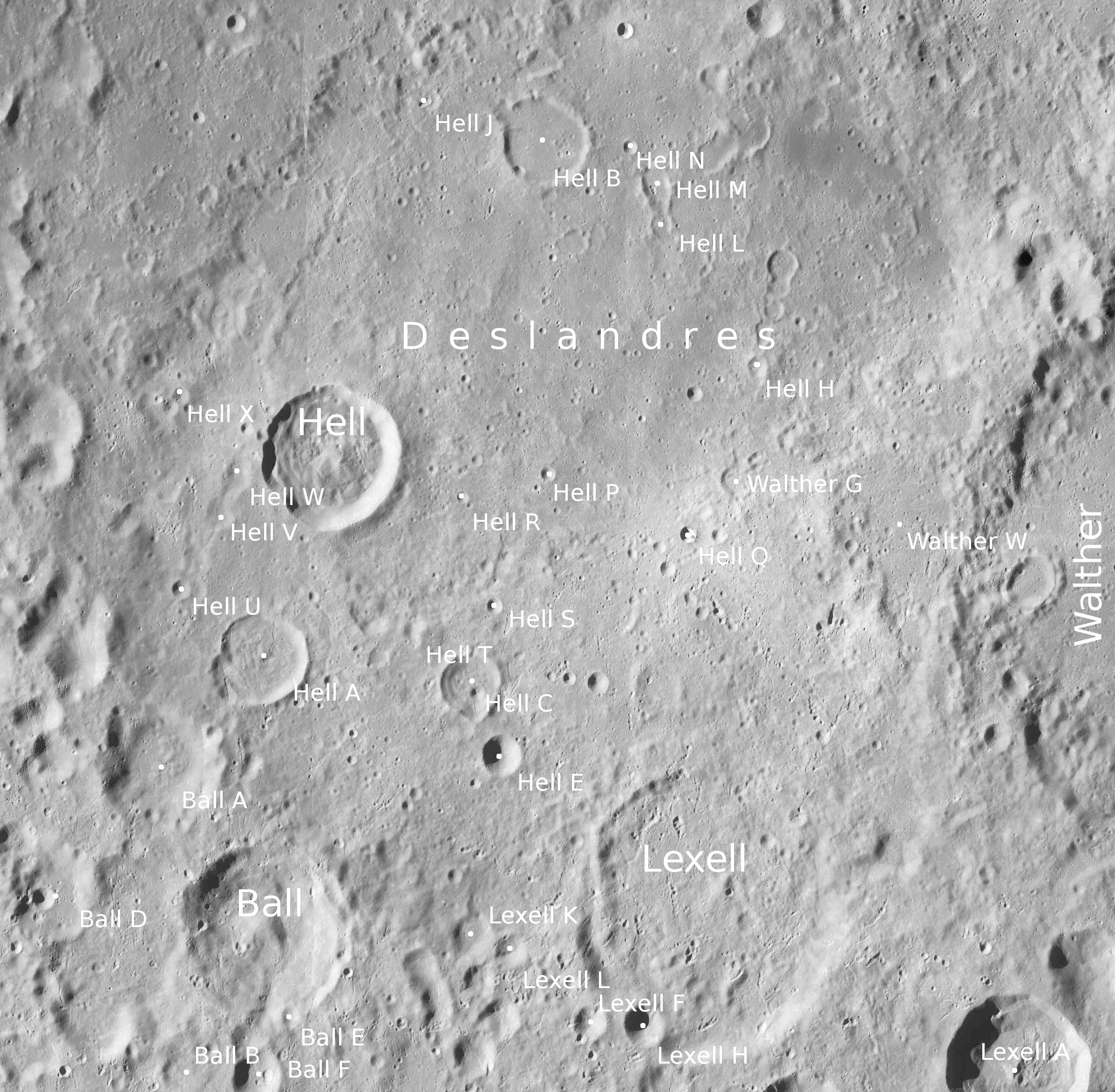
Named craters and satellites

Deslandres is the heavily worn and distorted remains of a lunar impact crater. It dates to the Pre-Nectarian period of the lunar geologic timescale. The crater is located to the southeast of the Mare Nubium, in the rugged southern highlands of the Moon. In dimension it is the third-largest crater formation on the visible Moon, being beaten only by Clavius (231 km) and by the 303-kilometer-diameter walled plain Bailly. The northern and eastern parts of the floor display a relatively level surface, but it is pock-marked with numerous craters. There is a small region of mare material, due to basaltic lava, along the eastern interior floor.

The crater Walther is attached to the remnant of the eastern rim, and Ball intrudes into the southwestern rim. The crater remnant Lexell has broken across the southeastern rim, forming a "harbor" in the crater floor due to the wide gap in its northern rim. The irregular crater Regiomontanus is attached to the northeast rim of Deslandres. The crater Hell lies entirely within the western rim, and Deslandres is sometimes referred to as Hell Plain.

The satellite crater Hell Q lies at the center of a patch of higher albedo surface located in the eastern half of Deslandres. Around the time of the full moon this feature is one of the brightest spots on the lunar surface. The light hue indicates a relatively youthful feature in lunar geological terms. This patch is sometimes referred to as "Cassini's bright spot", as it was first mapped by Cassini in 1672 at the Paris Observatory.

This feature is so heavily eroded and degraded by overlapping impacts that it was not recognized as a crater formation until the 20th century. On older maps, it was named after the Austrian engineer Hanns Hörbiger by Philipp Fauth. It is now named after the French astrophysicist Henri A. Deslandres (1853-1948). The designation for this formation was suggested by Eugène M. Antoniadi in 1942, and was adopted during the general assembly of the International Astronomical Union in 1948.

According to one source, Luna 5 impacted the lunar surface in this crater (31°S 8°W). The first released images from the Lunar Reconnaissance Orbiter in 2009 were of the area in the southern part of this crater.
