= 2004 Lexell =

Florian asteroid

Discovery
- Discovered by: N. Chernykh
- Discovery site: Crimean Astrophysical Obs.
- Discovery date: 22 September 1973

Designations
- Named after: Anders Johan Lexell (Swedish-Russian astronomer)
- Alternative designations: 1973 SV_{2} · 1938 WL; 1941 SN_{1} · 1959 GC; 1972 HK
- Minor planet category: main-belt · Flora

Orbital characteristics
- Epoch 4 September 2017 (JD 2458000.5)
- Uncertainty parameter 0
- Observation arc: 78.55 yr (28,689 days)
- Aphelion: 2.3451 AU
- Perihelion: 1.9986 AU
- Semi-major axis: 2.1718 AU
- Eccentricity: 0.0798
- Orbital period (sidereal): 3.20 yr (1,169 days)
- Mean anomaly: 215.94°
- Mean motion: 0° 18^{m} 28.44^{s} / day
- Inclination: 2.4967°
- Longitude of ascending node: 4.5440°
- Argument of perihelion: 58.504°

Physical characteristics
- Dimensions: 7.255±0.216 km 7.456±0.084 km 7.82 km (calculated); 14.7 km
- Synodic rotation period: 5.44±0.02 h 5.441±0.002 h 5.4429±0.0003 h
- Geometric albedo: 0.056; 0.24 (assumed); 0.2908±0.0522; 0.306±0.041
- Spectral type: LS · S
- Absolute magnitude (H): 12.6 · 12.7 · 12.908±0.064 · 13.04±0.00

2004 Lexell, provisional designation 1973 SV_{2}, is a stony Florian asteroid from the inner regions of the asteroid belt, approximately 7.5 kilometers in diameter. The asteroid was discovered on 22 September 1973, by Soviet astronomer Nikolai Chernykh at the Crimean Astrophysical Observatory in Nauchnij, on the Crimean peninsula, and later named for Swedish-Russian astronomer and mathematician Anders Johan Lexell.

== Classification and orbit ==
Lexell is a member of the Flora family, one of the largest collisional populations of stony asteroids. It orbits the Sun at a distance of 2.0–2.3 AU once every 3 years and 2 months (1,169 days). Its orbit has an eccentricity of 0.08 and an inclination of 2° with respect to the ecliptic.

The asteroid was first identified as 1938 WL at the Finnish Turku Observatory in November 1938, extending the body's observation arc by 35 years prior to its official discovery observation at Nauchnij.

== Physical characteristics ==
Pan-STARRS' photometric survey characterized Lexell as a LS-type asteroid, which transitions between the common S-type and rare L-type asteroid.

=== Rotation period ===
In March 2013, two rotational lightcurves of Lexell were obtained from photometric observations by Gary Haagen at Stonegate Observatory, Massachusetts, and by a group of astronomers at the Oakley Southern Sky Observatory (E09), Australia. Lightcurve analysis gave a well-defined rotation period of 5.441 and 5.4429 hours with a brightness variation of 0.45 and 0.42 magnitude, respectively (U=3/3).

In February 2013, observations made by French amateur astronomer Pierre Antonini gave a concurring period of 5.44 hours with an amplitude of 0.51 magnitude (U=3-).

=== Diameter and albedo ===
According to the survey carried out by the NEOWISE mission of NASA's Wide-field Infrared Survey Explorer, Lexell measures 7.255 and 7.456 kilometers in diameter and its surface has an albedo of 0.306 and 0.2908, respectively. The Collaborative Asteroid Lightcurve Link assumes an albedo of 0.24 – derived from 8 Flora, the largest member and namesake of the Flora family – and calculates a diameter of 7.82 kilometers based on an absolute magnitude of 12.7.

== Naming ==
This minor planet was named after Anders Johan Lexell (1740–1784), a Swedish-Russian astronomer and mathematician. The official naming citation was published by the Minor Planet Center on 15 October 1977 (M.P.C. 4238). The lunar crater Lexell was also named in his honor, as is Lexell's Comet, of which he computed its orbit.
