= Johann Friedrich Anthing =

German artist and historian (1753–1805)

Johann Friedrich Anthing (1753–1805) was a German soldier, artist and historian.

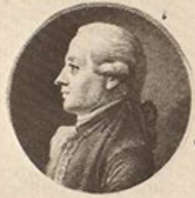
Self-portrait by Anthing, 1789.

== Biography ==
Johann Friedrich Anthing was born on 26 May 1753 in Gotha (then in the Saxe-Coburg Duchy, now in Thuringia). After his theological studies in Iena, Anthing travelled across Europe, going from one royal court to the next, as a silhouette artist. He drew portraits of princes, courtiers and famous personalities such as Goethe during his stay at the Weimar court (1789).

He was employed in Saint-Petersburg from 1783 and drew portraits of members of the imperial family, including Grand Duke Paul Petrovitch (then Paul I of Russia) and his wife Maria Fedorovna, as well as members of the Saint Petersburg Academy of Sciences.

Anthing travelled to Frankfurt in 1790 to attend the crowning of Leopold II, and he published a description of the ceremony. In 1793, Anthing returned to Russia and became Marshal Alexander Suvorov's Aide-de-camp. He later wrote a three-volume biography of Suvorov (History of the Campaigns of Marshal Suvorov). After the crowning of Paul I and Suvorov's subsequent disgrace in 1797, Anthing resigned. He spent the last years of his life in Saint-Petersburg and died on 12 August 1805.

== Personal life ==
Married to a Frenchwoman, he had a daughter, Johanna Maria Sophia "Sophinka" d'Anthing (1799–1823), who settled in France. He was also the elder brother of general Karl Heinrich Wilhelm Anthing.

== Some of his drawings ==
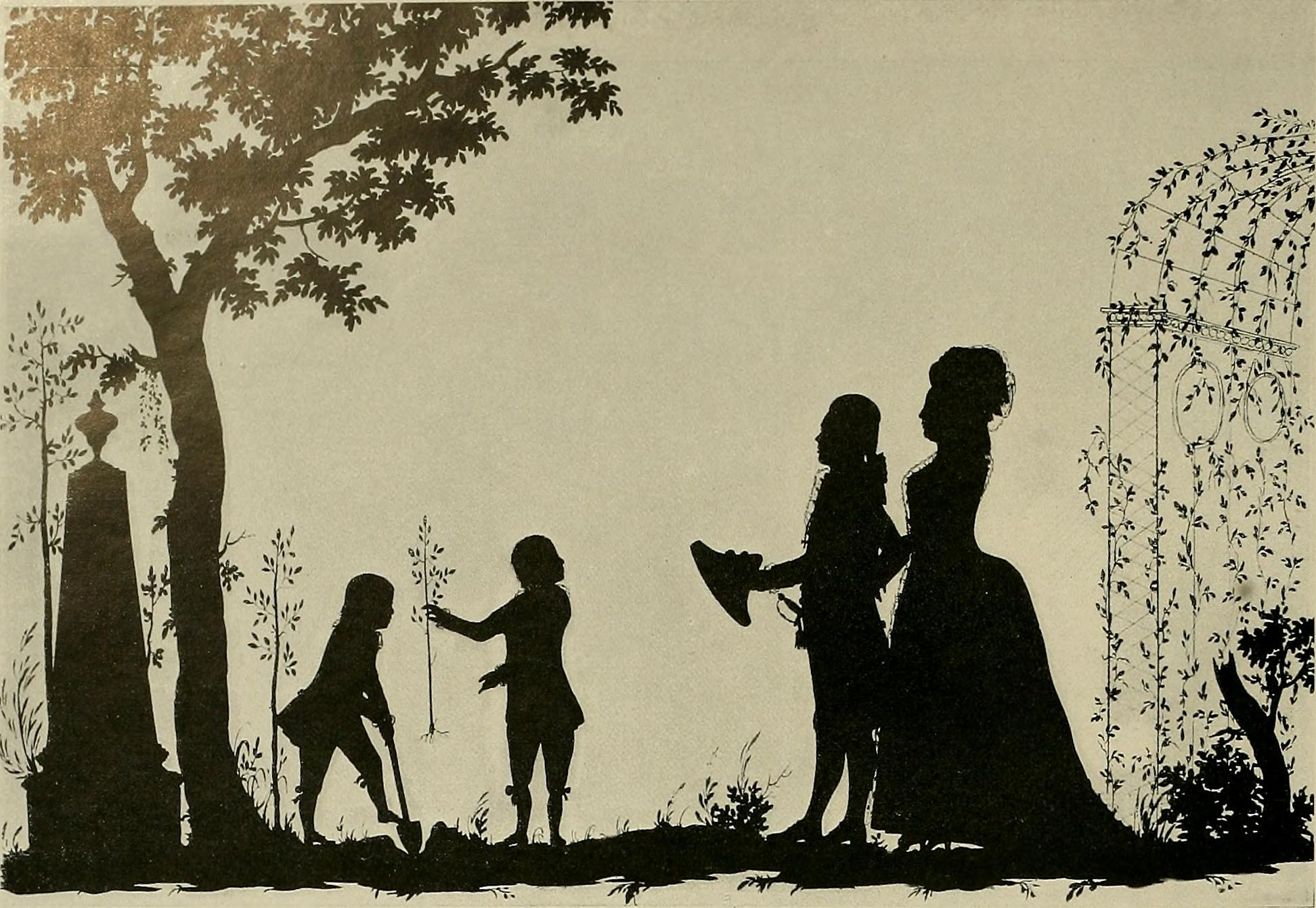
Silhouettes of Paul Petrovitch, Maria Fedorovna and their children

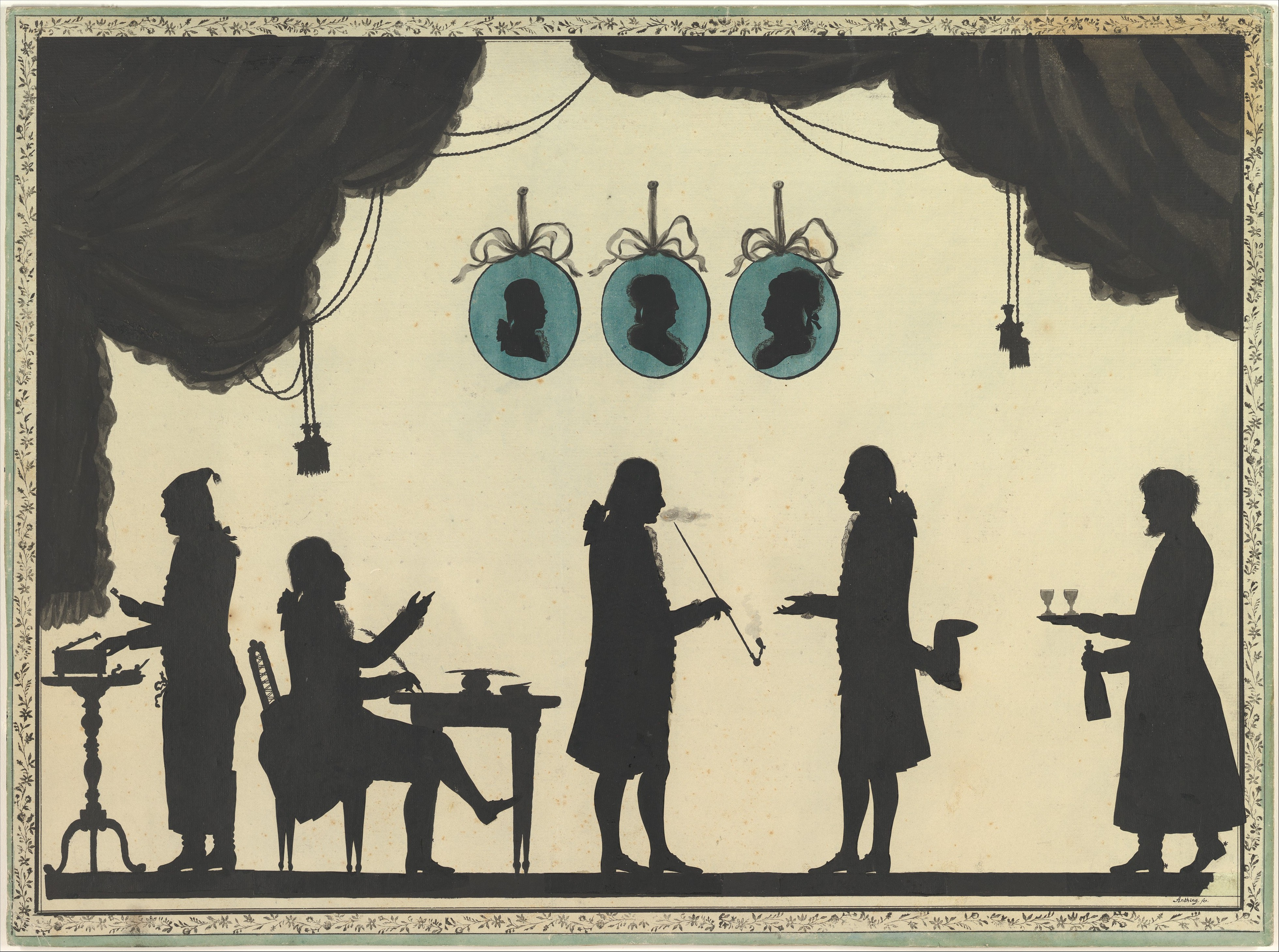
Silhouette of David Roentgen in the imperial cabinet

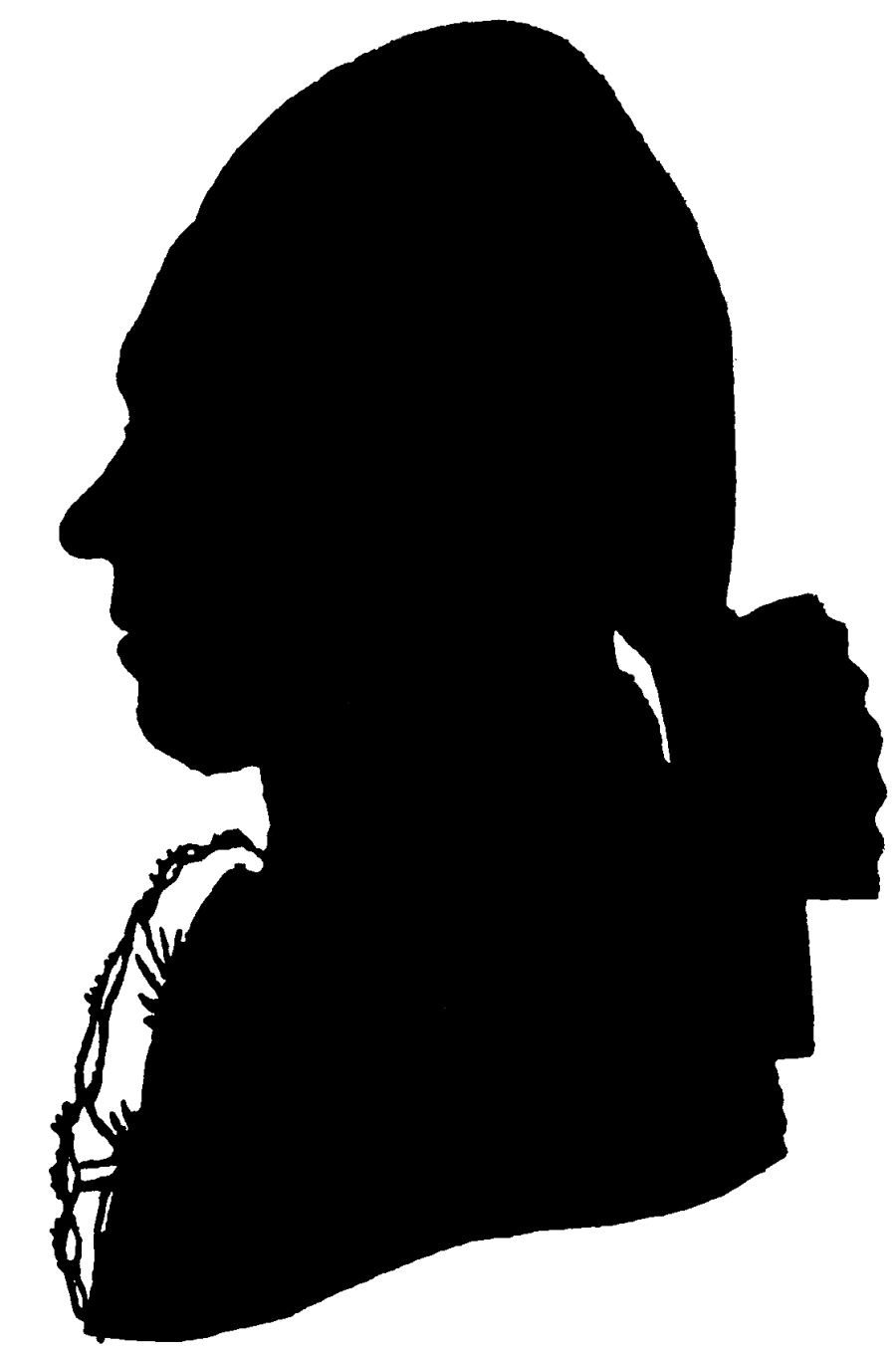
Peter Simon Pallas

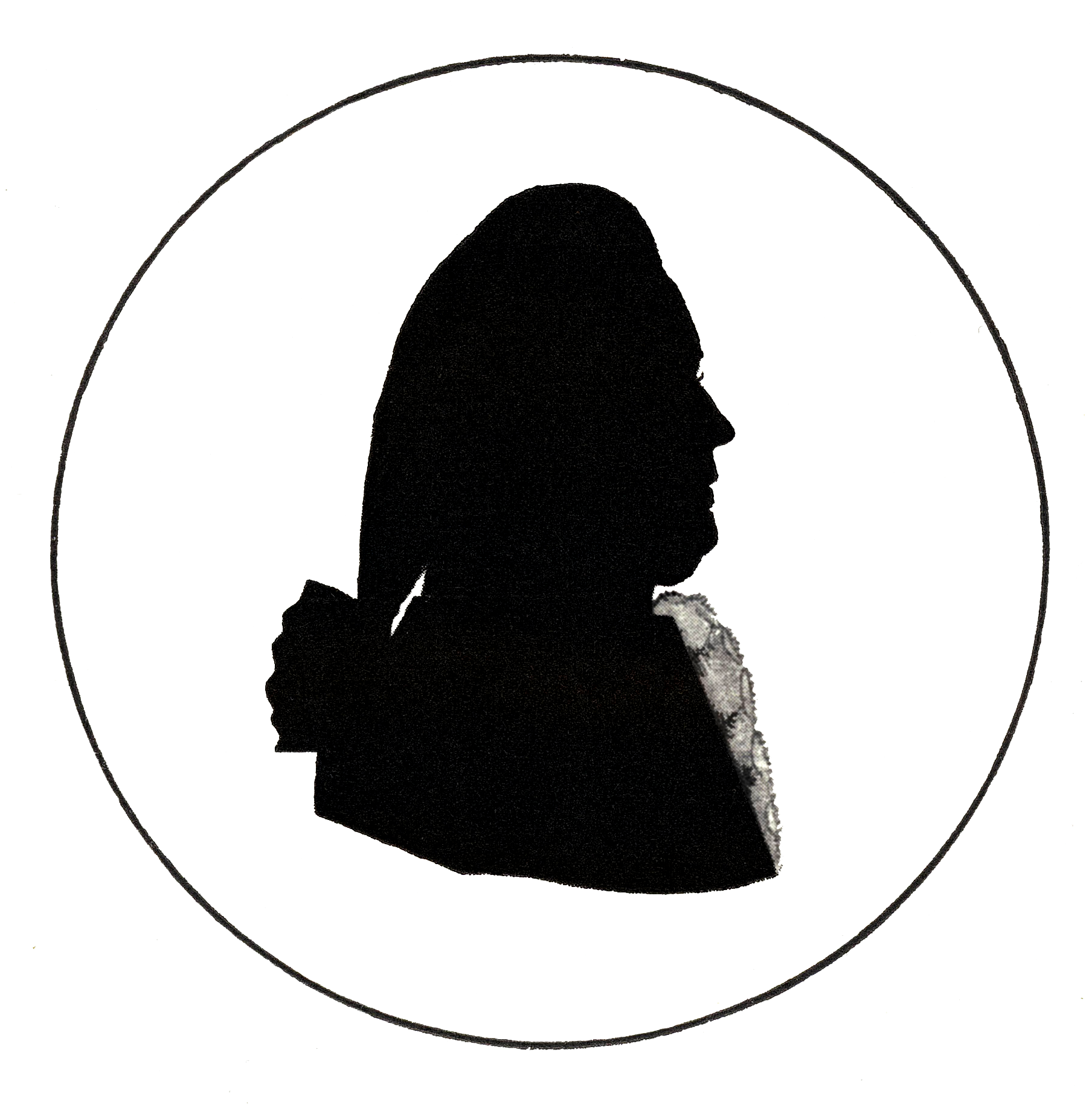
Anders Johan Lexell

== Selected works ==
- Recueil de cent silhouettes de personnes illustres et célèbres dessinées d'après les originaux (1791). In French, on the Deutsche Forschungsgemeinschaft's website :
- Über Russland, seine Landesart, Sitten, Luxus, Moden und Ergötzlichkeiten (1791)
- Versuch einer Kriegs-Geschichte des Grafen Alex. Suworow (1795–1799) (English : History of the Campaigns of Prince Alexander Suworow Rymnikski, Field-Marshal-General in the Service of His Imperial Majesty, the Emperor of Russia) :

== Sources ==
- "Антинг, Фридрих" . Brockhaus and Efron Encyclopedic Dictionary (in Russian). 1906.
- Short biography in German of Johann Friedrich Anthing on the National German Library's website (Deutschen Nationalbibliothek) :
- Anthing, Johann Friedrich (2002). History of the Campaigns of Prince Alexander Suworow Rymnikski, Field-Marshal-General in the Service of His Imperial Majesty, the Emperor of Russia. BookSurge Publishing.
- Schüddekopf, Johann Friedrich (1913). Johann Friedrich Anthing. Eine Skizze. Weimar: Gesellschaft der Bibliophilen. (Johann Friedrich Anthing. A drawing)
