= Jan Lexell =

Swedish physician and academic (born 1958)

Jan Lexell (born March 13, 1958) is a Swedish physician and academic, who is a specialist in rehabilitation medicine and neurology. He is head of the rehabilitation medicine research group in the Department of Health Sciences at Lund University, Lund. One of his research areas is the effect of physical activity on the aging process. Lexell is also senior consultant in the Department of Neurology and Rehabilitation Medicine at Skane University Hospital, Lund. Lexell's research is frequently cited; in particular, his work during the 1980s on examining the vastus lateralis muscle immediately post-mortem, which helped identify an atrophy in type-2 fiber area in older people, Some of his most important research was carried out in 1989–90, while working at the University of Liverpool, UK, with grants from several major Swedish medical organisations.

== Sports medicine ==
Lexell is actively engaged in sports medicine, in particular paralympic sports medicine. Lexell is a standing member of the Medical committee in the International Paralympic Committee (IPC), and was directly involved in preparing Sweden's paralympic athletes for the 2016 Summer Paralympics in Rio. He was a contributor to the Textbook of Sports Medicine: Basic Science and Clinical Aspects of Sports Injury and Physical Activity, published by Wiley in 2003, revised 2008.

== Awards ==
- 2017 – honorary doctorate (h.c.) at Luleå University of Technology, Luleå, Sweden.
