= Lexell (crater) =

Lunar impact crater in the southern part of the Moon

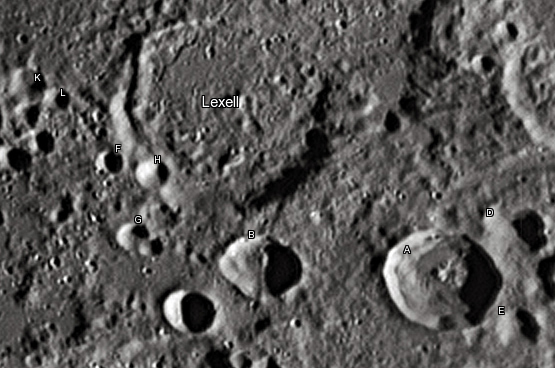
- Lexell crater and its satellite craters taken from Earth in 2012 at the University of Hertfordshire's Bayfordbury Observatory with the telescopes Meade LX200 14" and Lumenera Skynyx 2-1
- Coordinates: 35.8°S 4.2°W
- Diameter: 63 km
- Depth: 2.2 km
- Colongitude: 5° at sunrise
- Eponym: Anders Johan Lexell

Lexell is a lunar impact crater that lies across the southeastern rim of the huge walled plain named Deslandres, in the southern part of the Moon. It was named after Swedish-Russian mathematician and astronomer Anders Johan Lexell. To the northeast is the walled plain Walther, and to the south is Orontius, another walled plain.

This is a somewhat irregular formation with a wide break in the northern rim. The western rim forms a low, arcing wall, and is overlain to the southwest by Lexell H after passing the rim of Deslandres. The rim peaks along the southeast, then comes to an end at a rugged promontory-like ridge. The interior floor has been resurfaced by lava to the northwest and in sections of the remainder of the floor. There are some low rises and ghost-crater rims in the southeast half part of the interior floor.

== Satellite craters ==
By convention these features are identified on lunar maps by placing the letter on the side of the crater midpoint that is closest to Lexell.

Lexell	Latitude	Longitude	Diameter
A	36.9° S	1.4° W	34 km
B	37.3° S	3.4° W	23 km
D	36.1° S	0.7° W	20 km
E	37.2° S	0.4° W	16 km
F	36.5° S	5.4° W	8 km
G	37.2° S	4.9° W	10 km
H	36.5° S	4.9° W	10 km
K	35.9° S	6.4° W	10 km
L	36.0° S	6.0° W	8 km
