= Blanchard (crater) =

Lunar impact crater

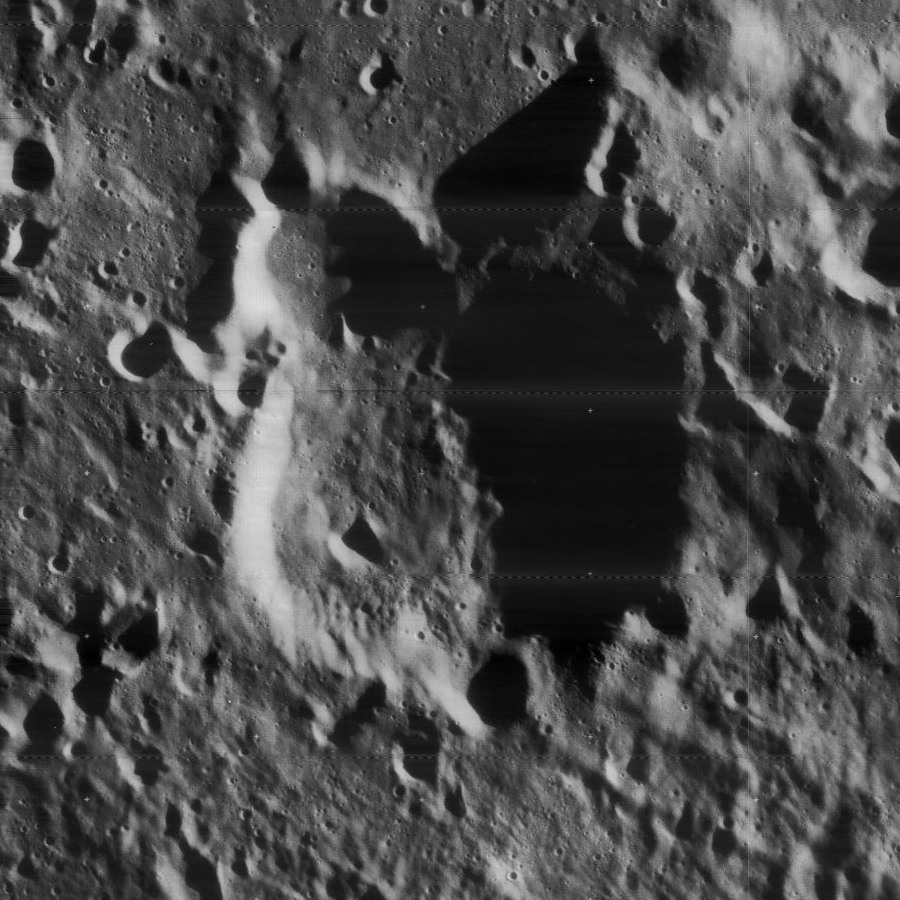
- Lunar Orbiter 4 image
- Coordinates: 58.25°S 93.50°W
- Diameter: 37.46 km (23.28 mi)
- Depth: Unknown
- Colongitude: 95° at sunrise
- Eponym: Jean P. F. Blanchard

Blanchard is a lunar impact crater that lies on the far side of the Moon, just behind the southwestern limb. It lies within the Mendel-Rydberg Basin, a 630 km wide impact basin of Nectarian age. Blanchard is located to the south-southwest of the crater Arrhenius, and northwest of Pilâtre. Further to the south is the rugged terrain to the north of Hausen, a walled plain.

The rim of Blanchard is worn and rounded, with a slight elongation along a northeastern direction. There is a break in the northwest rim. The two crater formations have nearly merged, and share the same interior floor. The remainder of the rim has several other breaks caused by impacts, particularly along the southeastern rim. The interior floor, although somewhat rough, does not contain a central peak or notable features.

Previously identified as Arrhenius P, a satellite feature of Arrhenius crater, this formation was named after French aeronaut Jean-Pierre Blanchard. Its designation was adopted by the IAU in 1991.
