= Chadwick (crater) =

Crater on the Moon

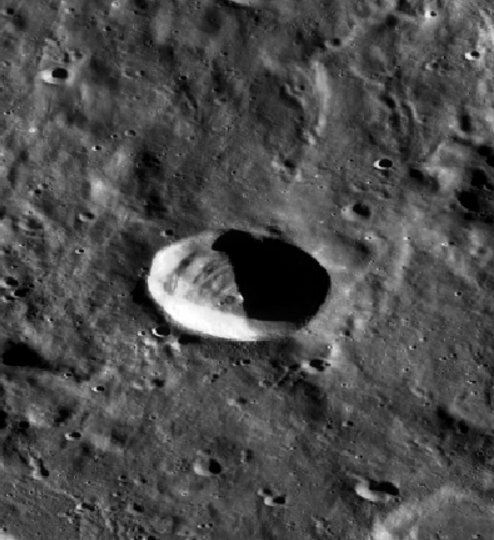
- LRO image of Chadwick
- Coordinates: 52.7°S 101.3°W
- Diameter: 29.74 km (18.48 mi)
- Depth: Unknown
- Colongitude: 101° at sunrise
- Eponym: James Chadwick

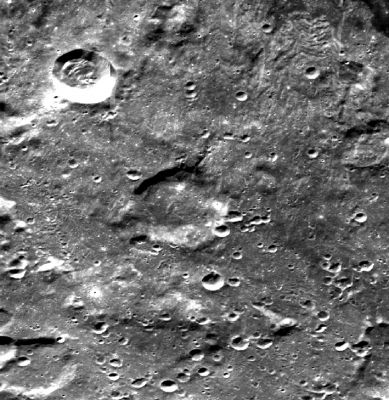
Clementine image, with De Roy at center and Chadwick in upper left

Chadwick is a lunar impact crater that lies on the far side of the Moon's surface, just beyond the southwestern limb. It lies to the northwest of the crater De Roy, within the Mendel-Rydberg Basin, a 630 km wide impact basin of Nectarian age. Further to the northwest of Chadwick is the larger crater Mendel. This region of the lunar surface lies at the southern end of the ejecta blanket that surrounds the Mare Orientale impact basin.

Chadwick is roughly circular with a sharp-edged rim. The inner wall is somewhat wider to the south-southeast, giving the crater a slight outward bulge toward De Roy. The rim has not been significantly worn, and is not marked by any impacts of note. The interior surface has a somewhat uneven appearance. The infrared spectrum of pure crystalline plagioclase has been identified on the northeast, southeast, and south walls, as well as an unnamed crater to the southwest.

Previously designated De Roy X, this crater is named after British physicist James Chadwick (1891-1974), the 1935 Nobel laureate for his discovery of the neutron. Its designation was formally adopted by the International Astronomical Union in 1985.
