= Steklov =

Steklov (Cyrillic: Стеклов) is a Russian last name. It may refer to:

- Steklov (surname)
- Steklov (crater), a lunar impact crater on the far side of the Moon
- Steklov Institute of Mathematics, part of the Russian Academy of Sciences
- The KGB's nickname for Norwegian Prime Minister Jens Stoltenberg
