= Hausen (crater) =

Lunar surface depression

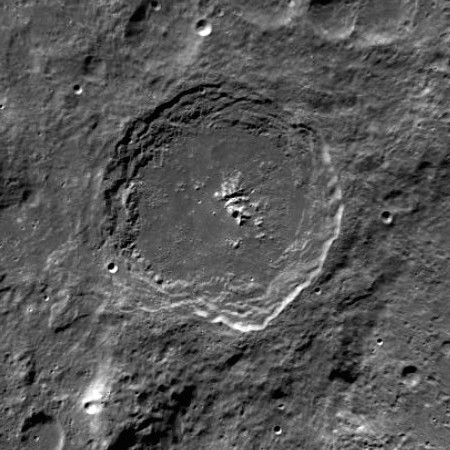
- LRO image
- Coordinates: 65.11°S 88.49°W
- Diameter: 163.24 km (101.43 mi)
- Depth: 5.30 km (3.29 mi)
- Colongitude: 95° at sunrise
- Formation: Eratosthenian
- Eponym: Christian A. Hausen

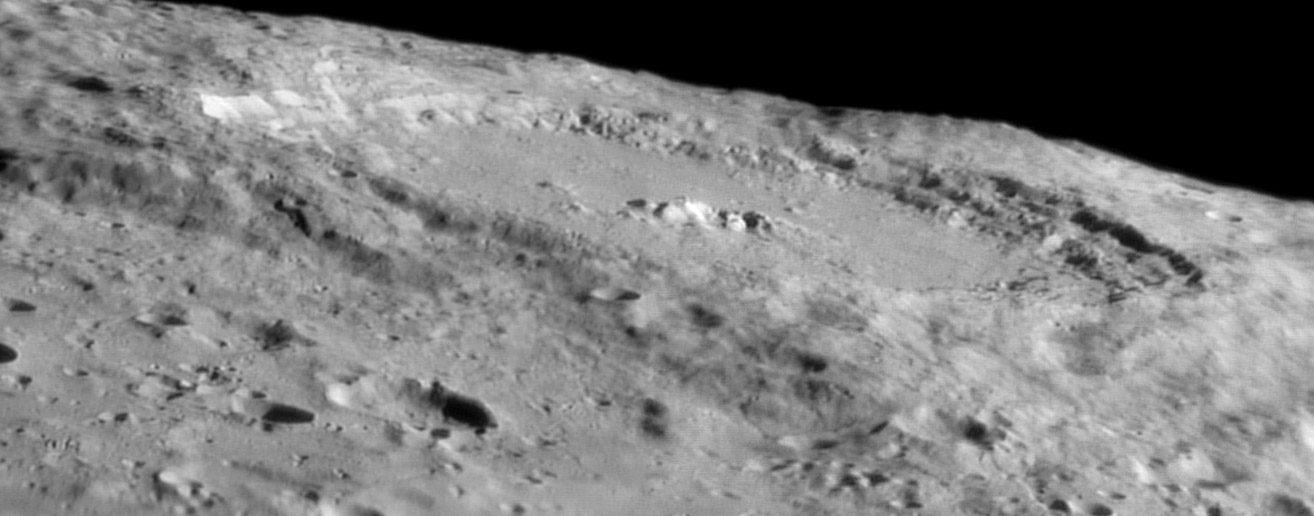
Excellent earth-based image by Frederic Mallmann

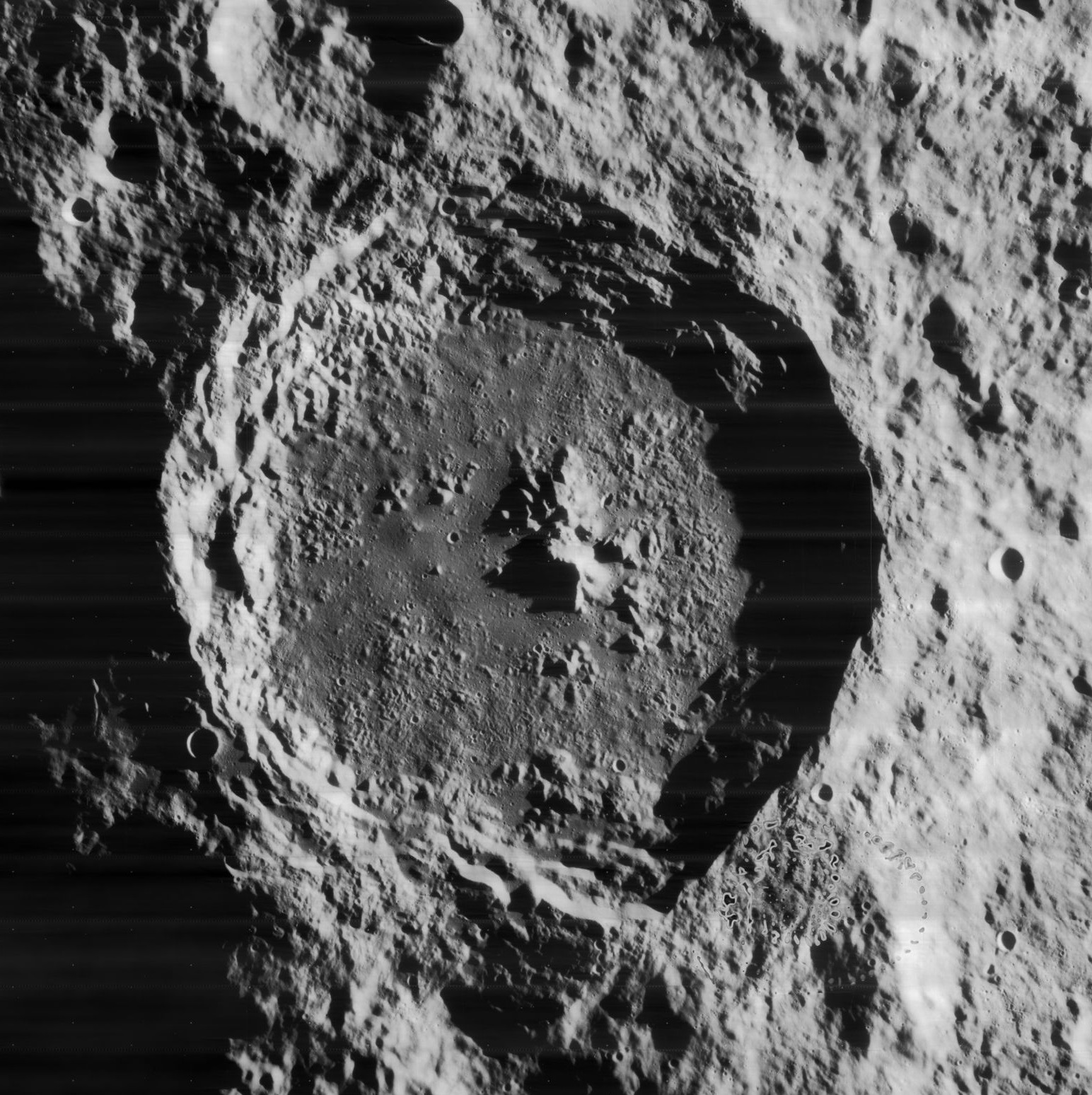
Lunar Orbiter 4 image (spots at lower right are blemishes on original)

Hausen is a large lunar impact crater that lies along the south-southwestern limb of the Moon. It was named after German astronomer Christian A. Hausen by the IAU in 1961.

The visibility of this crater is significantly affected by libration effects, although even under the very best of conditions it is viewed nearly from on edge. It lies along the western edge of Bailly, an immense walled plain. To the northeast is the crater Pingré on the near side, and to the north is the Arrhenius just on the far side of the lunar limb.

This formation dates to the Eratosthenian period on the lunar geologic timescale. The rim is generally circular, with an outward bulge to the south-southeast. The inner wall is terraced at the northern and southern ends, and is more irregular along the eastern and western flanks. The rim along the east and southeast flanks displays slumping, producing a sharp edge. It is not significantly eroded or overlaid by craters, with only a single small craterlet along the southwest rim.

The interior floor is generally level, with a few sites of rough terrain. There is a complex formation of central peaks offset somewhat to the east of the midpoint. This formation extends further in the north–south direction and consists of several ridges separated by valleys. The infrared spectrum of pure crystalline plagioclase has been identified on these rises. There is a lower range of hills just to the southeast of this range and a small cluster of hills to the south.

Hausen is the largest crater of Eratosthenian age.

Hausen lies to the south of the Mendel-Rydberg Basin, a 630 km wide impact basin of Nectarian age.

== Satellite craters ==
The following craters have been renamed by the IAU:

- Hausen A — See Chappe.
- Hausen B — See Pilâtre.
