= Chappe (crater) =

Lunar surface depression

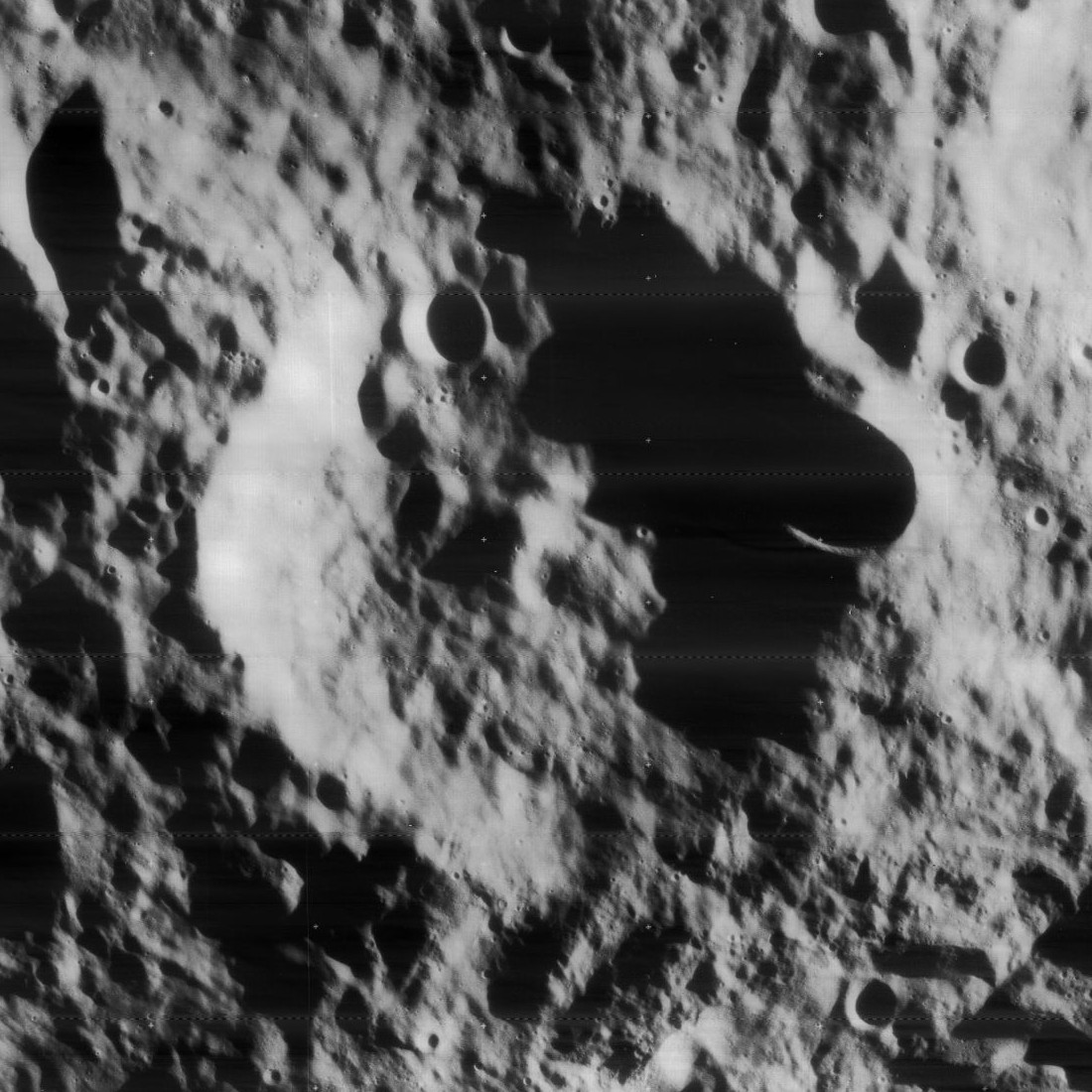
- Lunar Orbiter 4 image
- Coordinates: 61.29°S 91.24°W
- Diameter: 55.79 km (34.67 mi)
- Depth: Unknown
- Colongitude: 93° at sunrise
- Eponym: J.-B. Chappe d'Auteroche

Chappe is a degraded lunar impact crater that lies along the southwestern limb of the Moon. It is nearly attached to the northern limb of the walled plain designated Hausen, and an equal distance from the crater Pilâtre to the northeast. To the north-northwest is Blanchard. Chappe lies to the south of the Mendel-Rydberg Basin, a 630 km wide impact basin of Nectarian age.

This crater lies along the outer rampart of the much larger Hausen, and is surrounded by uneven, hummocky terrain. The rim is roughly circular, with a small crater lying along the eastern edge – this feature includes a permanently shadowed region. The inner walls and interior floor are uneven, particularly in the western half.

Originally designated Hausen A, this crater is named after French astronomer J.-B. Chappe d'Auteroche (1728-1769). He is best known for his observations of the transits of Venus in 1761 and 1769. Its designation was officially adopted by the International Astronomical Union in 1994.
