= Fenyi =

Fenyi may refer to:

- Fenyi County, in Jiangxi, China
- Fényi (crater), lunar crater on the far side of the Moon
- Gyula Fényi (1845–1927), Hungarian Jesuit and astronomer
