= Heyrovský =

Heyrovský may refer to:

People with the surname

- Jaroslav Heyrovský (1890–1967), Czech chemist and inventor
- Leopold Heyrovský (1892–1976), Czech entomologist and lawyer

Other uses

- Heyrovsky (crater), a lunar crater
- 3069 Heyrovský, an asteroid
