= De Roy (crater) =

Lunar impact crater

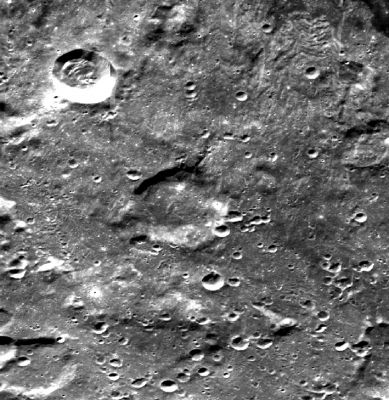
- Clementine image, with De Roy at center and Chadwick in upper left
- Coordinates: 55.3°S 99.1°W
- Diameter: 43.51 km (27.04 mi)
- Depth: Unknown
- Colongitude: 99° at sunrise
- Eponym: Felix de Roy

De Roy is a lunar impact crater that is located on the far side of the Moon, just behind the southwestern limb. This crater lies within the Mendel-Rydberg Basin, a 630 km wide impact basin of Nectarian age. De Roy is situated to the west of the crater Arrhenius, and east of the larger Lippmann.

This crater has a worn and rounded outer rim, forming a slightly irregular circle. A pair of tiny craterlets lie along the southeast rim, and there is a narrow cleft in the northern wall. The interior floor is level and nearly featureless, with only a few tiny crater pits to mark the surface.

This crater is named after Belgian journalist and amateur astronomer Felix de Roy (1883–1942), who was noted for his observation of variable stars. Its designation was formally adopted by the International Astronomical Union in 1970.

== Satellite craters ==
By convention these features are identified on lunar maps by placing the letter on the side of the crater midpoint that is closest to De Roy.

De Roy	Latitude	Longitude	Diameter
N	59.7° S	103.1° W	26 km
P	58.4° S	102.4° W	35 km
Q	58.1° S	103.6° W	22 km

The following crater has been renamed by the IAU.

- De Roy X — See Chadwick.
