= Mendel-Rydberg Basin =

Large lunar surface depression

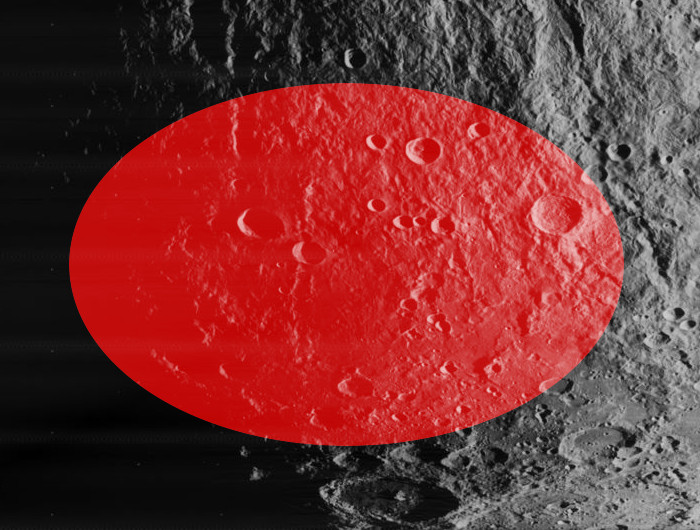
- Oblique Lunar Orbiter 4 image, with the approximate extent of the basin highlighted in red
- Coordinates: 50.0°S 094.0°W
- Diameter: 630 km
- Eponym: Mendel and Rydberg craters

The Mendel-Ryberg Basin is a Nectarian impact basin on the southwestern limb of the moon. It is named after the crater Mendel on the west margin and the smaller crater Rydberg north of the center of the basin. The basin is due south of the larger, younger Orientale basin. Ejecta and other geomorphological effects from the younger basin have overprinted the older one.

This feature was discovered in 1965 by William K. Hartmann and Gerard P. Kuiper, who termed it a "new basin on SE limb". It was given its present designation by Don E. Wilhelms and associates in 1979. The basin displays three concentric rings with diameters of 630, 460, and 200 km. It averages 5 to 6 km in depth. At the center is a mass concentration (mascon), or gravitational high. The mascon was first identified by Doppler tracking of the Lunar Prospector spacecraft. The existence of the basin was confirmed by the GRAIL spacecraft.

Other craters within the basin include Guthnick, De Roy, Arrhenius, Yakovkin, Graff, Andersson, Chadwick, Fényi, Blanchard, and Baade. Vallis Baade cuts tangentially across the northeast rim of the basin. Nearby craters just outside the outer rim include Drude, Chant, Steklov, Lippmann, Petzval, Chappe, Pilâtre, Hausen, Pingré, and Inghirami. The large crater Bailly is to the southeast, and to the west beyond Lippmann is the South Pole-Aitken Basin.

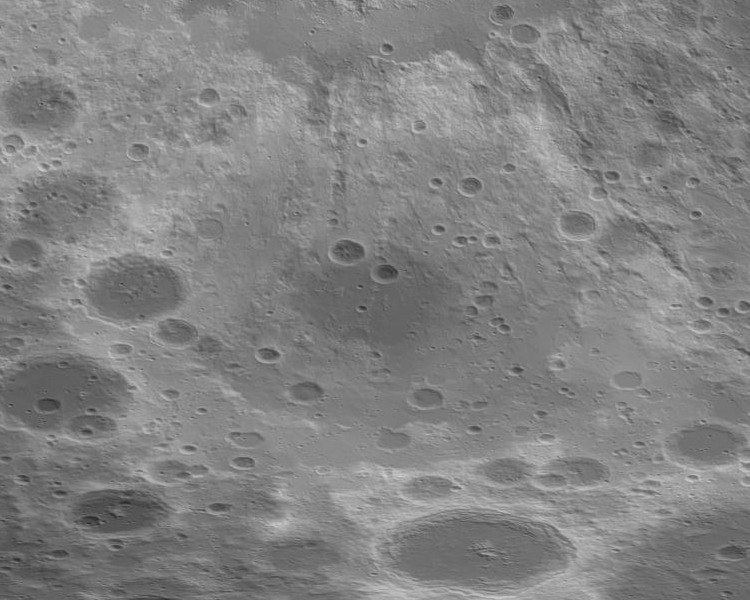
Topographic map

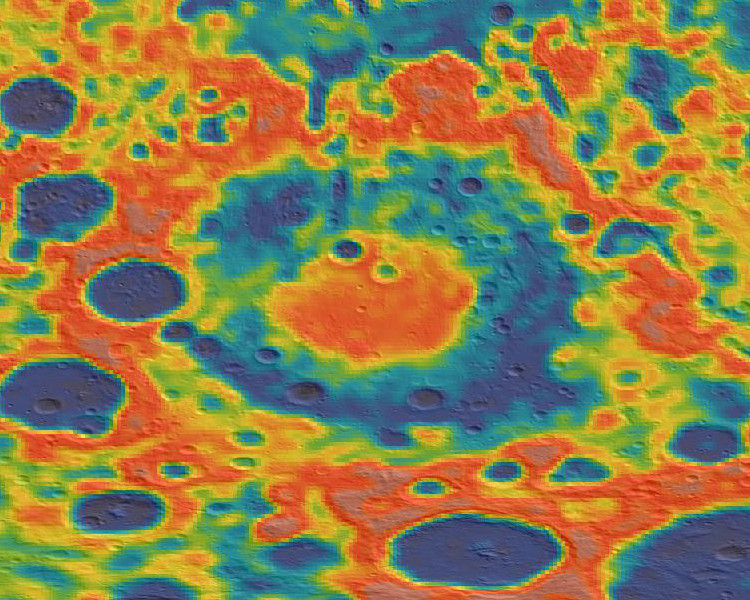
Gravity map based on GRAIL
