= Guthnick (crater) =

Crater on the Moon

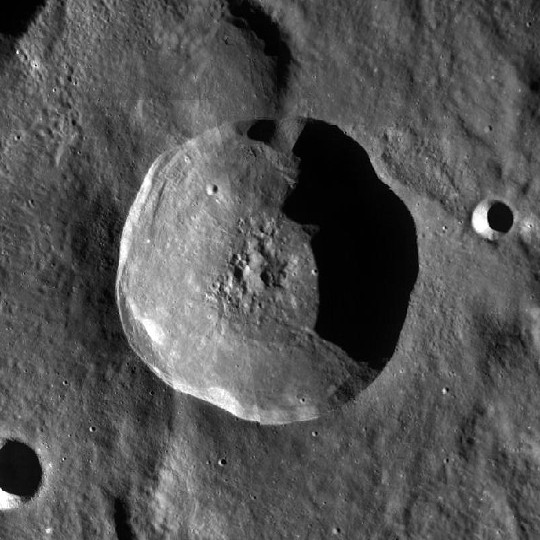
- LRO WAC image
- Coordinates: 47.7°S 93.9°W
- Diameter: 36 km
- Depth: Unknown
- Colongitude: 94° at sunrise
- Eponym: Paul Guthnick

Guthnick is a lunar impact crater that lies on the far side of the Moon's surface from the Earth. However, it is located in the part of the far side that is sometimes brought into sight of the Earth due to libration, although it can only be seen at a low angle and during favorable lighting conditions. Guthnick is situated in the southern portion of the huge skirt of ejecta that surrounds the Mare Orientale impact basin. Less than a crater diameter to the northwest is the slightly larger crater Rydberg. To the south-southwest is the small Andersson.

The outer rim of this crater is sharp-edged and free from significant erosion. There is a small outward bulge in the rim to the northeast, but otherwise the rim is nearly circular. The loose material on the inner surface has slumped down near the floor, forming a simple sloping edge around most of the sides. The small interior floor is located in the middle of this ring of talus. The interior is free of impacts of note.

This crater lies near the center of the Mendel-Rydberg Basin, a 630 km wide impact basin of Nectarian age.
