= Fényi (crater) =

Crater on the Moon

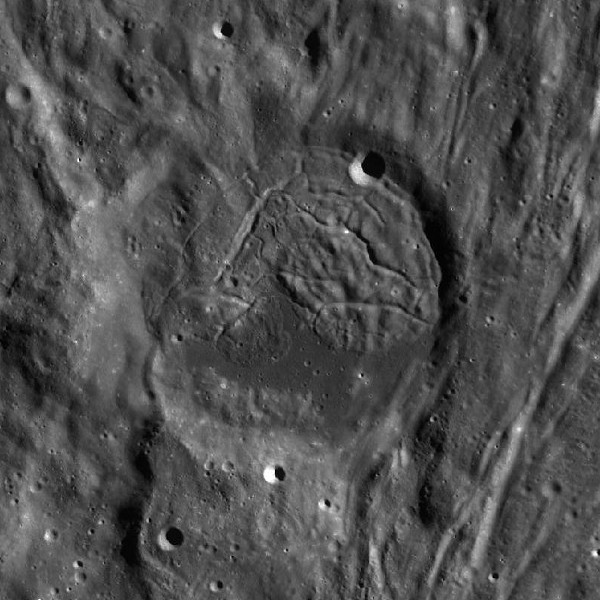
- LRO WAC image
- Coordinates: 44.9°S 105.1°W
- Diameter: 43.31 km (26.91 mi)
- Depth: Unknown
- Colongitude: 106° at sunrise
- Eponym: Gyula Fényi

Fényi is a small lunar crater on the far side of the Moon. This crater lies within the Mendel-Rydberg Basin, a 630 km wide impact basin of Nectarian age. It is located near the southern edge of the huge, braided skirt of ejecta that surrounds the Orientale impact basin to the north. Less than two crater diameters to the southwest is the much larger crater Mendel.

This is a floor-fractured crater that has been filled with mare material. Of the original rim, only a ring-shaped mound of material protrudes upward from the bed of Orientale ejecta. The surrounding terrain shows a radial pattern of grooves and braids running from north to south. There is a small craterlet along the northeast inner wall.

This formation is named after Hungarian astronomer Gyula Fényi (1845-1927). Its designation was formally adopted by the International Astronomical Union in 1970.

== Satellite craters ==
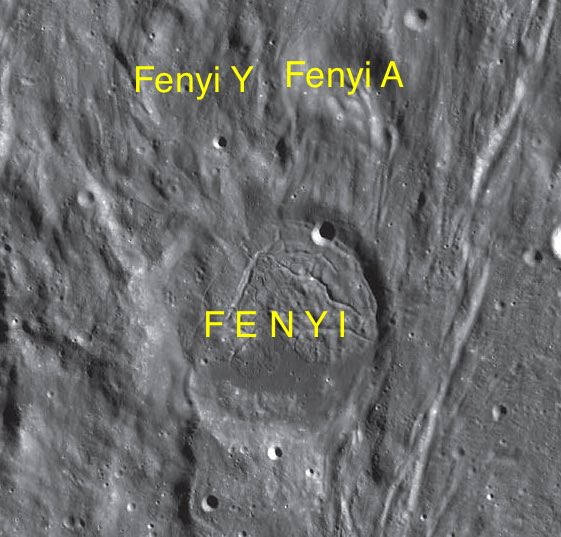
Satellite features of Fényi

By convention these features are identified on lunar maps by placing the letter on the side of the crater midpoint that is closest to Fényi.

| Fényi | Latitude | Longitude | Diameter |
|---|---|---|---|
| A | 43.6° S | 104.4° W | 19 km |
| Y | 43.6° S | 105.5° W | 21 km |
