= Yakovkin (crater) =

Crater on the Moon

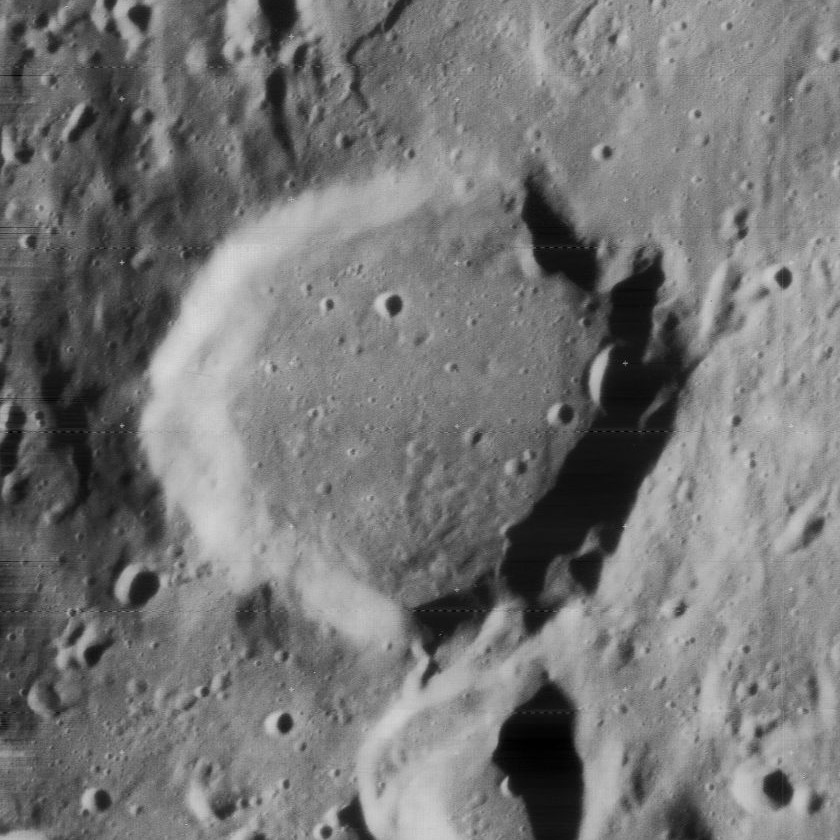
- Lunar Orbiter 4 image
- Coordinates: 54.5°S 78.8°W
- Diameter: 37 km
- Depth: Unknown
- Colongitude: 80° at sunrise
- Eponym: A. A. Yakovkin

Yakovkin is a lunar impact crater that lies very near the southwest limb of the Moon. It is located to the northwest of the crater Pingré, and was designated Pingré H before it was named by the IAU. The proximity of this crater to the limb hinders observation from the Earth, and gives it a foreshortened appearance.

The uneven rim of this crater has a polygonal shape, rather than forming a simple circle. The interior floor has been flooded by lava, leaving a relatively small inner wall. The interior floor is nearly featureless, with only a few tiny craterlets marking the surface. The surrounding terrain appears to have been resurfaced, and is marked only by small or shallow craters. The terrain farther to the northeast is considerably more rough and uneven.

This crater lies within the Mendel-Rydberg Basin, a 630 km wide impact basin of Nectarian age.
