= Pingré (crater) =

Lunar surface depression

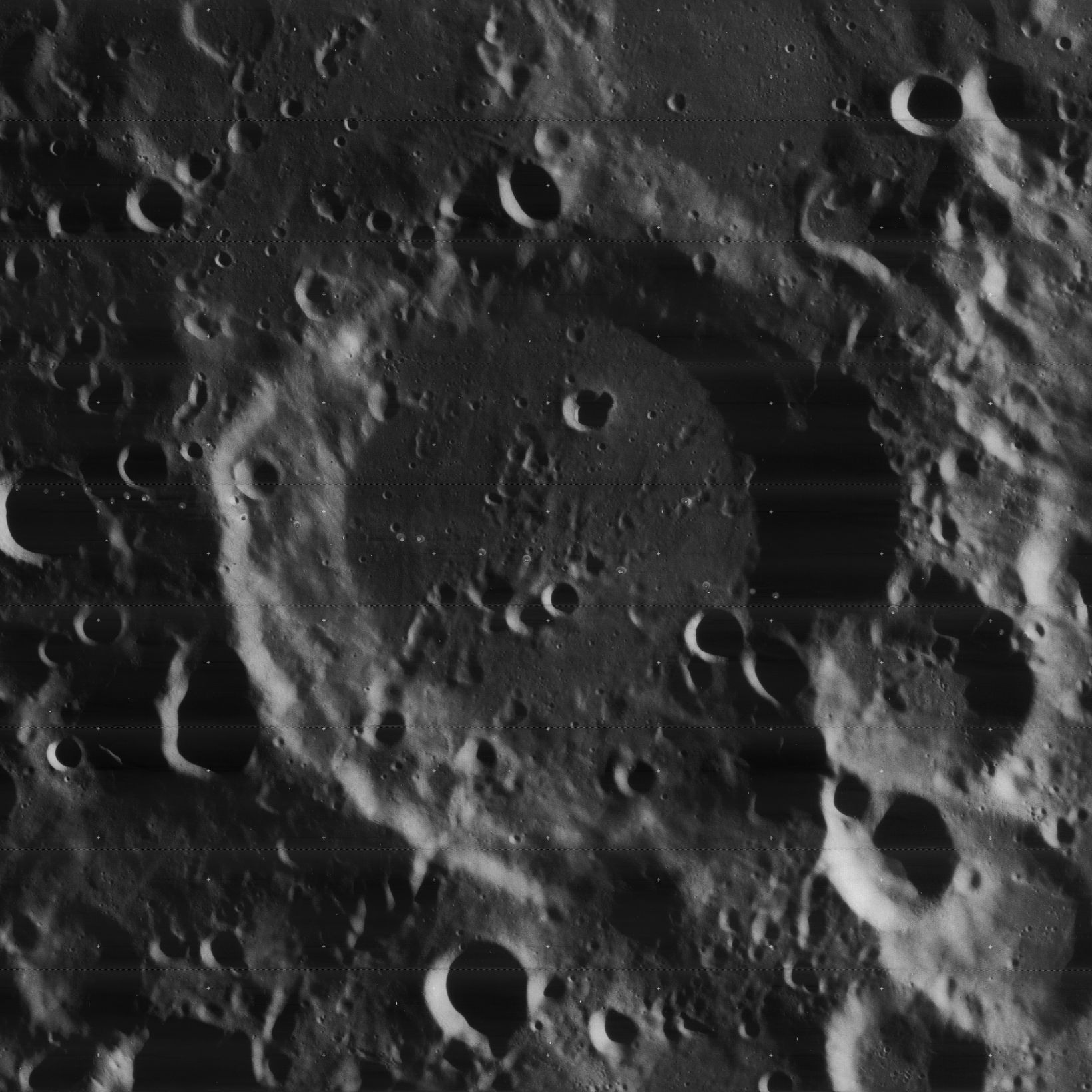
- Lunar Orbiter 4 image
- Coordinates: 58.7°S 73.7°W
- Diameter: 89 km
- Depth: 2.3 km
- Colongitude: 76° at sunrise
- Eponym: Alexandre G. Pingré

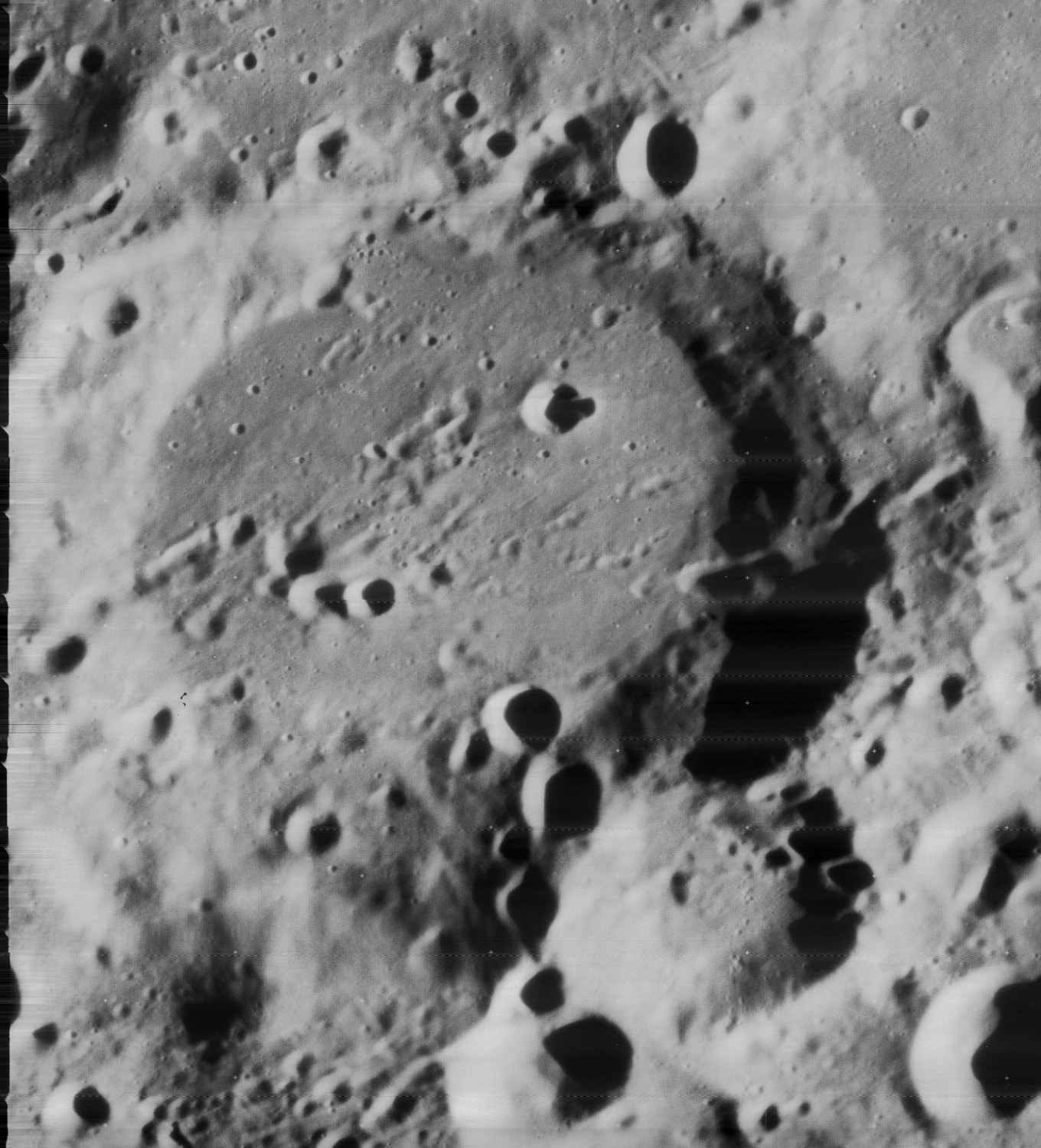
Slightly oblique view also from Lunar Orbiter 4

Pingré is a lunar impact crater that is located near the southwest limb of the Moon, beyond the large crater Phocylides. It lies to the northwest of the huge walled basin Bailly, and to the east of the smaller Graff. Due to its location, this crater appears foreshortened when viewed from the Earth.

The outer rim of this crater has become worn due to minor impacts, leaving the features rounded and irregular. The wall is nearly disintegrated in the southeast, and is overlain by a small crater along the eastern rim. The rim is also low and slumped to the northwest. The interior floor is relatively level, but marked by several small craters, which may be secondaries from Hausen or a more distal crater. These craters occur near the midpoint of the floor where a central peak may once have existed.

Pingré lies to the southeast of the Mendel-Rydberg Basin, a 630 km wide impact basin of Nectarian age.

== Satellite craters ==
By convention these features are identified on lunar maps by placing the letter on the side of the crater midpoint that is closest to Pingré.

Pingré	Latitude	Longitude	Diameter
B	57.6° S	65.3° W	19 km
C	58.4° S	68.3° W	23 km
D	56.6° S	84.1° W	16 km
E	56.5° S	78.9° W	14 km
F	59.9° S	71.0° W	16 km
G	57.9° S	68.9° W	13 km
J	59.1° S	68.8° W	18 km
K	55.2° S	77.7° W	13 km
L	53.8° S	85.8° W	17 km
M	53.5° S	83.6° W	19 km
N	58.1° S	83.7° W	19 km
P	54.0° S	69.5° W	16 km
S	60.3° S	82.0° W	70 km
U	56.3° S	66.0° W	12 km
W	56.4° S	70.9° W	9 km
X	58.9° S	79.3° W	9 km
Y	58.4° S	78.0° W	13 km
Z	55.1° S	82.7° W	12 km

The following craters have been renamed by the IAU.

- Pingré H — See Yakovkin.
