= Chant (crater) =

Crater on the Moon

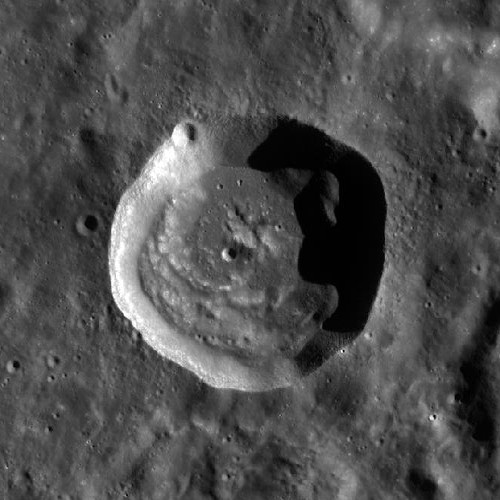
- LRO WAC image
- Coordinates: 40.0°S 109.2°W
- Diameter: 33.60 km (20.88 mi)
- Depth: Unknown
- Colongitude: 110° at sunrise
- Formation: Late Imbrian
- Eponym: Clarence A. Chant

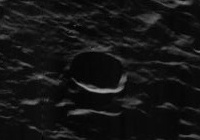
Oblique Lunar Orbiter 5 image, facing west

Chant is a lunar impact crater that is located on the far side of the Moon, behind the southwest limb as seen from the Earth. It lies within the southwestern part of the blanket of ejecta surrounding the Mare Orientale, beyond the Montes Cordillera mountain ring. To the west-northwest is a large formation named Blackett, a walled plain. Southward is the crater Mendel. This crater lies to the northwest of the Mendel-Rydberg Basin, a 630 km wide impact basin of Nectarian age.

On the lunar geologic timescale, this formation dates to the Late Imbrian period. It is a nearly circular crater with a slight outward bulge in the northeast wall. The outer rim is sharp-edged, and the inner sides slope directly downward with only some minor terraces along the east wall. The interior floor is somewhat irregular, particularly in the southern half. There is a small central peak at the midpoint of the floor.

This crater is named after Canadian astronomer and physicist Clarence A. Chant (1865–1956). Its designation was officially adopted by the International Astronomical Union in 1970.
