= Steklov (crater) =

Crater on the Moon

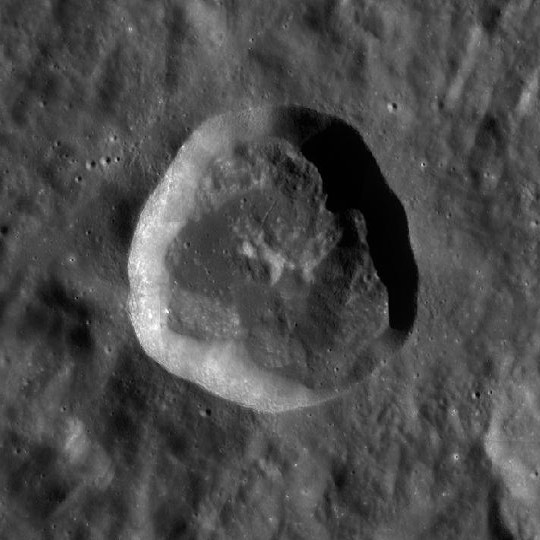
- LRO WAC image
- Coordinates: 36.7°S 104.9°W
- Diameter: 36 km
- Depth: Unknown
- Colongitude: 106° at sunrise
- Eponym: Vladimir A. Steklov

Steklov is a lunar impact crater on the far side of the Moon, past the southwestern limb. It lies in the outer skirt of ejecta from the Mare Orientale impact basin, just to the southwest of the Montes Cordillera ring of mountains. About four crater diameters to the southwest is the slightly smaller crater Chant.

The rim of this crater has a sharp edge that has not been eroded by impacts. The inner walls slope directly downwards to the edge of the irregular interior floor. The perimeter of this crater is roughly circular, but has a slight pear shape. There are no impacts of note within the interior.

This crater lies to the northwest of the Mendel-Rydberg Basin, a 630 km-wide impact basin of Nectarian age.
