= Drude (crater) =

Crater on the Moon

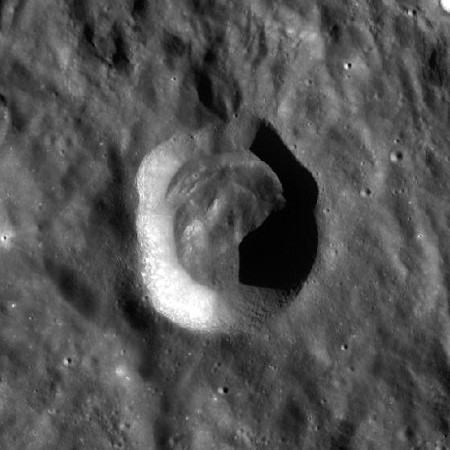
- LRO WAC image
- Coordinates: 38.5°S 91.8°W
- Diameter: 27.13 km (16.86 mi)
- Depth: Unknown
- Colongitude: 92° at sunrise
- Eponym: Paul K. L. Drude

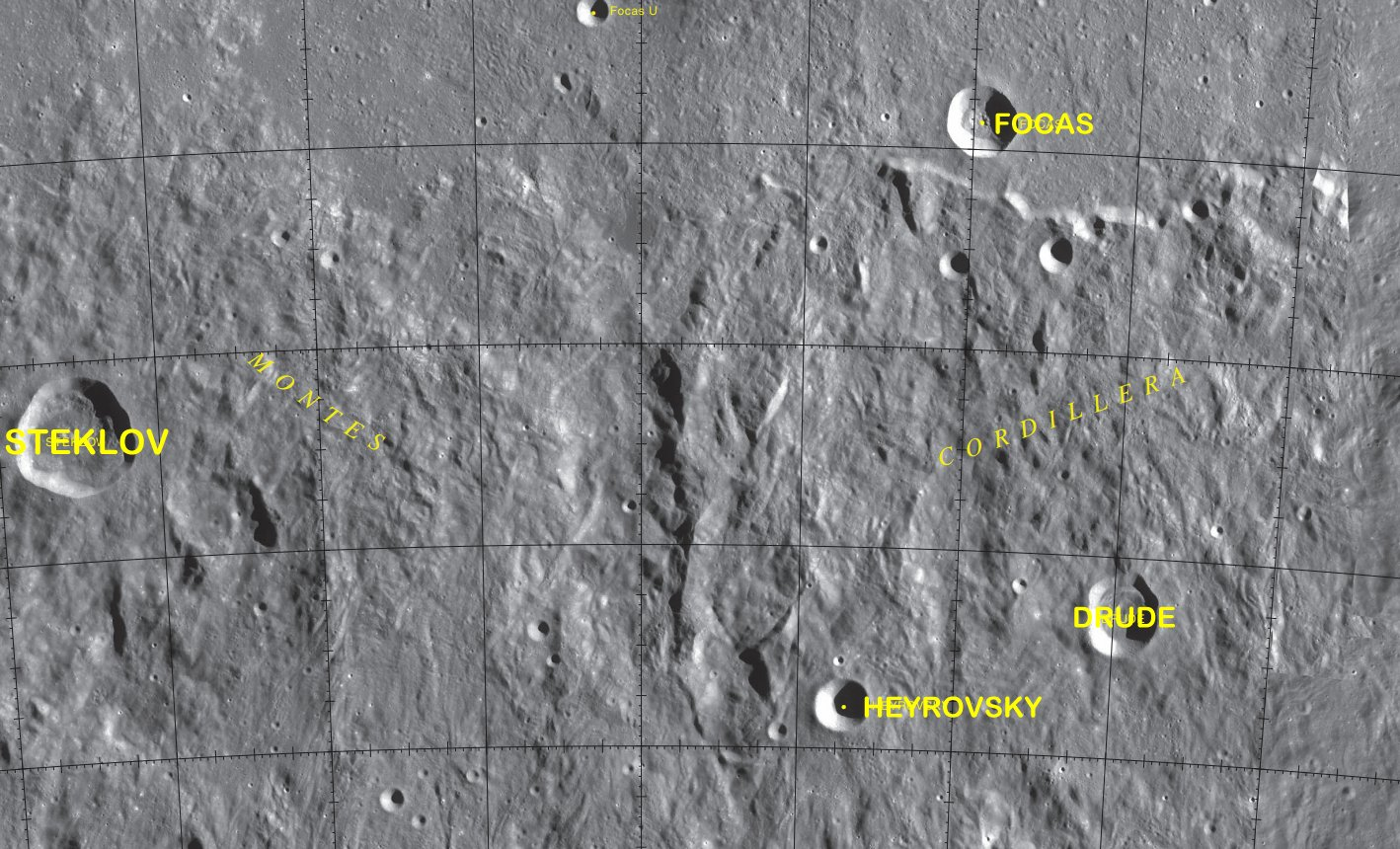
Surroundings of Drude and Heyrovský

Drude is a lunar impact crater that lies on the far side of the Moon, in the rugged Montes Cordillera range that forms the outer ring around the Mare Orientale impact basin. It lies north of the Mendel-Rydberg Basin, a 630 km wide impact basin of Nectarian age. Drude is located just behind the west-southwest limb, and this area is sometimes brought into sight from Earth during favorable librations. However, even at such times, the crater is viewed from the edge and little detail can be seen.

This is a circular crater with a relatively sharp edge, sloping inner walls and a fairly level interior. It has not been significantly eroded, and is generally unremarkable. The nearest craters of note are Graff to the south-southeast and Focas to the north-northwest. The surrounding area is of note for the tumultuous terrain created by the ejecta from Mare Imbrium.

This formation is named after German physicist Paul K. L. Drude (1863–1906). Its designation was officially adopted by the International Astronomical Union in 1970. The satellite crater formerly known as Drude S was renamed Heyrovský by the IAU. It is located to the west southwest of Drude.
