= Petzval (crater) =

Crater on the Moon

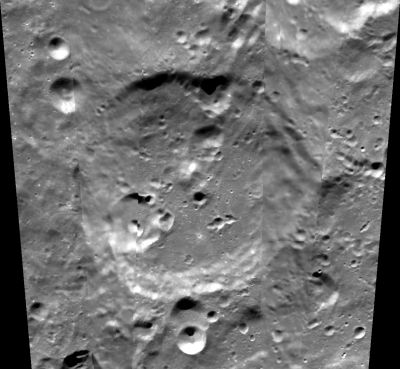
- Clementine image
- Coordinates: 62.7°S 110.4°W
- Diameter: 90 km
- Depth: Unknown
- Colongitude: 113° at sunrise
- Formation: Nectarian
- Eponym: Joseph von Petzval

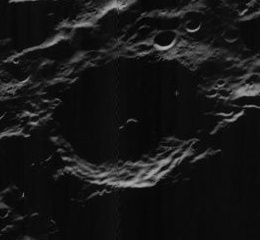
Oblique Lunar Orbiter 5 image, facing west

Petzval is a lunar impact crater that lies in the southern latitudes of the Moon's far side. This crater is located to the south of the larger Lippmann and to the north of Doerfel. It was namer after the Hungarian-German inventor Joseph Petzval.

On the lunar geologic timescale, Petzval dates to the Nectarian period. This is a moderately worn crater formation with features that have become rounded and less well defined due to impact erosion. There are only a few small craterlets along parts of the rim and inner wall. Some faded terrace structures appear along parts of the inner wall to the east and south. Within the interior are small craters in the southwest and northeast sections of the floor. Near the midpoint is a worn central peak.

Petzval lies to the southwest of the Mendel-Rydberg Basin, a 630 km wide impact basin of Nectarian age, and it is on the southeast margin of the Pre-Nectarian South Pole-Aitken Basin.

== Satellite craters ==
By convention, these features are identified on lunar maps by placing the letter on the side of the crater midpoint that is closest to Petzval.

Petzval	Latitude	Longitude	Diameter
C	60.3° S	107.8° W	52 km
D	60.2° S	105.9° W	23 km
