= Andersson (crater) =

Crater on the Moon

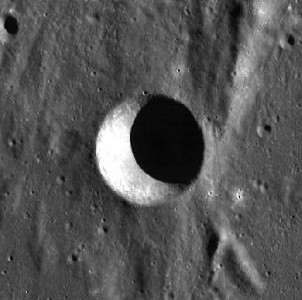
- LRO WAC image
- Coordinates: 49.7°S 95.3°W
- Diameter: 13.42 km (8.34 mi)
- Colongitude: 96° at sunrise
- Eponym: Leif E. Andersson

Andersson is a small lunar impact crater that lies in the southern hemisphere on the far side of the Moon. It is located just beyond the southwestern limb of the visible Moon in a location that can be viewed from the side during a favorable libration. The crater lies near the center of the Mendel-Rydberg Basin, a 630 km wide impact basin of Nectarian age. The nearest crater of note is Guthnick to the north-northeast.

Andersson is bowl-shaped, with a small central floor and no significant erosion of the rim. It lies along a low ridge in the surface that runs to the north. This crater is named after American astronomer Leif E. Andersson (1943-1979). Its designation was formally adopted by the International Astronomical Union in 1985.

== See also ==
- 9223 Leifandersson, asteroid
