= Pilâtre (crater) =

Lunar surface depression

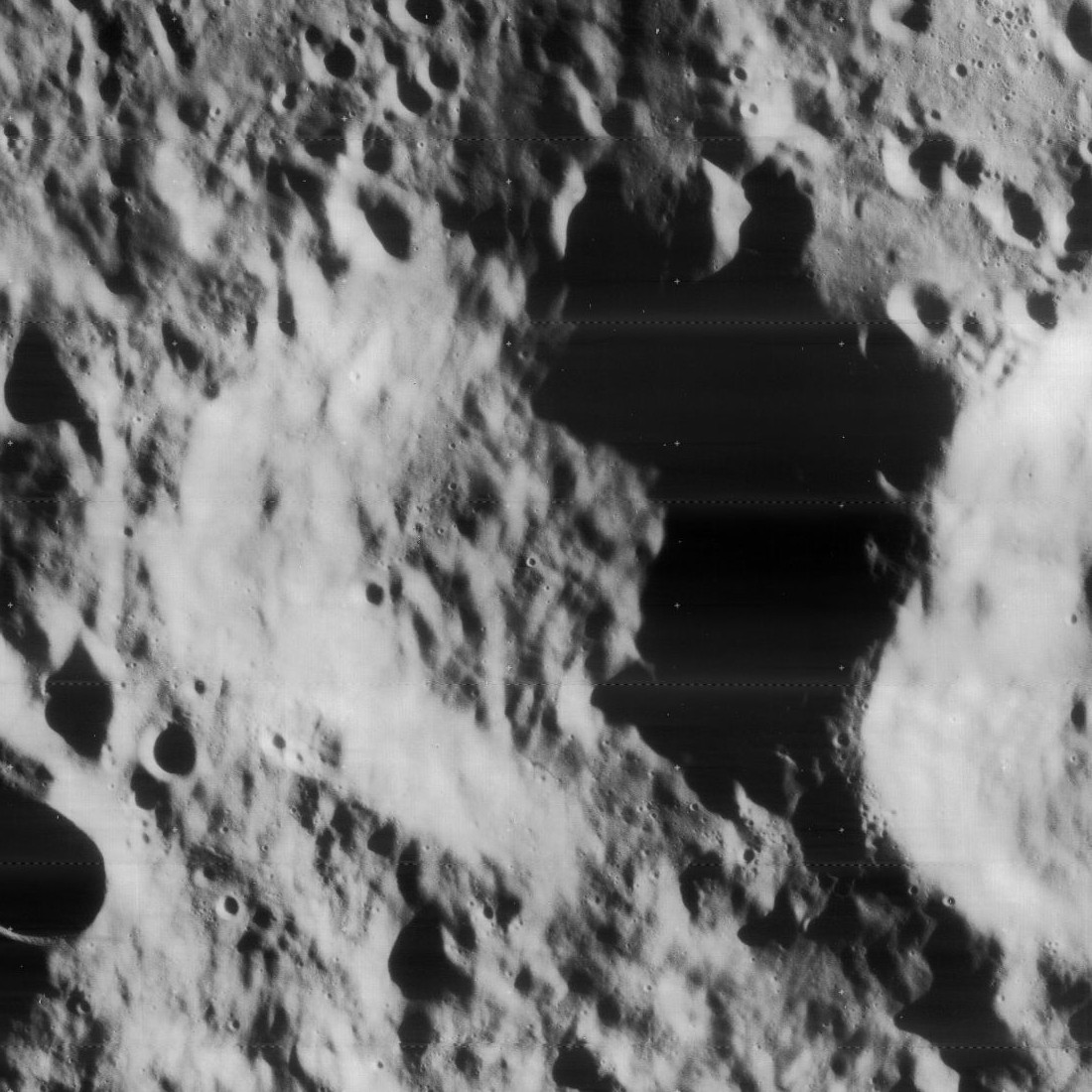
- Lunar Orbiter 4 image
- Coordinates: 60.2°S 86.9°W
- Diameter: 50 km
- Depth: Unknown
- Colongitude: 93° at sunrise
- Eponym: J. F. Pilâtre de Rozier

Pilâtre is a lunar impact crater near the southwestern limb of the Moon. It is located just to the north-northwest of a much larger walled plain named Hausen. The satellite crater Pingré S is attached to the eastern rim, with Pingré itself located farther to the northeast. Just to the west-southwest is Chappe, a formation of similar dimension to Pilâtre.

Due to its location, this crater is viewed almost from the edge from the Earth, limiting the amount of detail that can be observed. This part of the surface is also subject to libration, and the crater can sometimes be completely hidden from view.

The rim of this crater has been heavily worn through impact erosion, leaving an irregular rise that is marked by a number of minor impacts. There is a slight outward bulge in the western part of the rim, and the inner wall is wider in that part of the crater. The interior floor is somewhat irregular, and contains a small craterlet near the southeastern inner wall.

This crater was previously designated Hausen B before being assigned a name by the IAU in 1991.

Pilâtre lies to the south of the Mendel-Rydberg Basin, a 630 km wide impact basin of Nectarian age.
