= Avenir Yakovkin =

Russian astronomer (1887–1974)

Avenir Aleksandrovich Yakovkin (Russian: Авенир Александрович Яковкин; 1887–1974) was a Soviet astronomer.

== Biography ==
Yakovkin was born on 21 May 1887 in Blagoveshchensk, Bashkortostan. He graduated from Kazan University in 1910. From 1928 to 1931 he served as director of the V. P. Engel'gardt Astronomical Observatory near Kazan. He ran the Astronomical Observatory of Kazan University from 1931 to 1937. He held a professorship at Sverdlovsk University between 1937 and 1945, then at Kiev State University between 1945 and 1951. Then he was put in charge of the Main Observatory of the Academy of Sciences of Ukraine, of which he was elected as a corresponding member in May 1951.

His principal field of research was the Moon's rotation and its shape. From 1915 to 1931, a large series of observations were conducted using a heliometer at the Engelhardt Observatory, the processing of which yielded the best values for the constants of the Moon's physical libration. He discovered and investigated the asymmetry of the Moon's visible disk and its dependence on optical libration (the "Yakovkin effect"). He proposed and applied a new method of position angles to study the Moon's libration.

Yakovkin designed several original astronomical instruments and devices. During World War II, he designed a special astronomical sextant for aviation.

The crater Yakovkin on the Moon is named after him.

Yakovkin died on 18 November 1974 in Kyiv.
