= Arrhenius (lunar crater) =

Moon surface depression

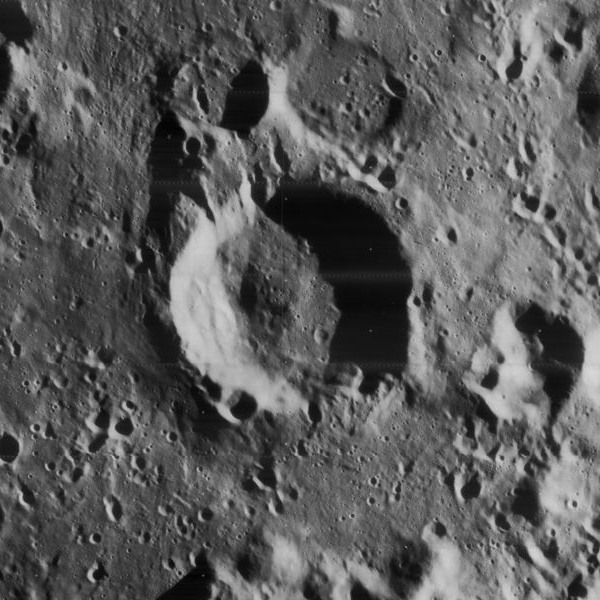
- Lunar Orbiter 4 image
- Coordinates: 55.58°S 91.45°W
- Diameter: 40.93 km (25.43 mi)
- Depth: Unknown
- Colongitude: 269° at sunrise
- Eponym: Svante Arrhenius

Arrhenius is a lunar impact crater that is located just on the far side of the Moon, near the southwest limb. In this location the vicinity of the crater can be viewed during favorable librations, although it is viewed from on edge. This crater lies within the Mendel-Rydberg Basin, a 630 km wide impact basin of Nectarian age. To the south-southeast of Arrhenius is the worn crater Blanchard, and De Roy lies further to the west.

The outer wall of Arrhenius has been somewhat worn and eroded due to a history of minor impacts, leaving the rim rounded and low. There is a notch in the rim to the north-northwest, and an outward bulge along the southeast face. A small craterlet lies across the southwestern rim. The inner floor is relatively flat and free of features of interest. The midpoint lacks a prominent central peak.

This crater was named after Swedish chemist Svante Arrhenius (1859–1927), the 1903 Nobel laureate in chemistry. Its designation was formally adopted by the IAU in 1970.

== Satellite craters ==
By convention these features are identified on lunar maps by placing the letter on the side of the crater midpoint that is closest to Arrhenius.

| Arrhenius | Latitude | Longitude | Diameter |
|---|---|---|---|
| J | 57.6° S | 88.3° W | 18 km |

The following crater has been renamed by the IAU.

- Arrhenius P — See Blanchard (crater).
