= Jean-Baptiste Chappe d'Auteroche =

French astronomer

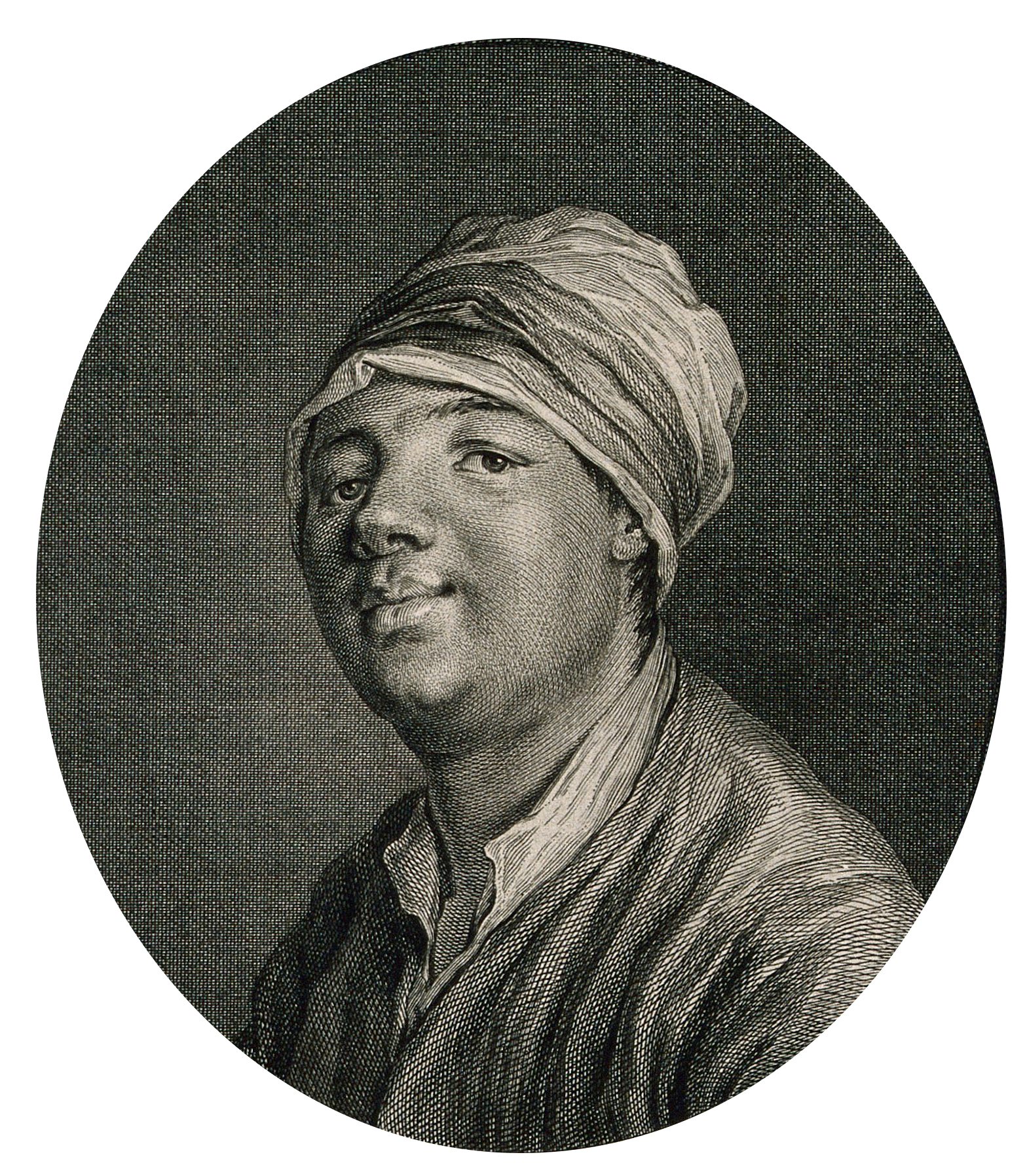
- Jean Chappe d'Auteroche by J. B. Tilliard
- Born: 23 March 1722; Mauriac, Province of Auvergne, France
- Died: 1 August 1769 (aged 47); San José del Cabo, Baja California, Mexico
- Known for: transits of Venus
- Scientific career
- Fields: astronomy
- Workplaces: Royal Academy of Sciences

Jean-Baptiste Chappe d'Auteroche (French pronunciation: [ʒɑ̃ batist ʃap dotʁɔʃ]; 23 March 1722 – 1 August 1769) was a French astronomer, best known for his observations of the transits of Venus in 1761 and 1769.

== Early life ==
Little is known of Chappe's early life. He was born into a distinguished family holding administrative posts and coming from Auvergne, a region of central France. He entered the priesthood, probably as a Jesuit, and devoted himself to the study of astronomy. He was appointed assistant astronomer at the Royal Observatory and admitted to the Royal Academy of Sciences on 14 January 1759.

== Distance from the Earth to the Sun ==
In the mid-18th century, the dynamics of the Solar System were reasonably well understood, but astronomers only had an approximate idea of its scale. If the distance between two planets could be measured, all the other distances would be known from Kepler's laws of planetary motion. The best candidate for an accurate measurement was the distance between the Earth and Venus, which could be calculated from observations of transits of Venus, when Venus passes directly between the Earth and the Sun, appearing as a small black dot moving across the face of the Sun.

However, transits of Venus are very rare. Before 1761, the previous transit had been in 1639; after 1769, the next transit would be in 1874. The importance of the measurement led to an unprecedented international effort to obtain as many observations as possible from different points in the world – points as far apart from one another as possible. Despite the Seven Years' War which was raging throughout most of the world, astronomers were given letters of introduction and safe passage to enable them to reach their observation points and make their observations under the coordination of the various learned societies.

== Transit of Venus 1761 ==
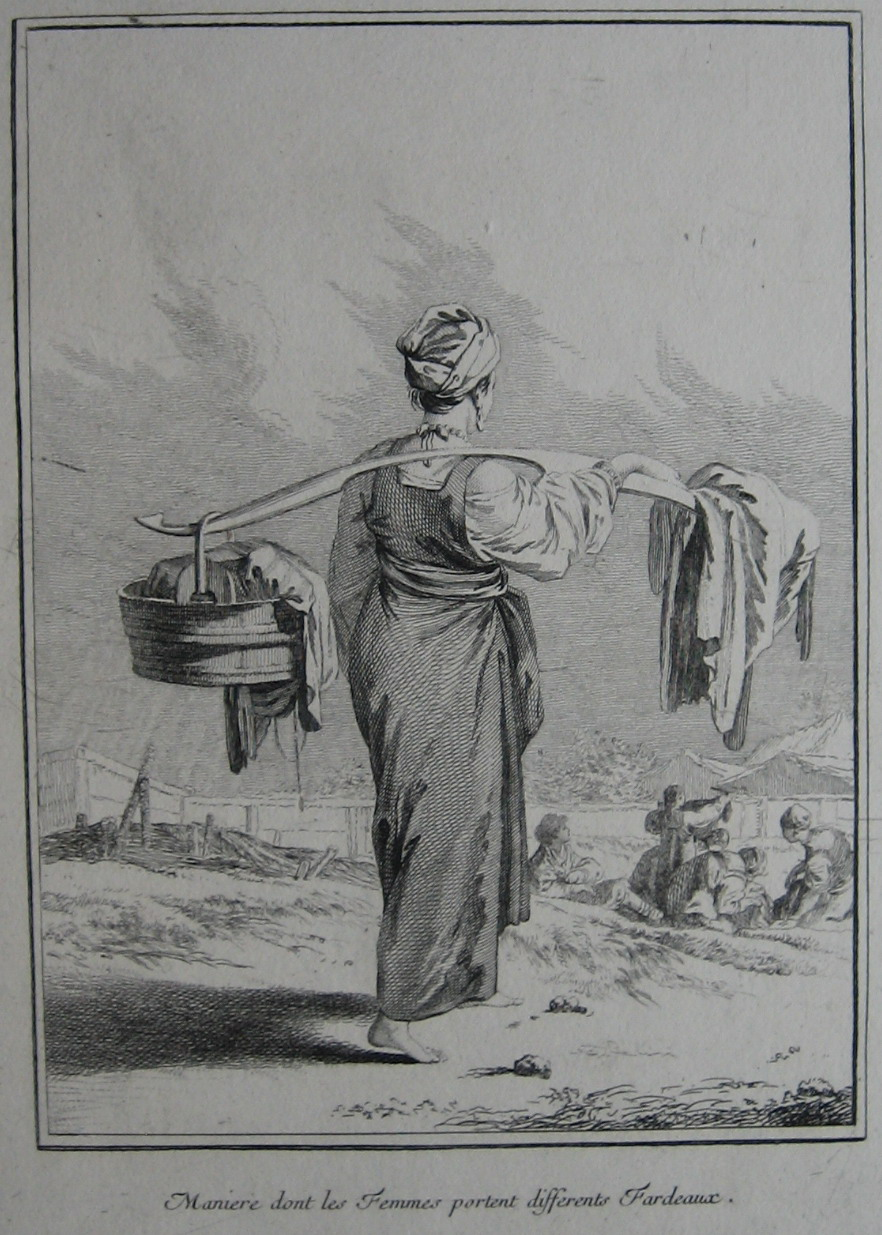
One of the illustrations from Chappe's Voyage en Sibérie, an engraving of a Russian peasant woman by Jean-Baptiste Le Prince.

Chappe was chosen to go to Tobolsk in Siberia to observe the transit of Venus expected for 6 June 1761. The trip was arduous and Chappe arrived in Tobolsk with little time to spare, although he was able to observe the lunar eclipse of 18 May, which enabled him to calculate the longitude of Tobolsk. The spring floods of the Tobol and Irtysh rivers had been particularly severe that year, and some of the local peasants blamed the foreigner with his strange equipment who was "messing with the Sun": Chappe had to be protected by a cordon of armed Cossacks to make his observations. Fortunately, the weather conditions were excellent, and Chappe was able to observe the entire transit. He published his results from Saint Petersburg (Mémoire du passage de Vénus sur le soleil, avec des observations sur l'astronomie et la déclinaison de la boussole faites à Tobolsk, en Sibérie), and didn't return to France until 1763.

Chappe published an account of his travels through Russia (Voyage en Sibérie fait en 1761 (avec la description du Kamtschatka, trad. du russe de Khracheninnikow)) in 1768. The text is hardly a flattering description of the country, and an anonymous pamphlet (Antidote ou Réfutation du mauvais livre superbement imprimé intitulé : Voyage en Sibérie, etc.) was soon circulating whose authorship is often attributed to Catherine the Great herself (although Count Andrey Petrovich Shuvalov is more likely the polemicist).

== Longitude measurement ==
The problem of longitude measurement had been at the heart of astronomical research for a century or more, and marine chronometers were steadily becoming more accurate. Chappe and physicist Henri-Louis Duhamel du Monceau (1700–82) were selected to test one such chronometer, made by Swiss watchmaker Ferdinand Berthoud (1727–1807) on board the corvette L'Hirondelle in 1764.

== Transit of Venus 1769 ==
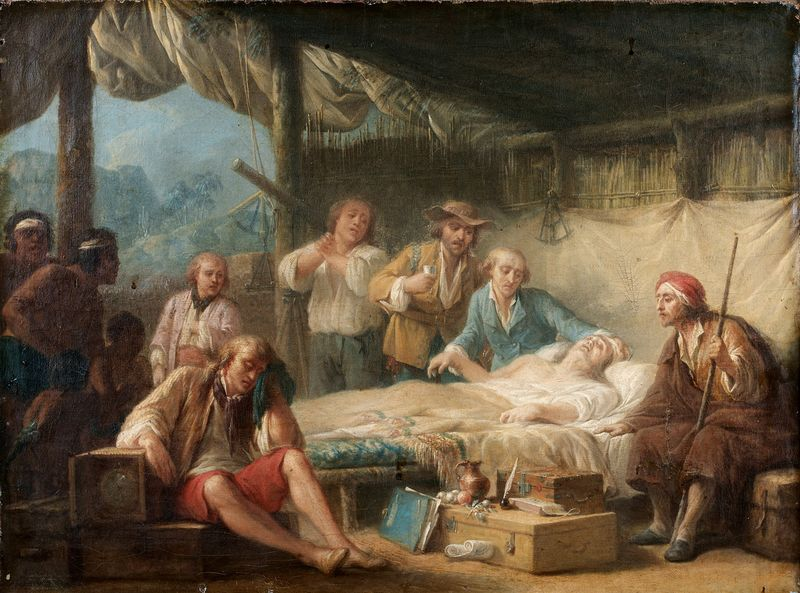
The Death of Jean Chappe

For the transit of Venus on 3 June 1769, Chappe's destination was the Mission of San José del Cabo at the tip of the Baja California peninsula in modern-day Mexico. The journey and observation were uneventful. He had previously (1762–1768) reported observations of a halo/ring around Venus, but during the 1769 transit he reported seeing the black drop effect. However, as the expedition was packing to return, an outbreak of fever (possibly yellow fever) hit the area. Chappe stayed to tend the sick, but was infected and died on 1 August. Only one member of the expedition made it back to Paris alive with Chappe's observations and notes. Chappe's account of his journey (Voyage en Californie, pour l'observation du passage de Vénus sur le disque du soleil) was published posthumously by his colleague César Cassini de Thury. The manuscript is kept at the Library of Paris Observatory and available online.

== Legacy ==
As well as the contributions his observations of the transits of Venus gave to solving the problem of the size of the solar system, his nephew, Claude Chappe was greatly inspired by reading Voyage en Sibérie. Claude went on, with his brothers, to create the first optical telegraph network using semaphores and telescopes.

Asteroid 14961 d'Auteroche, discovered by Eric Walter Elst at La Silla Observatory in Chile in 1996, was named in his honour. The Chappe crater on the Moon was named after him in 1994.
