= Félix de Roy =

Belgian astronomer

Félix de Roy (25 July 1883 – 15 May 1942) was a Belgian astronomer, born in Antwerp. He observed and recorded more than 5,000 variable stars during his career. He was a member of the British Astronomical Association and directed its Variable Star Section between 1922 and 1939. He also occasionally observed meteors for the British Astronomical Association.

The lunar impact crater de Roy was named in his honor.
