= Christian August Hausen =

German mathematician and physicist

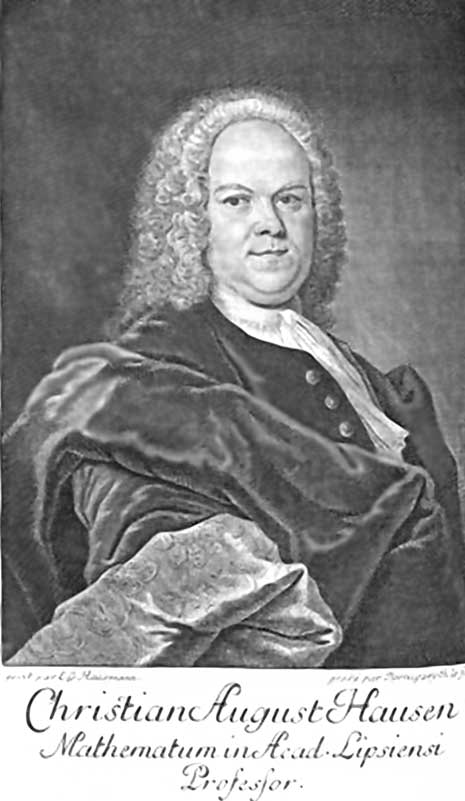
- Picture of Christian August Hausen from a 1737 edition of Acta Eruditorum
- Born: 19 June 1693; Dresden, Electorate of Saxony
- Died: 2 May 1743 (aged 49); Leipzig, Electorate of Saxony
- Education: University of Wittenberg (M.A., 1712)
- Scientific career
- Fields: Mathematics; Physics
- Workplaces: University of Leipzig
- Academic advisors: J. C. Wichmannshausen, Johann Andreas Planer
- Doctoral students: Abraham Gotthelf Kästner

Christian August Hausen (1693–1743) was a German mathematician who is known for his research on electricity.

== Biography ==
Hausen studied mathematics at the University of Wittenberg and received his master's degree in 1712. He became an extraordinary professor of mathematics at the University of Leipzig at the age of 21 and later (1726) became an ordinary professor.

Hausen also researched electrical phenomena, using a triboelectric generator. In the introduction to his book on this subject, Novi profectus in historia electricitatis, published posthumously, Hausen states that he started these experiments shortly before his death. Hausen's generator was similar to earlier generators, such as that of Francis Hauksbee. It consisted of a glass globe rotated by a cord and a large wheel. An assistant rubbed the globe with his hand to produce static electricity. Hausen's book describes his generator and sets forth a theory of electricity in which electrification is a consequence of the production of vortices in a universal electrical fluid.
