= Le Gentil (crater) =

Lunar surface depression

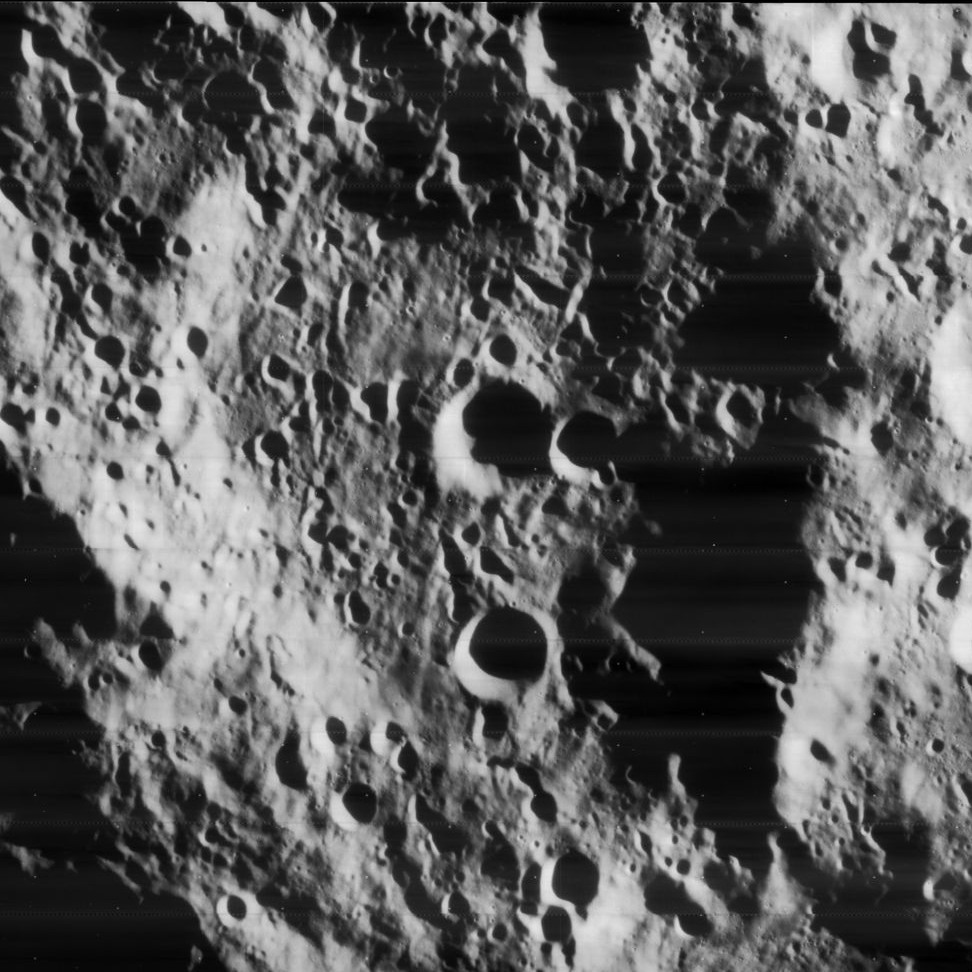
- Lunar Orbiter 4 image
- Coordinates: 74.4°S 76.5°W
- Diameter: 113 km
- Depth: Unknown
- Colongitude: 83° at sunrise
- Eponym: Guillaume H. le Gentil

Le Gentil is a lunar impact crater that is located in the south-southwest part of the Moon, near the limb, and is nearly attached to the southern rim of a huge walled plain called Bailly. To the southeast is the large crater Drygalski. Due to its location, this crater appears considerably foreshortened and is viewed from an oblique angle by observers on the Earth.

As a formation this crater has been deeply eroded by impacts, leaving a heavily worn formation that is little more than a depression in the surface. The rim exists as a circular, rolling ridge with indents and notches where small craters have gouged out the surface. The interior floor is covered in a multitude of tiny craterlets and two small craters: Le Gentil C and Le Gentil B. There is a smaller craterlet attached to the eastern rim of Le Gentil C.

== Satellite craters ==
By convention these features are identified on lunar maps by placing the letter on the side of the crater midpoint that is closest to Le Gentil.

| Le Gentil | Latitude | Longitude | Diameter |
|---|---|---|---|
| A | 74.6° S | 52.4° W | 33 km |
| B | 75.0° S | 73.0° W | 16 km |
| C | 74.4° S | 75.1° W | 19 km |
| D | 74.6° S | 63.8° W | 12 km |
| G | 71.8° S | 58.8° W | 17 km |
