= Leif Erland Andersson =

Swedish astronomer (1943–1979)

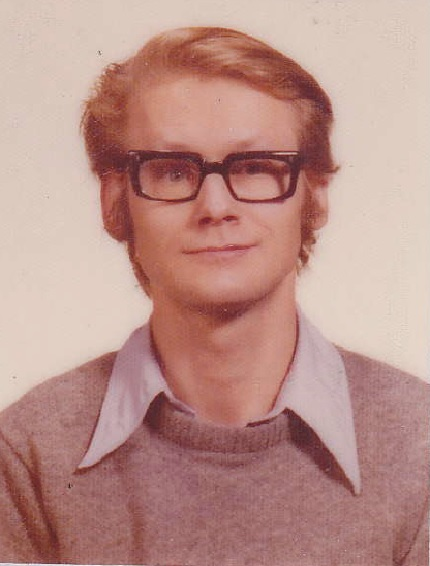
- Born: 4 November 1943; Falkenberg, Halland County, Sweden
- Died: 4 May 1979 (aged 35); Falkenberg, Halland County, Sweden
- Education: Lund University; Indiana University Bloomington (PhD)
- Occupation: Astronomer
- Spouse: Gloria Ptacek

Leif Erland Andersson (4 November 1943 – 4 May 1979) was a Swedish astronomer.

== Early life ==
Andersson had been a child prodigy who won the Swedish television quiz show 10.000-kronorsfrågan ("The 10,000 Kronor Question") at the age of 16.

From his late teen years, he was also a well-known science fiction fan in Sweden, who chaired the MalCon in 1966 in Malmö and took over editing the pioneering Swedish science fiction amateur journal, the Scandinavian Amateur Press Alliance (SAPA) after John-Henri Holmberg left the position some time after 1964.

== Professional career ==
Andersson studied astronomy at Lund University, but received a scholarship to San Michele Observatory in on the island of Anacapri in Sicily in 1968.

He studied the work of Professor Åke Wallenquist, at Uppsala University. Andersson later went to Indiana University Bloomington to complete his PhD degree. While there, he married Gloria Ptacek in 1973 at the Beck Chapel of Indiana University.

Andersson was hired in a post-doctoral research associate position in the summer of 1973 by Dr. Gerard Kuiper at the Lunar & Planetary Laboratory of the University of Arizona in Tucson, Arizona. Andersson calculated the first observable transits of Pluto and Charon (that took place in the early 1980s) but did not live to see them.

He mapped the far side of the Moon in NASA's Catalogue of Lunar Nomenclature, with co-author Ewen Whitaker, published in 1982.

== Death ==
Leif Andersson died from lymphatic cancer at the age of 35 on 4 May 1979. He was survived by his wife, Gloria Lee Andersson (née Ptacek).

== Honors ==
The crater Andersson on the Moon was named in his memory.

In honor of Leif Andersson's work on the determination of Pluto's pole position, the Spacewatch Asteroid Project at the University of Arizona's Lunar and Planetary Laboratory named the asteroid 9223 Leifandersson on 24 January 2000 (M.P.C. 38198).

The University of Arizona's Lunar and Planetary Laboratory Leif Erland Andersson Award for Service and Outreach is awarded annually to a Planetary Science graduate student in recognition for attention to broader impacts and involvement in activities outside of academic responsibilities that benefit the department, university, and the larger community.
