= Lippmann (crater) =

Crater on the Moon

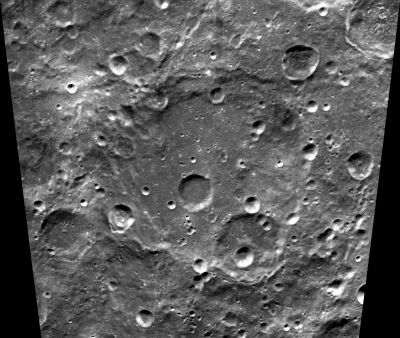
- Clementine image
- Coordinates: 56.0°S 114.9°W
- Diameter: 160 km
- Depth: Unknown
- Colongitude: 119° at sunrise
- Formation: Pre-Nectarian
- Eponym: Gabriel Lippmann

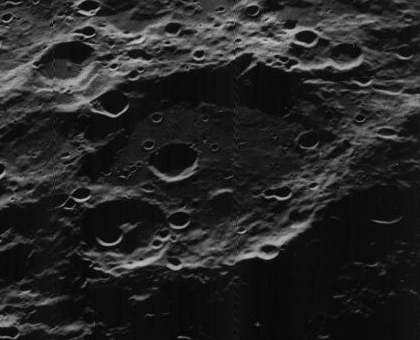
Oblique Lunar Orbiter 5 image, facing west

Lippmann is a large lunar impact crater in the southern part of the far side of the Moon and so cannot be viewed directly from the Earth. Just to the northeast is the walled plain designated Mendel, only slightly smaller than Lippmann. To the south-southeast lies the crater Petzval.

Lippmann is named after Gabriel Lippmann (1845–1921), a Nobel laureate in physics.

On the lunar geologic timescale, Lippmann dates to the Pre-Nectarian period. As with many lunar formations of this size, Lippmann has been eroded by subsequent impacts. The southeastern part of the rim has been overlain by the satellite crater Lippmann L, which in turn has become worn and eroded. The relatively fresh crater Lippmann Q lies across the southwest rim. The remaining rim has become worn and rounded, with a few surviving terrace-like features and the rim edge having lost their definition. The western and eastern sides of the crater in particular are nearly overlain by ejecta material.

The interior floor is relatively level, at least in the western two-thirds, but is marked by several impacts. The most notable of these is Lippmann P, located just to the southwest of the midpoint. A short chain of small craterlets lies along the southern part of the floor. The remainder is marked by a few small craterlets and pitted by tiny craters.

The terrain to the north and east of this crater are streaked with features that are radial to the huge Mare Orientale impact basin to the northeast. Also, Lippmann lies to the southwest of the Mendel-Rydberg Basin, a 630 km wide impact basin of Nectarian age (older than Orientale), and it is on the southeast margin of the Pre-Nectarian South Pole-Aitken Basin.

== Satellite craters ==
By convention these features are identified on lunar maps by placing the letter on the side of the crater midpoint that is closest to Lippmann.

| Lippmann | Latitude | Longitude | Diameter |
|---|---|---|---|
| B | 52.6° S | 110.9° W | 29 km |
| E | 55.4° S | 107.6° W | 23 km |
| J | 59.0° S | 106.6° W | 19 km |
| L | 57.6° S | 112.5° W | 54 km |
| P | 56.1° S | 115.0° W | 29 km |
| Q | 57.0° S | 118.7° W | 27 km |
| R | 57.2° S | 121.3° W | 37 km |
