= Johann Christoph Wichmannshausen =

German philosopher and philologist

Johann Wichmannshausen
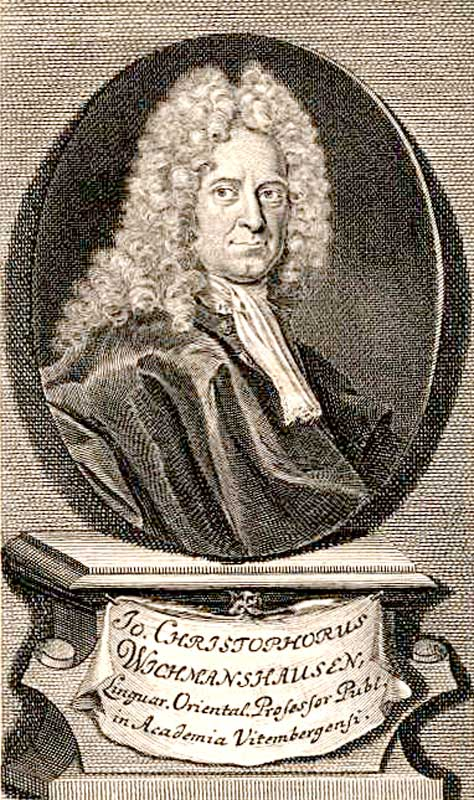
- Born: October 3, 1663; Ilsenburg
- Died: January 17, 1727 (aged 63); Wittenberg
- Education: University of Leipzig (M.A., 1685)
- Scientific career
- Fields: Philology, philosophy
- Workplaces: University of Wittenberg
- Thesis: Disputationem Moralem de Divortiis Secundum Jus Naturae (Moral Disputation on Divorce according to the Law of Nature) (1685)
- Academic advisors: Otto Mencke
- Notable students: Christian August Hausen

Johann Christoph Wichmannshausen (October 3, 1663 – January 17, 1727) was a 17th-century German philologist.

== Biography ==
He received his master's degree from the University of Leipzig in 1685. His dissertation, titled Disputationem Moralem de Divortiis Secundum Jus Naturae (Moral Disputation on Divorce according to the Law of Nature), was written under the direction of his father in law and advisor Otto Mencke. He was from 1692 until the time of his death a professor of Near Eastern languages and university librarian at the University of Wittenberg, and gave courses there in Philosophy and Hebrew.

Among the books he published are De extinctione ordinis Templariorum (The extinction of the Templars), 1687 and many short works on aspects of the Old Testament.

Today, Wichmannshausen is best known as part of a line of scientific genealogy stretching from Mencke to Gauss and to many other mathematicians. As of 2015, the Mathematics Genealogy Project lists 88523 of his academic descendants.
