= Rydberg (crater) =

Crater on the Moon

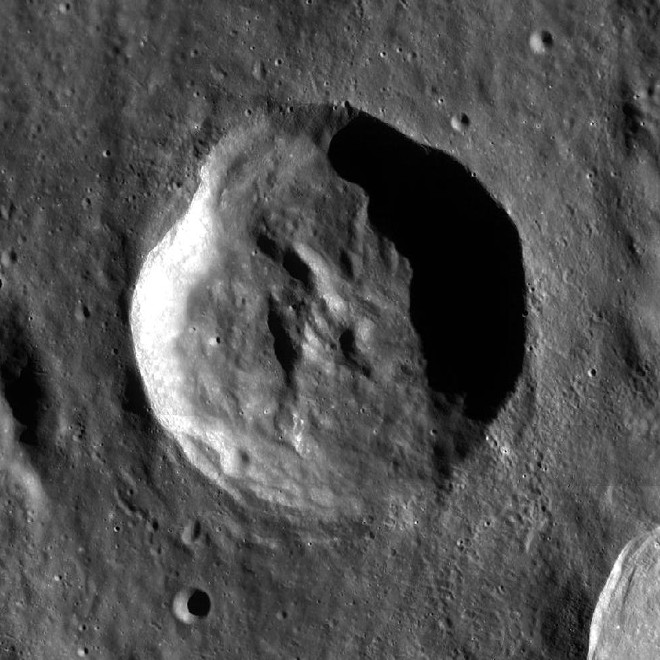
- LRO WAC image
- Coordinates: 46.5°S 96.3°W
- Diameter: 49 km
- Depth: Unknown
- Colongitude: 97° at sunrise
- Eponym: Johannes Rydberg

Rydberg is a lunar impact crater that is located on the far side of the Moon, just past the southwest limb. This crater lies within the Mendel-Rydberg Basin, a 630 km wide impact basin of Nectarian age. It is located due south of the Mare Orientale, in the outer skirt of ejecta that surrounds the Orientale impact feature. Just to the southeast is the crater Guthnick.

This formation dates to the Eratosthenian epoch of the lunar geologic timescale. It is a little-eroded crater formation with a relatively sharp edge. The inner walls do not have much terracing, although slumped piles of talus lie along the base. The infrared spectrum of pure crystalline plagioclase has been identified on the northwest wall. At the midpoint of the interior is a central ridge, with a low spur that runs halfway toward the southern inner wall.

This feature was named after the Swedish physicist Johannes Rydberg.
