= Paul Drude =

German physicist (1863–1906)

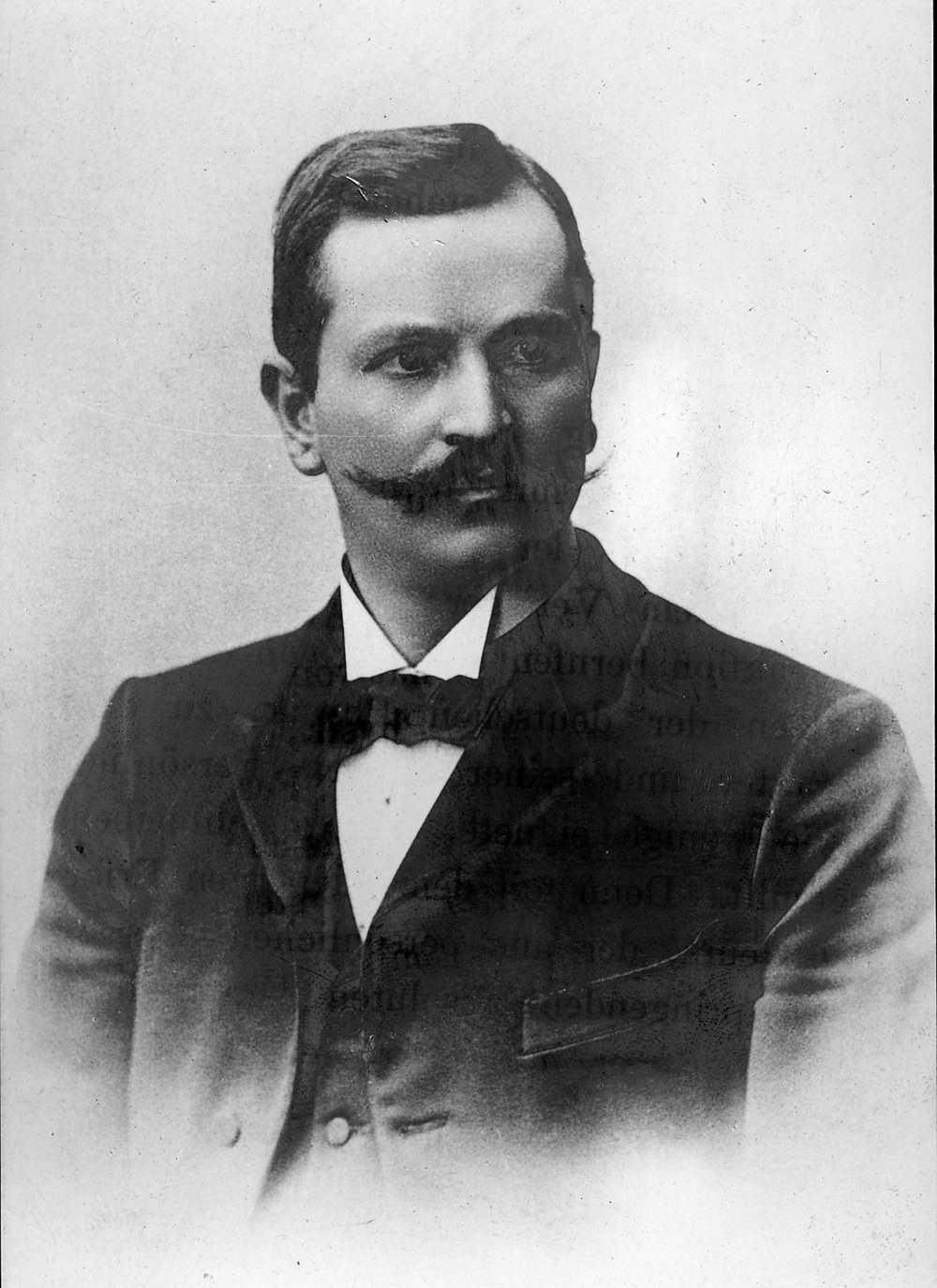
- Born: Paul Karl Ludwig Drude; 12 July 1863; Braunschweig, Duchy of Brunswick
- Died: 5 July 1906 (aged 42); Berlin, German Empire
- Education: University of Göttingen (Dr. phil.)
- Known for: Ellipsometry; Drude model Drude helix model
- Spouse: Emilie Regelsberger (m. 1894)
- Children: 4
- Scientific career
- Fields: Electromagnetism; optics
- Workplaces: University of Leipzig (1894–1901); University of Giessen (1901–05); University of Berlin (1905–06)
- Thesis: Über die Gesetze der Reflexion und Brechung des Lichtes an der Grenze absorbierende Kristalle (1887)
- Doctoral advisor: Woldemar Voigt
- Notable students: James Franck

Paul Karl Ludwig Drude (/druːd/ drood; German: [ˈdʁuːdə]; 12 July 1863 – 5 July 1906) was a German physicist specializing in optics. He is known for the Drude model.

== Biography ==
=== Education ===
Paul Karl Ludwig Drude was born on 12 July 1863 in Braunschweig. He began his studies in mathematics at the University of Göttingen, but later changed his major to physics. In 1887, he received his Ph.D. under Woldemar Voigt with a thesis on the reflection and diffraction of light in crystals.

Drude graduated the year Heinrich Hertz began publishing his findings from his experiments on the electromagnetic theories of James Clerk Maxwell, thus Drude began his career at the time Maxwell's theories were being introduced into Germany.

=== Career and research ===
In 1894, Drude became professor extraordinarius at the University of Leipzig. The same year, he married Emilie Regelsberger, with whom he had 4 children.

His first experiments were the determination of the optical constants of various solids, measured to unprecedented levels of accuracy. He then worked to derive relationships between the optical and electrical constants and the physical structure of substances. In 1894, he was responsible for introducing the symbol c for the speed of light in a perfect vacuum.

Toward the end of his tenure at Leipzig, Drude was invited to write a textbook on optics, which he accepted. The book, Lehrbuch der Optik, published in 1900, brought together the formerly distinct subjects of electricity and optics, which was cited by Drude as an "epoch-making advance in natural science".

In 1900, Drude became the editor of Annalen der Physik, the most respected physics journal at that time. The same year, he developed a powerful model to explain the thermal, electrical, and optical properties of matter; this is known as the Drude model. In 1901, he was appointed Professor Ordinarius of Physics at the University of Giessen.

In 1905, Drude became Director of the Physics Institute at the University of Berlin. In 1906, at the height of his career, he became a Member of the Prussian Academy of Sciences. A few days after his inauguration lecture, for inexplicable reasons, he committed suicide. He was survived by his wife and children.

== Honors ==
- Drude crater on the Moon is named after him.
- The Paul Drude Institute, in Berlin, was established in his honor.

== Books ==
- Lehrbuch der Optik, Leipzig, 1906.

== See also ==
- Physical crystallography before X-rays
