= 9223 Leifandersson =

Asteroid

Discovery
- Discovered by: Spacewatch
- Discovery site: Kitt Peak National Obs.
- Discovery date: 18 December 1995

Designations
- Named after: Leif Erland Andersson (Swedish astronomer)
- Alternative designations: 1995 YY_{7} · 1949 QK_{1} 1981 UD_{5} · 1988 VT_{10} 1990 FD_{4} · 1991 RK
- Minor planet category: main-belt · Flora background

Orbital characteristics
- Epoch 4 September 2017 (JD 2458000.5)
- Uncertainty parameter 0
- Observation arc: 67.50 yr (24,655 days)
- Aphelion: 2.4626 AU
- Perihelion: 2.1386 AU
- Semi-major axis: 2.3006 AU
- Eccentricity: 0.0704
- Orbital period (sidereal): 3.49 yr (1,275 days)
- Mean anomaly: 245.38°
- Mean motion: 0° 16^{m} 57^{s} / day
- Inclination: 3.4120°
- Longitude of ascending node: 231.82°
- Argument of perihelion: 23.837°

Physical characteristics
- Dimensions: 4.498±0.176 km 4.64 km (calculated)
- Synodic rotation period: 3.758±0.0014 h
- Geometric albedo: 0.24 (assumed); 0.381±0.051; 0.3810±0.0513
- Spectral type: S (assumed)
- Absolute magnitude (H): 13.384±0.003 (R) · 13.4 · 13.6 · 13.83

9223 Leifandersson, provisional designation 1995 YY_{7}, is a background asteroid from the inner regions of the asteroid belt, approximately 4.5 kilometers in diameter. It was discovered on 18 December 1995, by astronomers of the Spacewatch program at Kitt Peak National Observatory in Arizona, United States. The asteroid was named in memory of Swedish astronomer Leif Erland Andersson. The assumed stony asteroid has a rotation period of 3.758 hours.

== Orbit and classification ==
Leifandersson is a non-family asteroid of the main belt's background population when applying the Hierarchical Clustering Method to its proper orbital elements. It has also been classified as a member of the Flora family (402), a giant asteroid family and the largest family of stony asteroids in the main-belt. It orbits the Sun in the inner asteroid belt at a distance of 2.1–2.5 AU once every 3 years and 6 months (1,275 days; semi-major axis of 2.30 AU). Its orbit has an eccentricity of 0.07 and an inclination of 3° with respect to the ecliptic.

The body's observation arc begins with its first observation as 1949 QK_{1} at Goethe Link Observatory in August 1948, or more than 47 years prior to its official discovery observation at Kitt Peak.

== Physical characteristics ==
Leifandersson is an assumed stony S-type asteroid.

=== Rotation period ===
In February 2011, a rotational lightcurve of Leifandersson was obtained from photometric observations by astronomers at the Palomar Transient Factory in California. Lightcurve analysis gave a rotation period of 3.758 hours with a brightness amplitude of 0.33 magnitude (U=2).

=== Diameter and albedo ===
According to the survey carried out by the NEOWISE mission of NASA's Wide-field Infrared Survey Explorer, Leifandersson measures 4.498 kilometers in diameter and its surface has an albedo of 0.3810. The Collaborative Asteroid Lightcurve Link assumes an albedo of 0.24 – derived from 8 Flora, the parent body of the Flora family – and calculates a diameter of 4.64 kilometers based on an absolute magnitude of 13.83.

== Naming ==
This minor planet was named after Swedish astronomer Leif Erland Andersson (1943–1979), who calculated the first observable transits of Pluto and Charon and also co-produced a catalogue of lunar craters. The approved naming citation was published by the Minor Planet Center on 24 January 2000 (M.P.C. 38198). The lunar crater Andersson was also named in his memory.
