= Otto Mencke =

German philosopher and scientist (1644–1707)

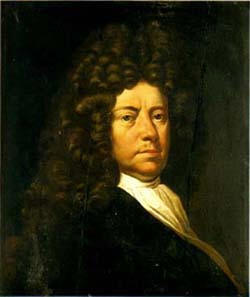
- Otto Mencke
- Born: 22 March 1644; Oldenburg, County of Oldenburg
- Died: 18 January 1707 (aged 62); Leipzig, Electorate of Saxony
- Education: University of Leipzig (B.A., 1662; M.A. 1664; Ph.D., Aug. 1666)
- Known for: Founding the Acta Eruditorum journal
- Scientific career
- Fields: Philosopher and mathematician
- Workplaces: University of Leipzig
- Thesis: Ex Theologia naturali – De Absoluta Dei Simplicitate, Micropolitiam, id est Rempublicam In Microcosmo Conspicuam (Aug. 1666)
- Doctoral advisor: Jakob Thomasius
- Doctoral students: J. C. Wichmannshausen; Christian Wolff

Notes
- He is the father of Johann Burchard Mencke.

Otto Mencke (/ˈmɛŋkə/; German: [ˈmɛŋkə]; 22 March 1644 – 18 January 1707) was a German philosopher and scientist.

== Work ==
Mencke obtained his doctorate at the University of Leipzig in August 1666 with a thesis entitled: Ex Theologia naturali – De Absoluta Dei Simplicitate, Micropolitiam, id est Rempublicam In Microcosmo Conspicuam.

He is notable as being the founder of the very first scientific journal in Germany, established 1682, entitled Acta Eruditorum. He was a professor of moral philosophy at the University of Leipzig, but is more famous for his scientific genealogy that produced a fine lineage of mathematicians that includes notables such as Carl Friedrich Gauss and David Hilbert.

Isaac Newton and Mencke were in correspondence in 1693.

== Legacy ==
The Mathematics Genealogy Project database records more than 102,000 (as of January 2018) mathematicians and other scientists in his lineage. The Philosophy Family Tree records 535 philosophers in his lineage as of May 2010.
