= List of fellows of the Royal Society elected in 1965 =

This article lists fellows of the Royal Society elected in 1965.

== Fellows ==
1. Robert Edward Bell
2. George Douglas Hutton Bell
3. Sydney Brenner
4. Giles Brindley
5. Bertram Brockhouse
6. Arthur Roderick Collar
7. Sir Edward Collingwood
8. Robin Coombs
9. Kenneth Denbigh
10. Gordon Elliott Fogg
11. Charles Edmund Ford
12. Roderic Alfred Gregory
13. Dorothy Hill
14. Alan Woodworth Johnson
15. Reginald Victor Jones
16. Charles Kemball
17. J. S. Kennedy
18. Tom Kilburn
19. Sir Hans Kornberg
20. Hans Kronberger
21. Charles Philippe Leblond
22. Panchanan Maheshwari
23. Sir John Mason
24. William Valentine Mayneord
25. Sir Robert Menzies
26. Sir Gilbert Roberts
27. Keith Runcorn
28. Philip Sheppard
29. Keith Stewartson
30. John Thoday
31. John Clive Ward
32. Gerald B. Whitham
33. Sir Geoffrey Wilkinson

== Foreign Members ==
1. Theodosius Dobzhansky
2. Richard Feynman
3. Jaroslav Heyrovsky
4. Severo Ochoa
