= Gyula Fényi =

Fényi Gyula (8 January 1845 – 21 December 1927) was a Hungarian Jesuit and astronomer. He is also known by the name P. Julius Fenyi SJ. He is best known for his work on the Sun and leading the Haynald Observatory to be a leader in solar studies.

== Life ==
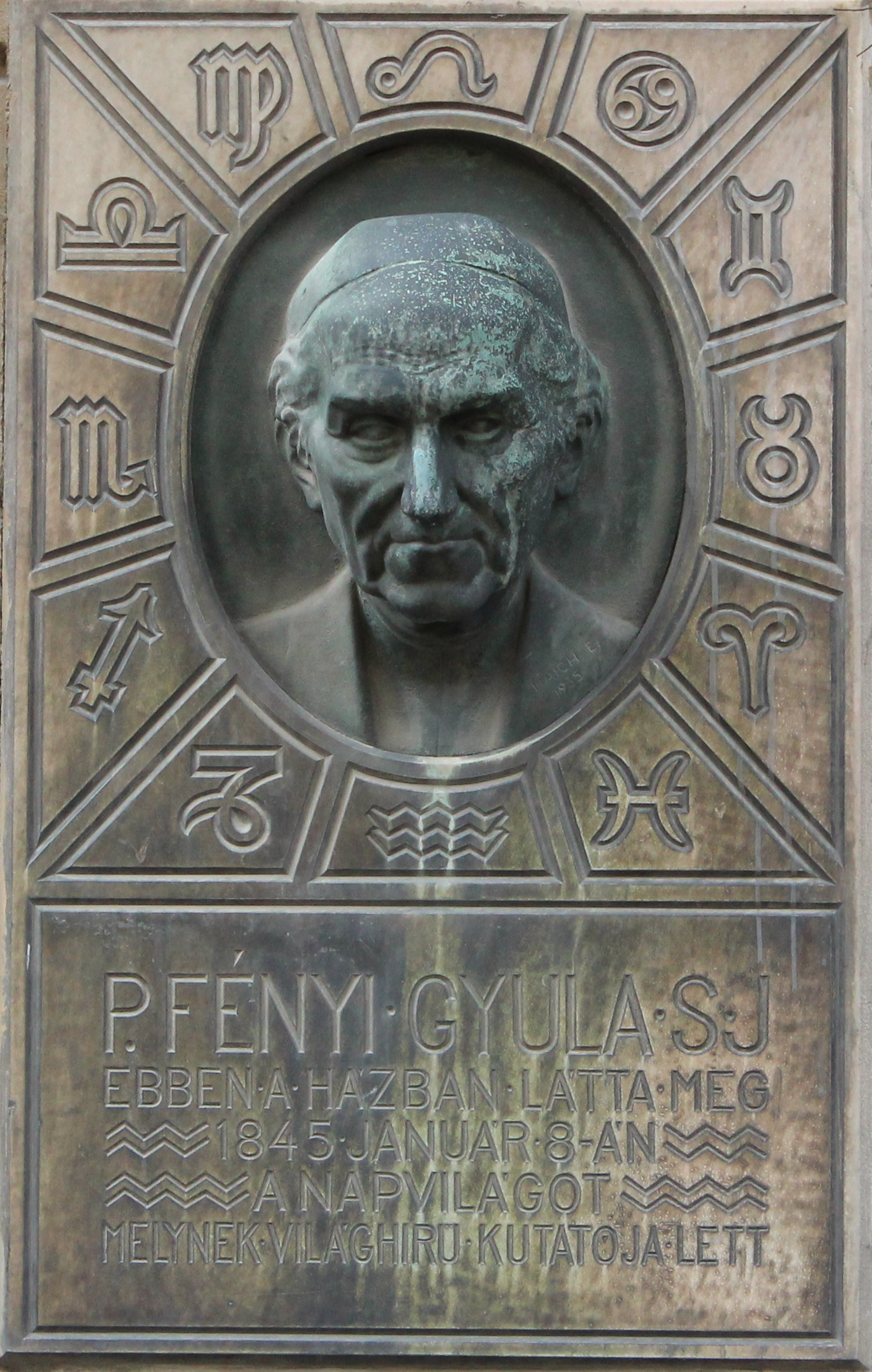
Commemorative plaque on birthplace (Sopron, Hungary)

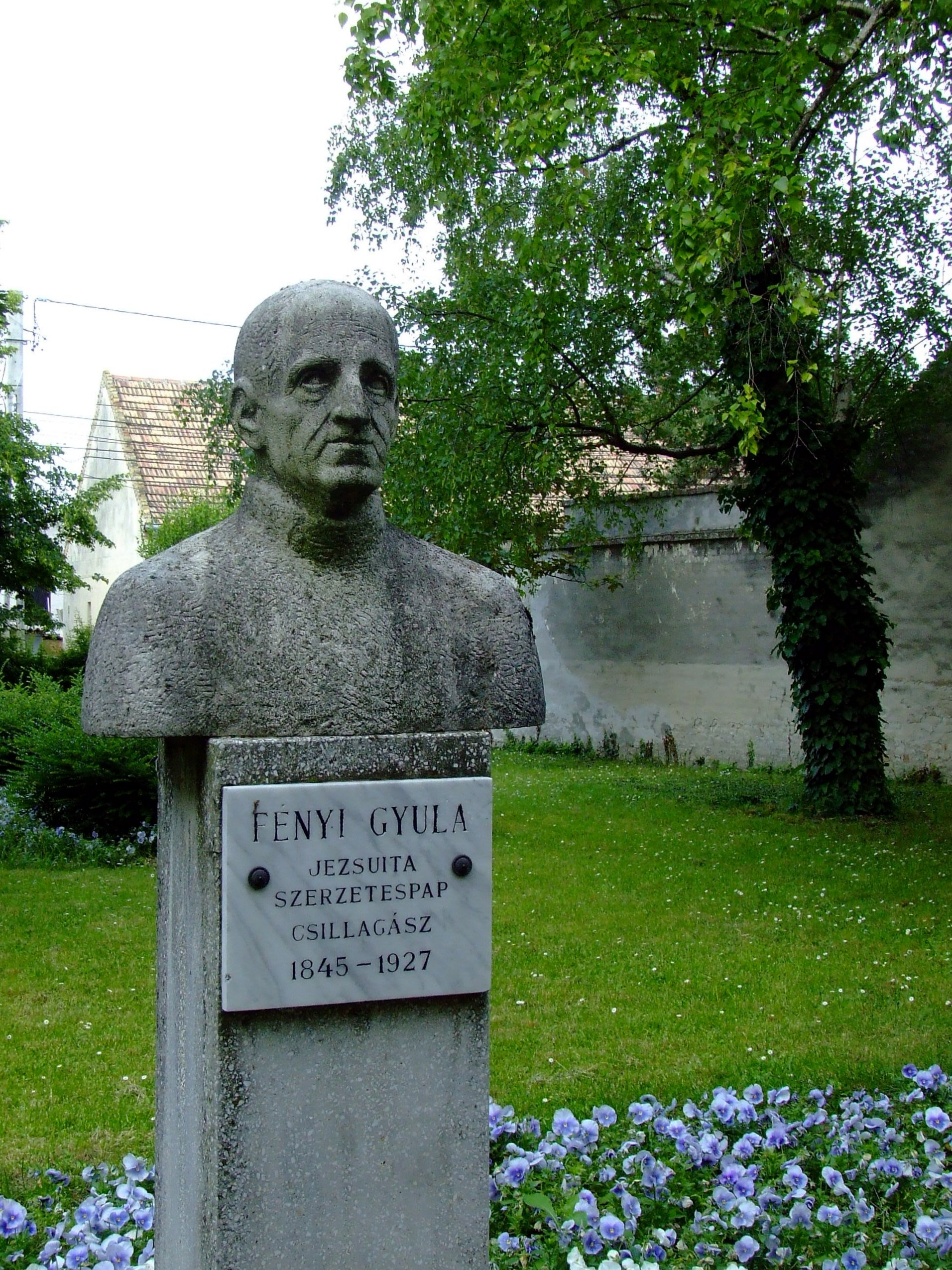
Monument to Gyula Fényi (Kalocsa, Hungary).

He was born in Sopron, Hungary, the eleventh child of a merchant family. In 1864 he became a member of the Society of Jesus, and he was sent to Kalocsa where he would be an instructor of chemistry, mathematics, physics and the natural history of the world. He studied at the university at Innsbruck beginning in 1874, where he trained in theology, mathematics and physics. After completing his studies in 1878, he would return to teaching and also serve as an assistant at the Haynald Observatory in Kalocsa. In 1885 he became the director of the observatory, and would remain at this post until retiring due to poor health in 1913. He continued his astronomical observations even in retirement.

Fényi Gyula was noted for his observations of the Sun, including spectroscopic studies of solar prominences, as well as sun spots. He was the first person to demonstrate a correlation between the number of solar prominences and the number of sun spots. Between 1880 until 1919 he assembled over 6,000 drawings of the Sun, all using the same instrument. (These drawings are archived at the Heliophysical Observatory, in Debrecen, Hungary.) He published over 200 scientific papers in six languages. In 1916 he was elected a corresponding member of the Hungarian Academy of Sciences.

The crater Fényi on the Moon and asteroid 115254 Fényi are named after him.

== See also ==
- List of Jesuit scientists
- List of Roman Catholic scientist-clerics
