= Jaroslav Heyrovský =

Czech chemist and inventor (1890–1967)

Jaroslav Heyrovský ForMemRS
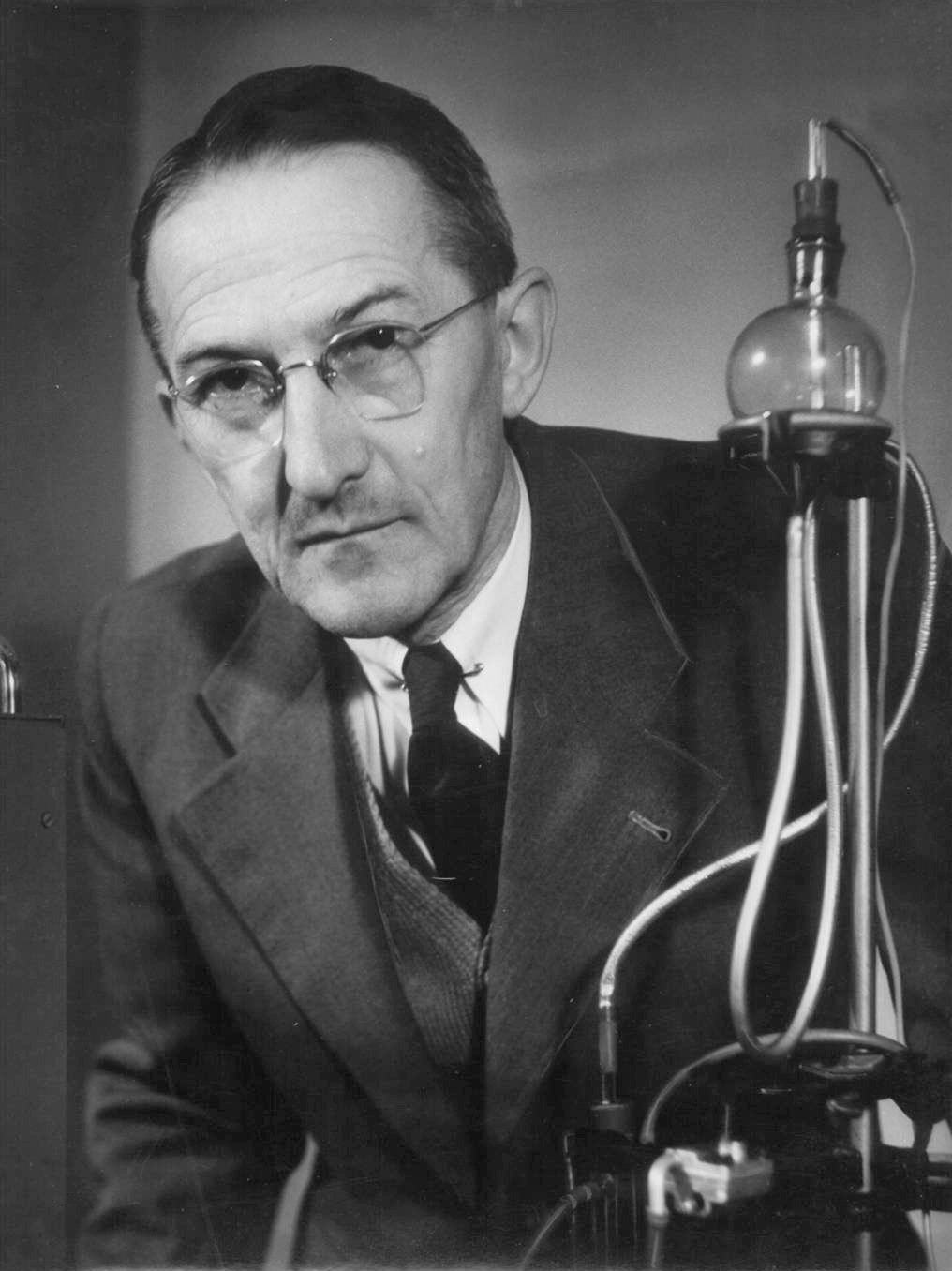
- Born: 20 December 1890; Prague, Kingdom of Bohemia, Austria-Hungary
- Died: 27 March 1967 (aged 76); Prague, Czechoslovakia
- Education: Charles University (PhD); University College London (BSc, DSc)
- Known for: Inventing polarography Heyrovský step
- Awards: ForMemRS (1965); Nobel Prize in Chemistry (1959)
- Scientific career
- Fields: Chemistry
- Doctoral advisor: Frederick G. Donnan; William Ramsay

Jaroslav Heyrovský (Czech: [ˈjaroslav ˈɦɛjrofskiː]; 20 December 1890 – 27 March 1967) was a Czech chemist and inventor who received the Nobel Prize in Chemistry in 1959 for his invention of polarography.

== Life and work ==
Jaroslav Heyrovský was born in Prague on 20 December 1890, the fifth child of Leopold Heyrovský, Professor of Roman Law at the Charles University in Prague, and his wife Clara, née Hanl von Kirchtreu. He obtained his early education at secondary school until 1909 when he began his study of chemistry, physics, and mathematics at the Charles University in Prague. From 1910 to 1914 he continued his studies at University College London, under Professors Sir William Ramsay, W. C. McC. Lewis, and F. G. Donnan, taking his B.Sc. degree in 1913. He was particularly interested in working with Professor Donnan, on electrochemistry.

During the First World War Heyrovský worked in a military hospital as a dispensing chemist and radiologist, which enabled him to continue his studies and to take his Ph.D. degree in Prague in 1918 and D.Sc. in London in 1921.

Heyrovský started his university career as assistant to Professor B. Brauner in the Institute of Analytical Chemistry of the Charles University, Prague; he was promoted to Associate Professor in 1922 and in 1926 he became the university's first professor of physical chemistry.

Heyrovský's invention of the polarographic method dates from 1922 and he concentrated his whole further scientific activity on the development of this new branch of electrochemistry. He formed a school of Czech polarographers in the university, and was himself in the forefront of polarographic research. In 1950 Heyrovský was appointed as the Director of the newly established Polarographic Institute, which was incorporated into the Czechoslovak Academy of Sciences in 1952.

In 1926 Professor Heyrovský married Marie (Mary) Koranová, and the couple had two children, a daughter, Jitka, and a son, Michael.

Jaroslav Heyrovský died on 27 March 1967. He was interred in the Vyšehrad cemetery in Prague.

== Honors, awards, legacy ==
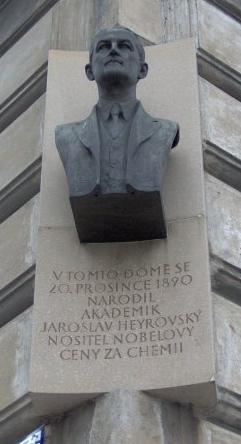
Memorial plaque in Kaprova street in Prague

Many universities and seats of learning honored Heyrovský. He was elected Fellow of University College, London, in 1927, and received honorary doctorates from the Technical University, Dresden in 1955, the University of Warsaw in 1956, the University Aix-Marseille in 1959, and the University of Paris in 1960. He was granted honorary membership in the American Academy of Arts and Sciences in 1933; in the Hungarian Academy of Sciences in 1955; the Indian Academy of Sciences, Bangalore, in 1955; the Polish Academy of Sciences, Warsaw, in 1962; was elected Corresponding Member of the German Academy of Sciences, Berlin, in 1955; member of the German Academy of Natural Scientists, Leopoldina (Halle-Saale) in 1956; Foreign Member of the Royal Danish Academy of Sciences, Copenhagen, in 1962; Vice-President of the International Union of Physics from 1951 to 1957; President and first honorary member of the Polarographic Society, London; honorary member of the Polarographic Society of Japan; honorary member of the Chemical Societies of Czechoslovakia, Austria, Poland, England and India. In 1965, Heyrovský was elected a Foreign Member of the Royal Society (ForMemRS) in 1965.

In Czechoslovakia Heyrovský was awarded the State Prize, First Grade, in 1951, and in 1955 the Order of the Czechoslovak Republic.

Heyrovský lectured on polarography in the United States in 1933, the USSR in 1934, England in 1946, Sweden in 1947, the People's Republic of China in 1958, and in U.A.R. (Egypt) in 1960 and 1961.

The crater Heyrovský on the Moon is named in his honour.

== See also ==
- Hydrogen evolution reaction
