= Bailly (crater) =

Lunar surface depression

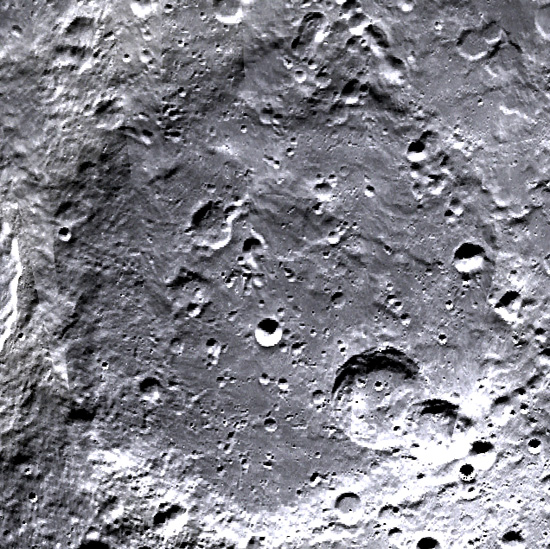
- Clementine mosaic
- Coordinates: 66.8°S 69.4°W
- Diameter: 300.56 km (186.76 mi)
- Depth: 4.86 km (3.02 mi)
- Colongitude: 65° at sunrise
- Formation: Nectarian
- Eponym: Jean S. Bailly

Bailly is an enormous lunar impact crater that is located near the south-west limb of the Moon. It is the largest walled plain on the visible face of the Moon, spanning a diameter of 300 km. The oblique viewing angle gives the crater a foreshortened appearance, and the location near the limb can limit visibility due to libration. The most favorable time for viewing this feature is near the full moon when the terminator is crossing the crater wall.

This formation was named after French astronomer Jean S. Bailly (1736-1793). Its designation was officially adopted by the International Astronomical Union in 1935. The name was introduced into lunar nomenclature by Johann H. Schröter in 1791.

== Description ==
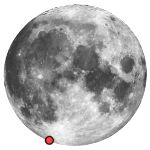
Location of Bailly crater, with its marking at the bottom

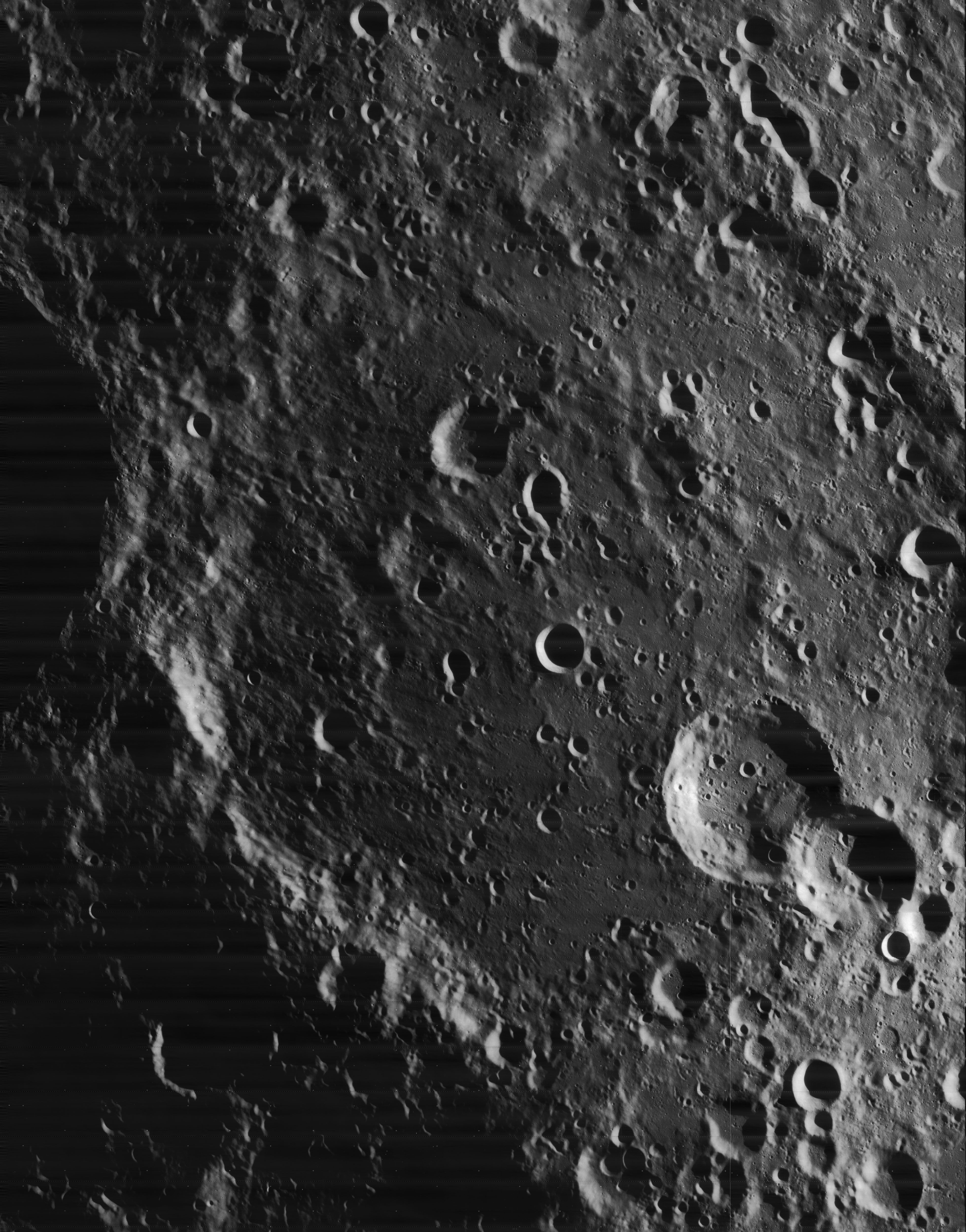
Lunar Orbiter 4 image

This class of formation is known as a peak ring basin, which has a single interior topographic ring or a discontinuous ring of peaks with no central peak. It is the largest crater on the near side of the Moon. In area it is comparable in size to a small mare. It lies north of the crater Le Gentil and east of Hausen. Further west of Bailly are the (unofficially named) Montes Dörfel mountains.

Due to the size and the worn state of this crater, it is estimated to be more than 3 billion years old, and is part of the Nectarian system. Bailly's uneven crater floor has remained free of basaltic flooding, and it is covered with a multitude of ridges and craters. The entire crater has been battered and worn, and the outer ramparts are eroded and in some places have even been worn away by myriad impacts. It likely is covered by ejecta from Hausen crater. Peaks along its western walls reach heights of 3.0 to 3.7 km while the eastern wall has peaks of up to 4.3 km. If Bailly ever possessed a central peak, it is no longer discernible. However, the battered remains of a peak ring is possible. Due to its current condition, observers have termed this walled plain a 'field of ruins'.

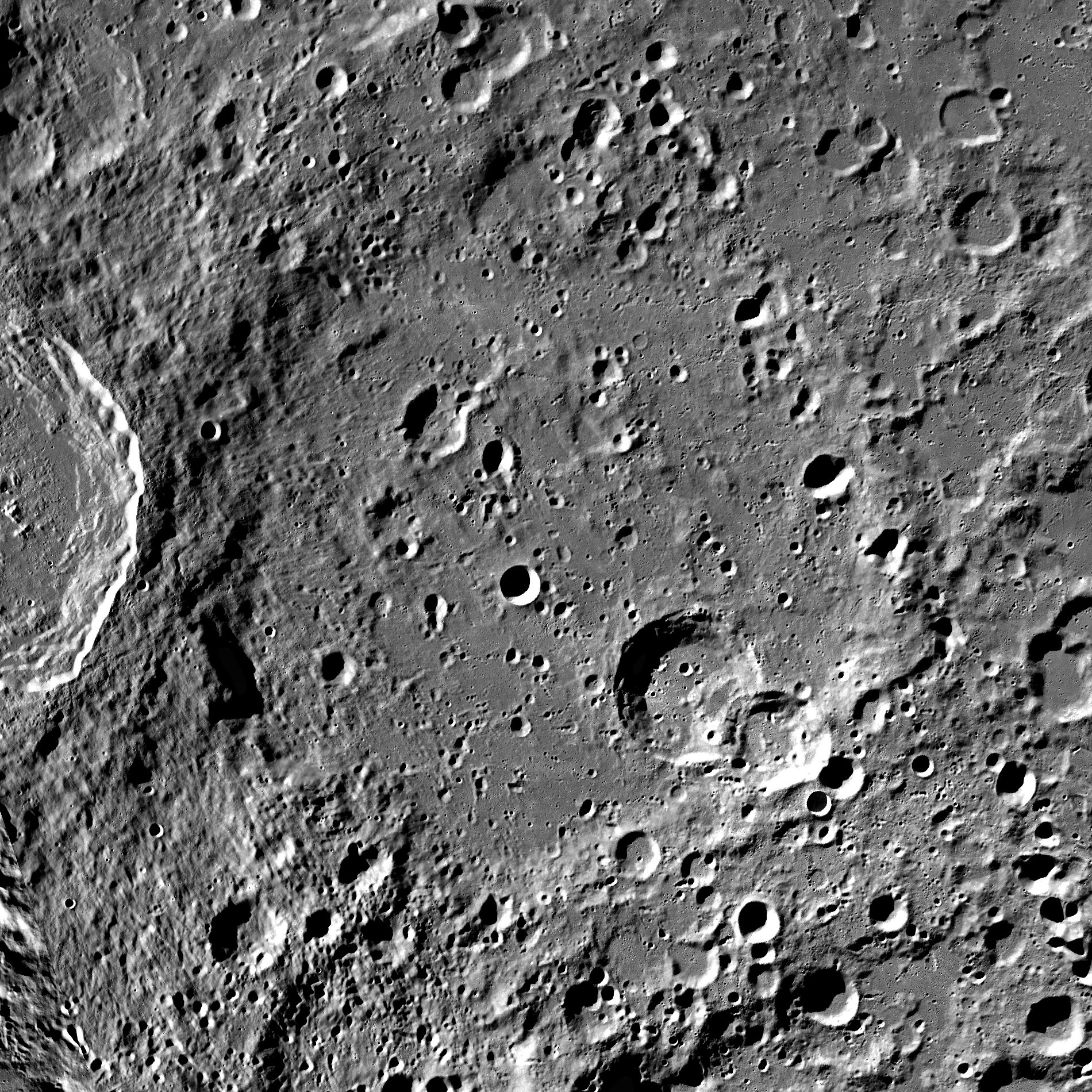
LRO mosaic

== Satellite craters ==
The south-eastern part of the crater is home to two notable craters, designated Bailly A and Bailly B. These craters overlap, and Bailly A lies across the rim of Bailly's mountainous wall. Selenographer Giovanni Battista Riccioli named Bailly B, Bartolus for fellow Ferrarese Jesuit Daniello Bartoli (1608-1685) in his Almagestum novum (1651). The name was not recognized by the IAU.

By convention the following features are identified on lunar maps by placing the letter on the side of the crater midpoint that is closest to Bailly.

Bailly	Coordinates	Diameter
A	69.28°S 59.57°W	43 km
B	68.74°S 63.25°W	62 km
C	65.79°S 70.34°W	19 km
D	65.25°S 72.38°W	27 km
E	62.45°S 65.75°W	16 km
F	67.46°S 69.59°W	17 km
G	65.63°S 59.47°W	19 km
H	63.57°S 62.59°W	13 km
K	62.73°S 76.71°W	19 km
L	60.71°S 71.13°W	21 km
M	61.16°S 67.51°W	20 km
N	60.53°S 63.68°W	11 km
O	69.59°S 56.92°W	19 km
P	59.57°S 60.67°W	14 km
R	64.66°S 79.18°W	17 km
T	66.49°S 73.83°W	19 km
U	71.24°S 76.03°W	24 km
V	71.91°S 81.45°W	32 km
Y	61.04°S 65.60°W	14 km
Z	60.22°S 65.86°W	13 km
