= Steklov (surname) =

Steklov (Russian: Стеклов, from steklo, meaning glass) is a Russian masculine surname, its feminine counterpart is Steklova. The surname may refer to the following notable people:

- Vadim Steklov (born 1985), Russian football player
- Vladimir Steklov (mathematician) (1864–1926), Russian mathematician
- Vladimir Steklov (actor) (born 1948), Russian actor
- Yuri Steklov (1873–1941), Russian politician, historian and writer
