= Mendel (lunar crater) =

Crater on the Moon

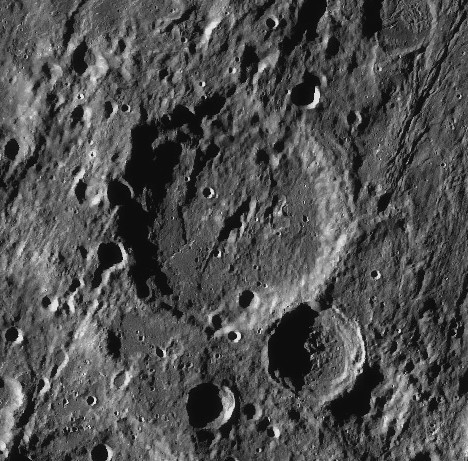
- LRO image
- Coordinates: 48.8°S 109.4°W
- Diameter: 138 km
- Depth: Unknown
- Colongitude: 113° at sunrise
- Formation: Pre-Nectarian
- Eponym: Gregor Mendel

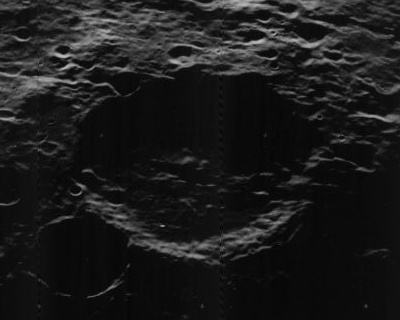
Oblique Lunar Orbiter 5 image, facing west

Mendel is a large Impact crater that lies on the far side of the Moon. It is located in the southern fringe of the huge skirt of ejecta that surrounds the Mare Orientale impact basin. To the south-southwest of Mendel is Lippmann, an even larger crater.

On the lunar geologic timescale, Mendel dates to the Pre-Nectarian period. This is a worn and eroded crater formation, with several small craters along the rim. The younger Mendel J is attached to the southeastern edge and shares part of the rim. The small Mendel B lies across the rim to the northeast. A pair of small craters also cross the western rim. Parts of the inner wall of Mendel display worn, terrace-like features that have become rounded. The interior floor of Mendel displays deposits and depressions that may have been formed by ejecta from the Mare Orientale formation.

This crater lies on the western margin of the Mendel-Rydberg Basin, a 630 km wide impact basin of Nectarian age. The basin is named after Mendel and the smaller Rydberg to the east of Mendel.

== Satellite craters ==
By convention these features are identified on lunar maps by placing the letter on the side of the crater midpoint that is closest to Mendel.

Mendel	Latitude	Longitude	Diameter
B	46.5° S	107.7° W	18 km
J	51.6° S	107.4° W	58 km
V	46.7° S	116.7° W	66 km
