= Heyrovsky (crater) =

Crater on the Moon

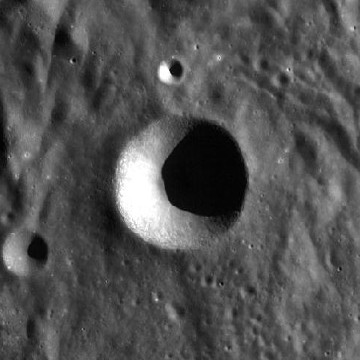
- LRO WAC image
- Coordinates: 39.6°S 95.3°W
- Diameter: 16 km
- Depth: Unknown
- Colongitude: 96° at sunrise
- Eponym: Jaroslav Heyrovský

Heyrovsky is a small lunar impact crater on the far side of the Moon. This crater lies just beyond the southwestern limb, in an area of the surface that is sometimes brought into view of the Earth during periods of favorable libration and illumination by sunlight. It lies within the southern part of the wide skirt of ejecta that surrounds the Mare Imbrium impact basin.

This is a circular crater formation with an interior that is shaped like a bowl. The inner walls are simple in structure, and slope straight town to the small interior floor at the midpoint. The crater interior has a generally higher albedo than its surroundings, giving it a somewhat brighter appearance.

Heyrovsky was formerly known as Drude S, the only satellite of the crater Drude. In The Clementine Atlas of the Moon (2012) it is listed twice, under both names.
