= Acta Eruditorum =

European scientific journal (1682–1782)

Nova Acta Eruditorum
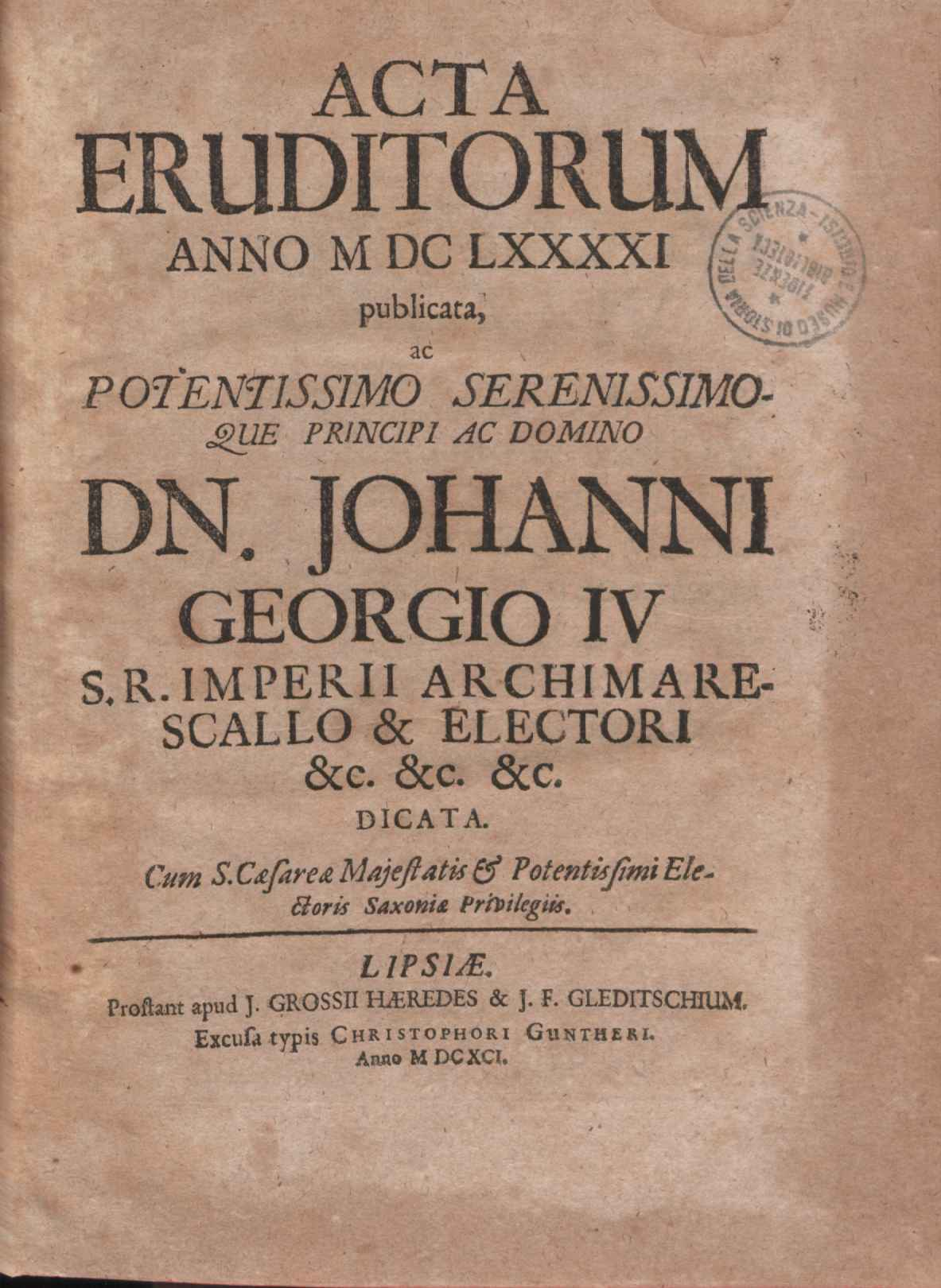
- Language: Latin

Publication details
- Former name: Acta Eruditorum
- History: 1682–1782

Standard abbreviations
- ISO 4: Nova Acta Erud.

Acta Eruditorum (from Latin: Acts of the Erudite) was the first scientific journal of the German-speaking lands of Europe, published from 1682 to 1782.

== History ==
Acta Eruditorum was founded in 1682 in Leipzig by Otto Mencke, who became its first editor, with support from Gottfried Leibniz in Hanover, who contributed 13 articles over the journal's first four years. It was published by Johann Friedrich Gleditsch, with sponsorship from the Duke of Saxony, and was patterned after the French Journal des savants and the Italian Giornale de'letterati. The journal was published monthly, entirely in Latin, and contained excerpts from new writings, reviews, small essays and notes. Most of the articles were devoted to the natural sciences and mathematics, including contributions (apart from Leibniz) from, e.g., Jakob Bernoulli, Humphry Ditton, Leonhard Euler, Ehrenfried Walther von Tschirnhaus, Pierre-Simon Laplace and Jérôme Lalande, but also from humanists and philosophers such as Veit Ludwig von Seckendorff, Stephan Bergler, Christian Thomasius and Christian Wolff.

After Otto Mencke's death in 1707, Acta Eruditorum was directed by his son, Johann Burckhardt Mencke, who died in 1732. The journal had changed its name by then to Nova Acta Eruditorum. Beginning in 1756 it was led by Karl Andreas Bel.

== Role in the Calculus War ==
Although Mencke once exchanged letters and publications with Isaac Newton, Newton was not a correspondent of Acta. The dispute between Newton and Leibniz over credit for the development of differential calculus started with a contribution by Leibniz to the May 1697 issue of Acta Eruditorum, in response to which Fatio de Duillier, feeling slighted by being omitted from Leibniz's list of the best mathematicians of Europe, announced that Newton had discovered calculus before Leibniz and the latter had probably even relied on Newton's achievements. In the following acrimonious squabble, Acta by and large acted as a mouthpiece for Leibniz's camp, much as Philosophical Transactions did for Newton's. Mencke tried to tone down the dispute, but rebuttals from both sides were too forceful. "Where Mencke was powerless to call the tune, he did his utmost at least to set the tone," says H. Laeven in his description of the row. This dispute also influenced Acta to express the feelings of national cohesion and defining German scholarship within the international field of influence.
