= Nectarian =

Geologic period, 3920 to 3850 million years ago

Chronology
Periods on the Lunar Geologic Timescale. Axis scale: Millions of years ago.

Usage information
- Celestial body: Earth's Moon
- Time scale(s) used: Lunar geologic timescale

Definition
- Chronological unit: Period

The Nectarian Period of the lunar geologic timescale was from 3.920 billion years ago to 3.850 billion years ago. It is the period during which the Nectaris Basin and other major basins were formed by large impact events. Ejecta from Nectaris form the upper part of the densely cratered terrain found in lunar highlands. The period ended with the formation of the Imbrium basin, which initiated the Imbrian Period. Magnetic anomalies found in some Nectarian Period basins suggest that the Moon possessed a core dynamo magnetic field at that time.

Millions of years before present
