= Lallemand (crater) =

Crater on the Moon

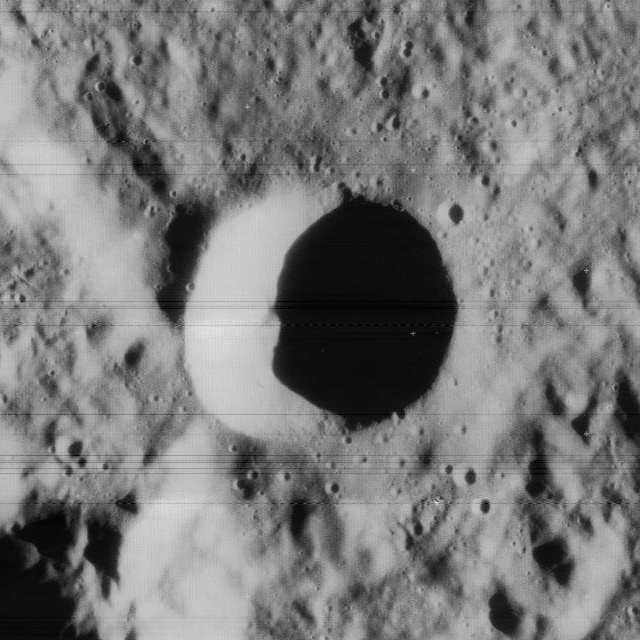
- Lunar Orbiter 4 image
- Coordinates: 14.40°S 84.21°W
- Diameter: 16.69 km
- Depth: Unknown
- Colongitude: 84° at sunrise
- Eponym: André Lallemand

Lallemand is a small lunar impact crater that lies near the western limb of the Moon, in a region where the visibility is affected by libration effects. Because of its location, when viewed from the Earth the crater is viewed nearly from the side, limiting the amount of detail that can be seen. It lies in the northeast part of a mountain range named the Montes Rook that forms a ring around the enormous Mare Orientale impact basin. To the northeast is the Lacus Autumni and to the northwest lies the Lacus Veris, both forming small lunar maria along the sides of the range.

This is a roughly circular, bowl-shaped crater that lies along the northeastern edge of the Montes Rook. Its interior walls slope down to a small floor at the midpoint. This crater was previously designated Kopff A, before being named for French astronomer André Lallemand by the IAU in 1985. Kopff is located to the southwest along the eastern edge of the Mare Orientale.
