= Wright (lunar crater) =

Crater on the Moon

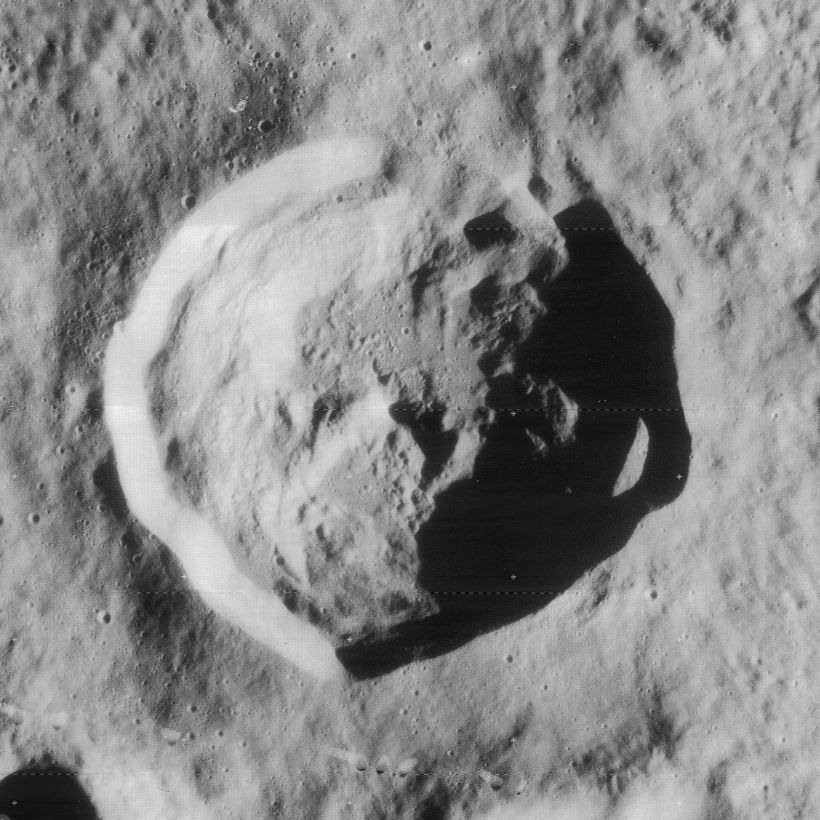
- Oblique Lunar Orbiter 4 image
- Coordinates: 31.6°S 86.6°W
- Diameter: 40 km (25 mi)
- Depth: unknown
- Colongitude: 87° at sunrise
- Eponym: Frederick E. Wright, Thomas Wright, and William H. Wright

Wright is a lunar impact crater that is located near the western limb of the Moon. It lies on the irregular plain between the Montes Cordillera and Montes Rook, two ring-shaped mountain ranges that surround the Mare Orientale. Just to the southeast of the crater is the slightly larger crater Shaler. To the north of Wright is the crater Pettit.

The outer rim of Wright is somewhat irregular, with an outward bulge along the northeastern side. The rim is sharp-edged, and the inner walls have slumped down to form a shelf along parts of the side. The interior floor is uneven surfaced, particularly in the eastern half. The satellite crater Wright A lies about half a crater diameter to the south-southwest, along the edge of the Montes Cordillera.

Due to the location of this crater, it is viewed nearly edge-on from Earth, limiting the amount of detail that can be seen. In addition, this crater can sometimes become hidden from sight due to libration of the Moon in its orbit.

This crater is named after American astronomer Frederick E. Wright (1878–1953).

== Satellite craters ==
By convention these features are identified on lunar maps by placing the letter on the side of the crater midpoint that is closest to Wright.

Wright	Latitude	Longitude	Diameter
A	32.8° S	87.2° W	11 km

== See also ==
- 1747 Wright, minor planet
- Wright (Martian crater)
