= Pettit (lunar crater) =

Crater on the Moon

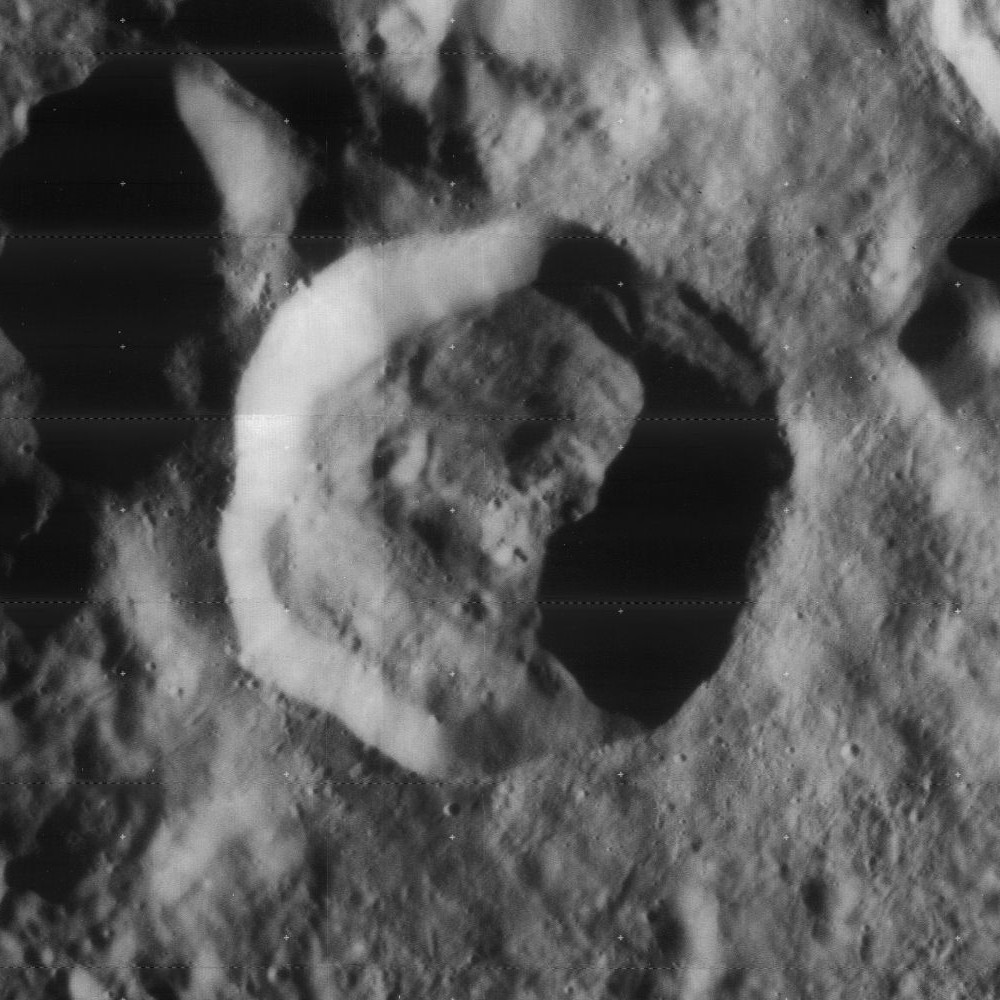
- Lunar Orbiter 4 image
- Coordinates: 27.5°S 86.6°W
- Diameter: 35 km
- Colongitude: 87° at sunrise
- Eponym: Edison Pettit

Pettit is a lunar impact crater that lies near the western limb of the Moon. It was named after American astronomer Edison Pettit. In this location the crater is viewed nearly from the side by observers on Earth, and visibility can be significantly affected by libration effects.

The crater lies among the rugged features of the Montes Rook, the inner ring of mountains that surround the Mare Orientale impact basin. It is nearly a twin of the crater Nicholson which lies less than one crater diameter to the northeast. Another similar formation is Wright almost due south.

The rim of this crater has something of the appearance of a rounded hexagon, with slightly flattened rims to the east and west. The rim is sharp-edged, and the inner wall material has slumped down to lie in a pile around the base. The interior floor is a rugged jumble, with a small central peak and hills to the north and west. Beyond the rim lies rugged terrain to the north and west, while the ground becomes less jumbled to the southeast beyond the edge of the mountain foothills.

This formation should not be mistaken for the similarly named crater Petit, a small feature on the eastern half of the Moon's near side.

== Satellite craters ==
By convention these features are identified on lunar maps by placing the letter on the side of the crater midpoint that is closest to Pettit.

Pettit	Latitude	Longitude	Diameter
C	24.8° S	88.9° W	8 km

The following crater has been renamed by the IAU.

- Pettit T — See Shuleykin (crater).

== See also ==
- Pettit (Martian crater)
