= Lowell (lunar crater) =

Crater on the Moon

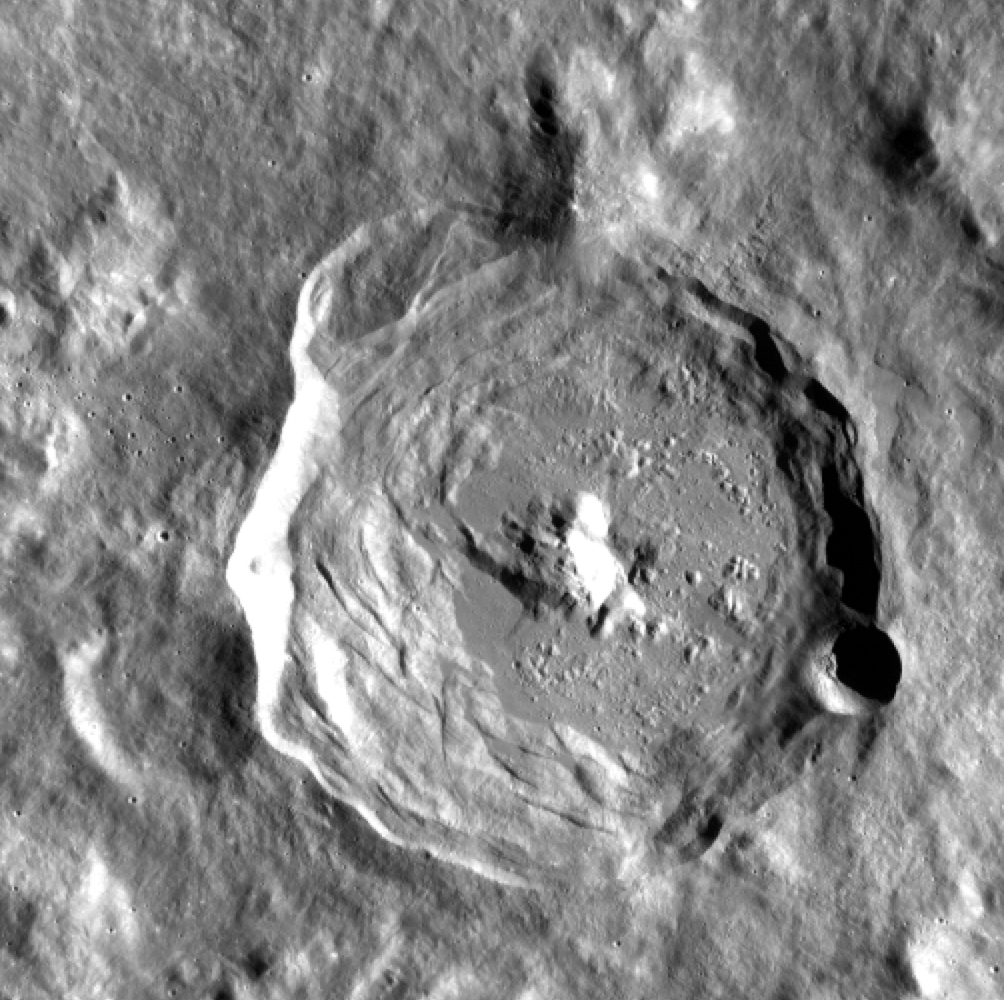
- Coordinates: 12.9°S 103.1°W
- Diameter: 66 km
- Depth: Unknown
- Colongitude: 104° at sunrise
- Eponym: Percival Lowell

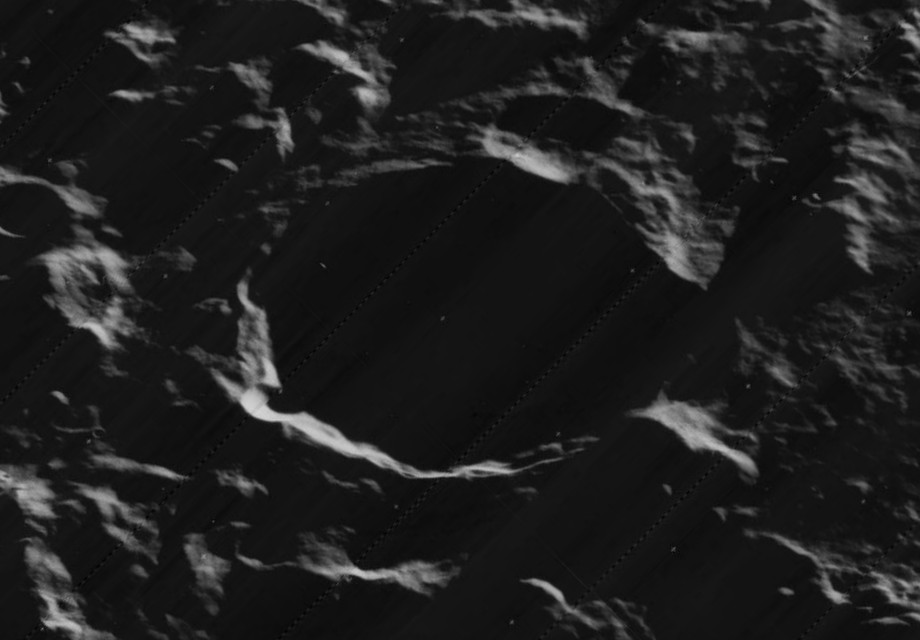
Oblique view from Lunar Orbiter 5 while the crater was at the terminator

Lowell is a lunar impact crater that lies just beyond the western limb on the far side of the Moon. It is embedded within the northwestern part of the Montes Rook mountain ring of the Mare Orientale impact basin. This portion of the Moon's far side is sometimes brought into view of the Earth during periods of favorable libration and lighting, although it is only seen from the edge.

The crater is circular in outline, with a well-defined edge. A small crater lies along the edge of the eastern rim. The infrared spectrum of pure crystalline plagioclase has been identified along the southeastern rim. The inner wall is wider along the western side, and there are some terrace structures. In the middle of the crater is a central peak on the interior floor. The spectra of this peak fits an anorthositic troctolite mineralogy, which originated from a depth of 6.6 to 10.2 km.

== Satellite craters ==
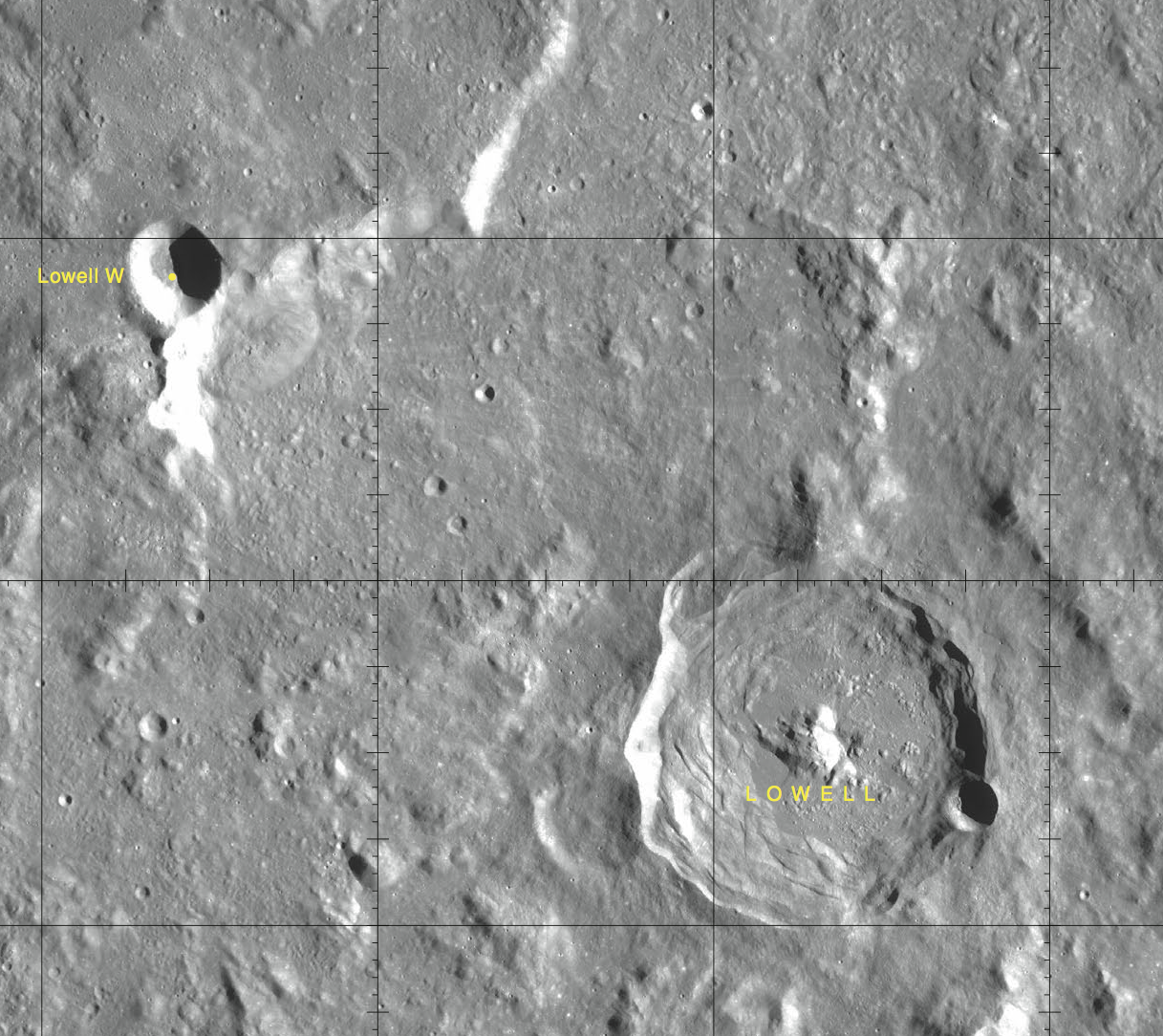
Lowell crater & satellite crater

By convention these features are identified on lunar maps by placing the letter on the side of the crater midpoint that is closest to Lowell.

Lowell	Latitude	Longitude	Diameter
W	10.0° S	107.0° W	18 km
