= Eichstadt (crater) =

Lunar impact crater

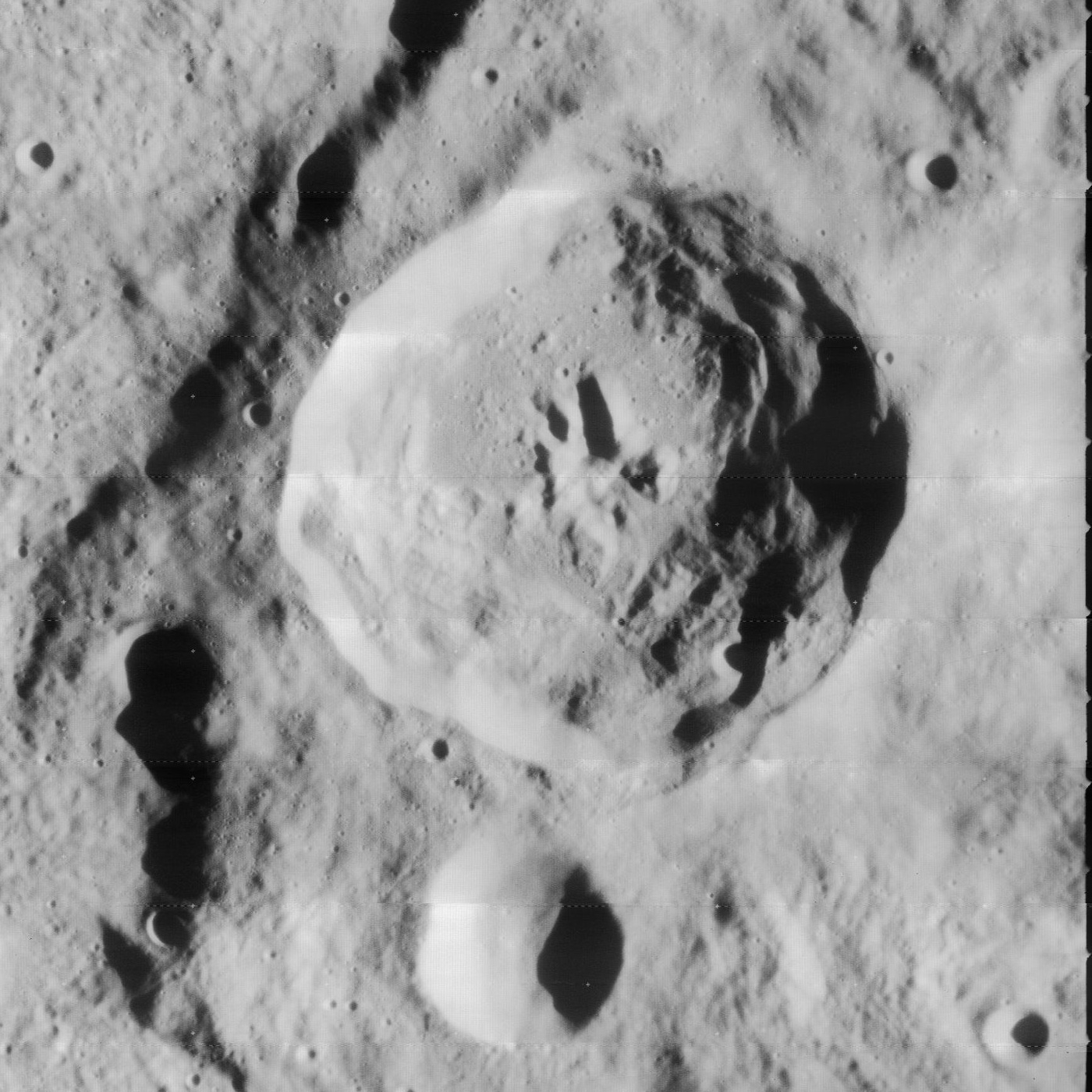
- Lunar Orbiter 4 image of Eichstadt, with Eichstadt E below center
- Coordinates: 22.6°S 78.3°W
- Diameter: 49.57 km (30.80 mi)
- Depth: 3.4 km (2.1 mi)
- Colongitude: 79° at sunrise
- Formation: Eratosthenian
- Eponym: Lorentz Eichstadt

Eichstadt is a lunar impact crater that is located in the eastern section of the Montes Cordillera range that encircles the Mare Orientale impact basin. It lies toward the southwestern limb of the Moon, and so appears oblong when viewed from the Earth due to foreshortening. Over 200 kilometers to the east of Eichstadt are the craters Darwin and Lamarck, and to the south is Krasnov.

This formation dates to the Eratosthenian period of the lunar geologic timescale. The rim of this crater is well-defined and forms a somewhat uneven circle. There are slight outward bulges in the perimeter to the south-southeast, southwest, and to the north. There are some terraces along the inner wall and the top edge is slumped. In the central part of the interior floor is a cluster of low, rugged ridges.

The crater is named after German mathematician and astronomer Lorentz Eichstadt (1596-1660). In 1651, his name was included in the lunar nomenclature of Italian astronomer Giovanni B. Riccioli as Eichstadius. Its modern designation was formally adopted by the International Astronomical Union in 1935. The Orientale basin ring that forms the Cordillera mountains is sometimes referred to as the Eichstadt ring after this crater.

== Satellite craters ==
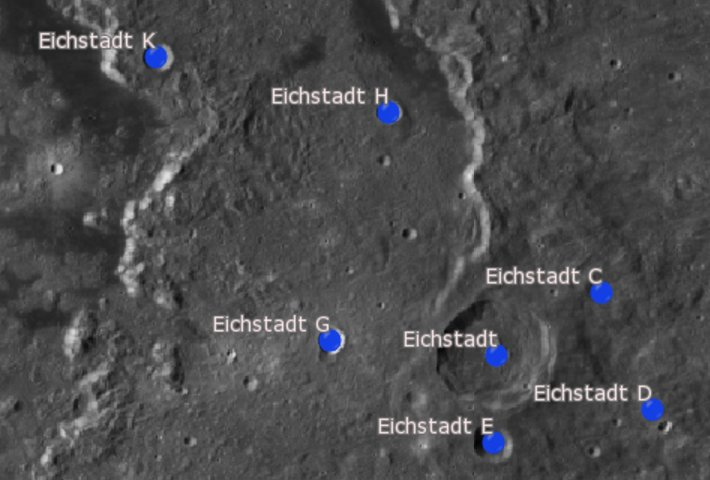
Satellite features of Eichstadt

By convention these features are identified on lunar maps by placing the letter on the side of the crater midpoint that is closest to Eichstadt.

Eichstadt	Latitude	Longitude	Diameter
C	21.7° S	76.7° W	15 km
D	23.5° S	76.0° W	7 km
E	23.9° S	78.3° W	18 km
G	22.4° S	80.7° W	11 km
H	19.0° S	79.9° W	11 km
K	18.2° S	83.2° W	13 km
