= Julius Heinrich Franz =

German astronomer (1847–1913)

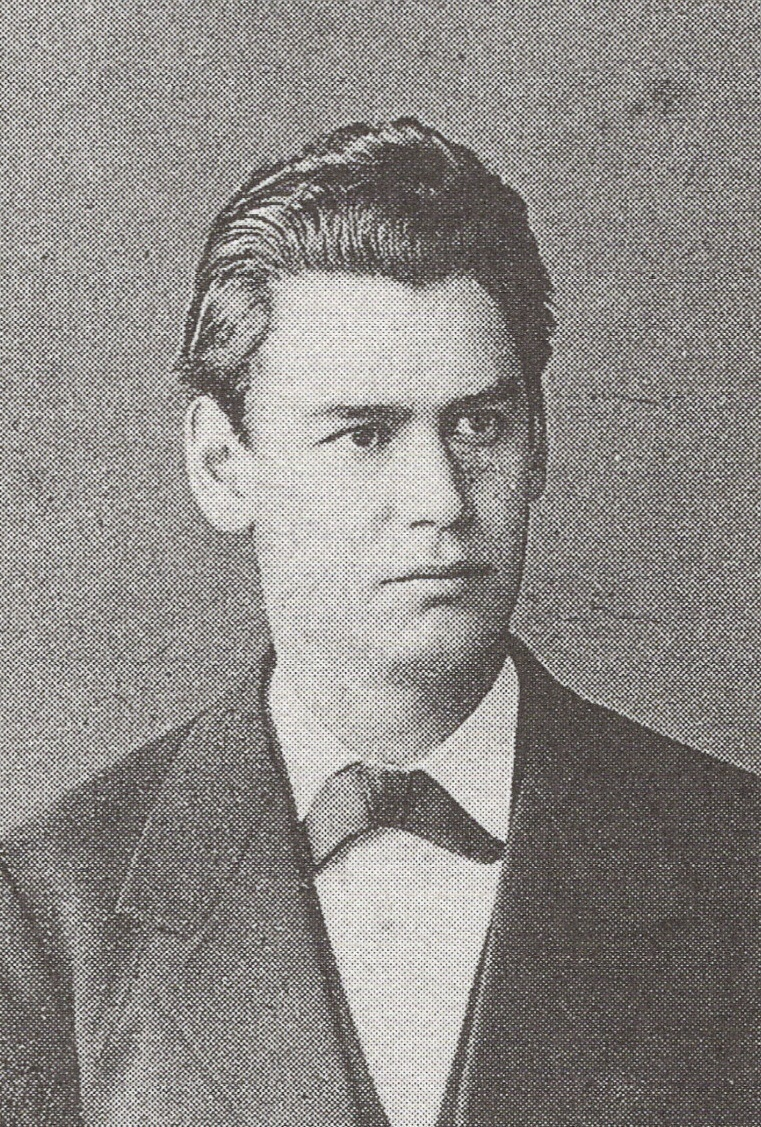
Julius Heinrich Franz's Portrait

Julius Heinrich Franz (28 June 1847 – 28 January 1913) was a German astronomer.

Franz was born in Rummelsburg, Prussian Pomerania, he studied at the Universities of Greifswald, Halle and Berlin, after which he was the principal astronomer at the Royal Observatory in Königsberg. In 1882 he was a member of a team sent to the town of Aiken, South Carolina, to observe the transit of Venus. Toward the end of the century he replaced Johann Galle as the director of the observatory at the University of Breslau.

He is most noted for his measurements of features near the lunar limbs. He published a popular book about the Moon in 1906 called Der Mond. In this work Julius named some lunar mares along the limb the Mare Orientale, Mare Autumni and Mare Veris. The later two were later renamed to the Lacus Autumni and Lacus Veris.

== Bibliography ==
- Die Figur des Mondes, 1899, Königsberg.
- Der Mond, 1906, Leipzig.
  - Second edition: Franz J. (1912). Der Mond (in German) (2 ed.). Leipzig: Druck und Verlag von B.G. Teubner.
- Franz J. (1913). Die Randlandschaften des Mondes (in German). Halle: Druck von Ehrhardt Karras.

== Honors ==
- The crater Franz on the Moon is named after him.
