= Krasnov (crater) =

Crater on the Moon

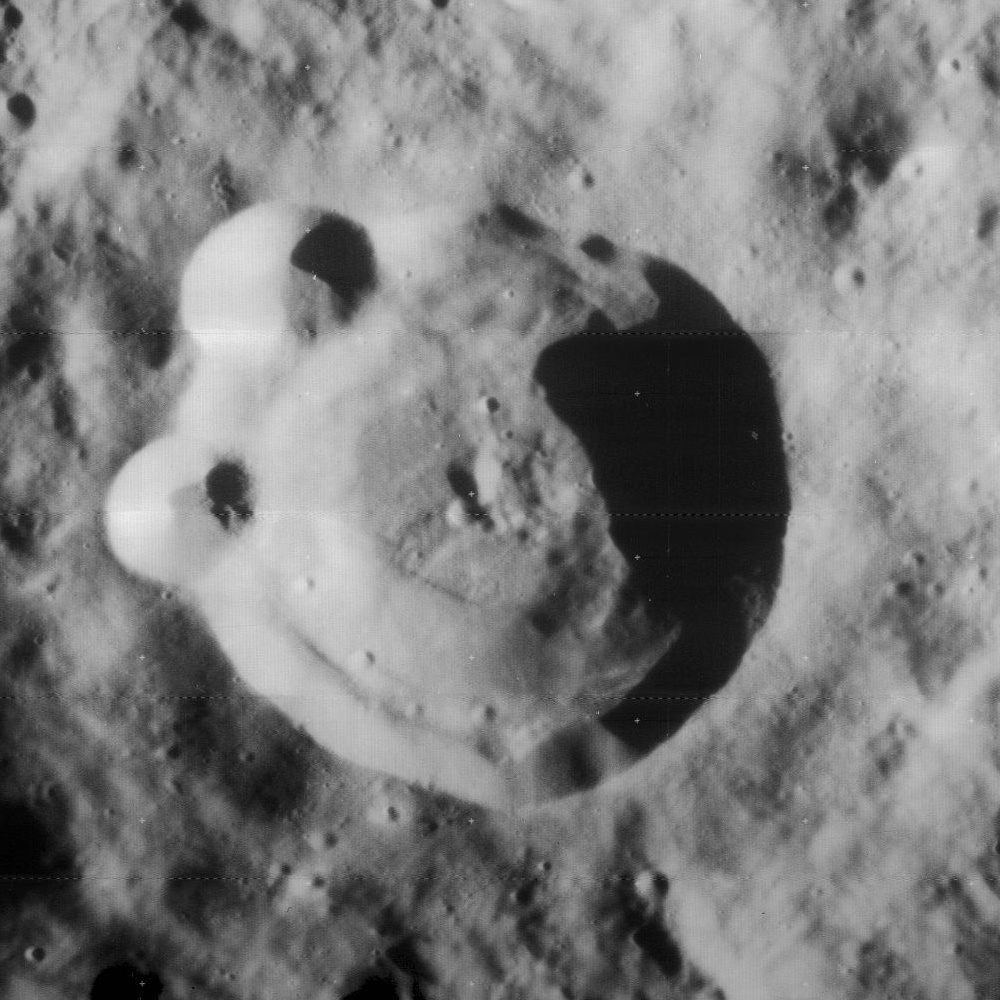
- Lunar Orbiter 4 image
- Coordinates: 29.9°S 79.6°W
- Diameter: 42 km
- Depth: Unknown
- Colongitude: 80° at sunrise
- Eponym: Aleksander V. Krasnov

Krasnov is a lunar impact crater that is located in the southeastern part of the Montes Cordillera range, near the southwest limb of the Moon. From the Earth this crater appears foreshortened, and visibility can be affected by libration. To the north of Krasnov is the crater Eichstadt and to the southwest is Shaler, both along the edge of the Montes Cordillera mountain ring.

The rim of this crater is sharp-edged and not notably worn. Nevertheless, a pair of small, circular craters lie across the western rim. The loose material along its inner walls has slumped down to form a pile along the base of the sides. Within this sloping ring is a somewhat irregular interior floor.

Formerly identified as satellite feature Lagrange F, this crater is named after Russian astronomer Aleksander V. Krasnov (1866–1907). Its designation was formally adopted by the IAU in 1964, although the crater is sometimes spelled 'Krasnoff'.

== Satellite craters ==
By convention these features are identified on lunar maps by placing the letter on the side of the crater midpoint that is closest to Krasnov.

Krasnov	Latitude	Longitude	Diameter
A	29.9° S	80.4° W	10 km
B	29.4° S	80.2° W	13 km
C	26.2° S	81.4° W	12 km
D	33.9° S	80.1° W	13 km
