= Shaler (crater) =

Lunar impact crater

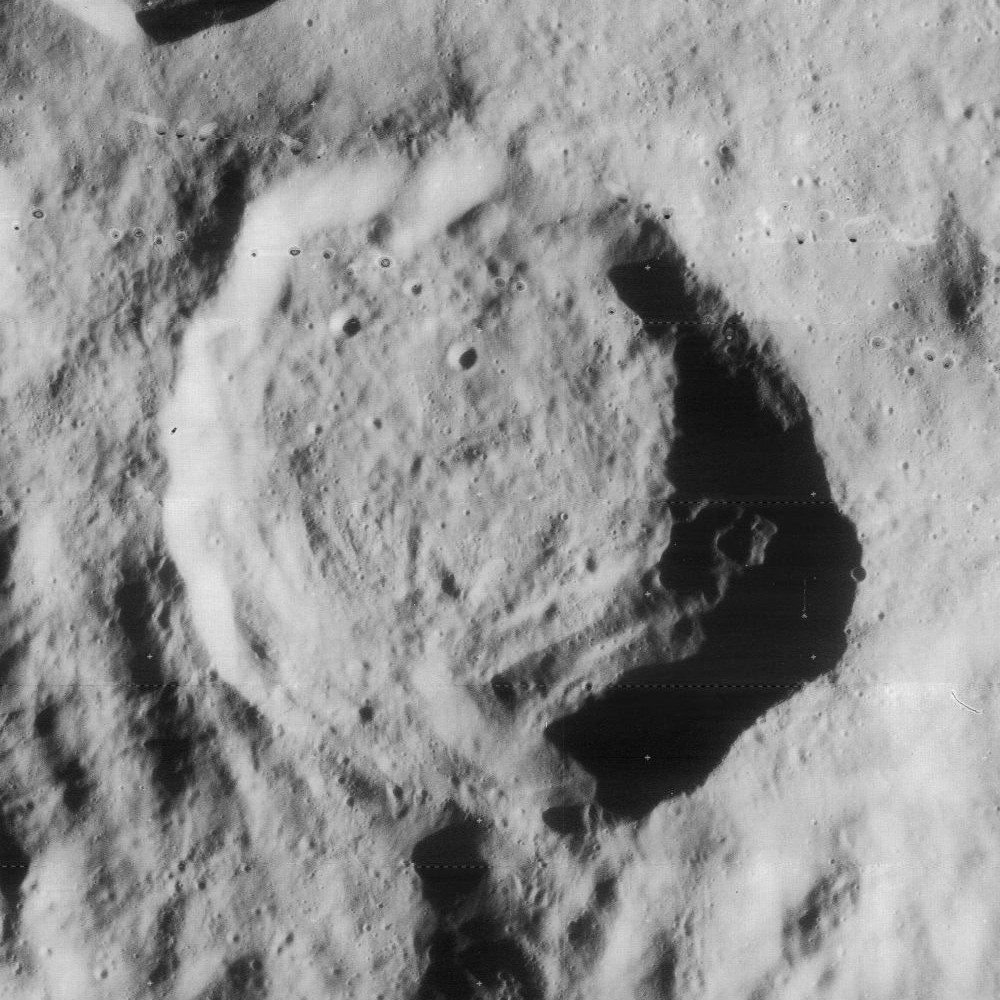
- Lunar Orbiter 4 image
- Coordinates: 32.0°S 85.2°W
- Diameter: 48 km
- Depth: Unknown
- Colongitude: 86° at sunrise
- Eponym: Nathaniel S. Shaler

Shaler is a lunar impact crater that lies on the southeast interior edge of the Montes Cordillera mountain ring that surrounds the immense Mare Orientale formation. It is located near the southwest limb of the Moon on the near side, and so is viewed nearly from on edge from the Earth. Just to the northwest of the crater is the slightly smaller crater Wright.

The long, irregular Vallis Bouvard valley begins at the southern rim of Shaler, and winds its way to the south-southeast towards the crater Baade. This is one of several such valleys that radiate away from the southeast edge of the Mare Orientale impact basin, the other two being Vallis Inghirami and Vallis Baade.

Shaler has been affected by its location on the southern edge of the Montes Cordillera, as the floor is rough and irregular, particularly toward the southwest where several small, parallel clefts appear in the surface. The rim is nearly circular, although slightly flattened along the south edge, and the edge remains sharply defined with little appearance of erosion.

This formation is named after American geologist and planeontologist Nathaniel S. Shaler (1841–1906).
