= Albert Bijaoui =

French astronomer (born 1943)

Albert Bijaoui (born in Monastir in 1943) is a French astronomer, former student of the Ecole Polytechnique (X 1962), renowned in image processing in astrophysics and its application in cosmology, he then prepared his PhD thesis at the Paris Observatory, under the supervision of André Lallemand. He defended his thesis at the Université Denis Diderot (Paris VII) in March 1971.

He has been a corresponding member of the French Academy of sciences since 1997.

== Biography ==
Trainee then Research Associate at the CNRS at the Paris Observatory, then at the Nice Observatory, he became an Astronomer at the Nice Observatory in 1972. He is Honorary Astronomer at the Observatoire de la Côte d'Azur since 2015. He was Director of the Centre de Dépouillement des Clichés Astronomiques at the Institut National d'Astronomie et de Géophysique between 1973 and 1981. He was also director of the Cassiopeia laboratory (UMR CNRS/OCA) between 2004 and 2007.

He experimented with André Lallemand's electronic camera in 1970 at the 1.93 m telescope at the Haute-Provence Observatory.

The asteroid Bijaoui was named in his honour.

== Scientific work ==
His research work has focused on various themes related to astronomical imaging. During the preparation of his thesis, he contributed to the development of electronography with the study and interpretation of the properties of André Lallemand's electronic camera. In parallel, he was involved in its exploitation for astrophysical purposes. With the creation in 1973 of the Centre de Dépouillement des Clichés Astronomiques at Nice Observatory, he was involved in the development of new methods for the analysis of astrophysical data and in the creation of software to exploit them for the French astronomical community. A system for the analysis of astronomical images has resulted. It will be widely disseminated in the astronomical community. With the commissioning of INAG's Schmidt telescope on the Calern plateau near Caussols in the Alpes-Maritimes, INAG has become involved in the analysis of large images of the sky obtained with this type of instrument. The resulting exploitation of galaxy counts led him to introduce the use of wavelet transforme and multi-scale methods in the processing of astronomical data. At the same time, it has explored the application in astronomy of many data analysis methods, such as Bayesian analysis, mathematical morphology or blind source separation methods, multi-band image analysis. His latest work concerned his involvement in the preparation of the ESA Gaia astronomical mission. In particular, he has developed specific tools for the determination of the atmospheric parameters of stars from their spectra, with model grid learning.

His work has been applied to several scientific fields in astrophysics, Earth observation and biological and medical imaging.
