= Kopff (crater) =

Crater on the Moon

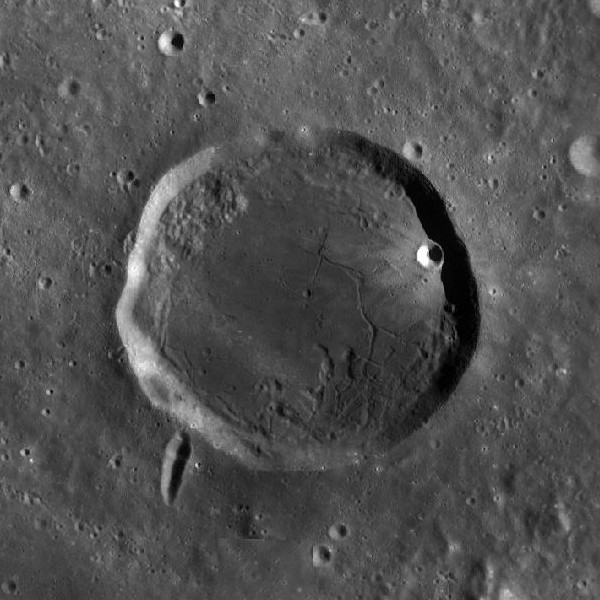
- LRO WAC image
- Coordinates: 17.39°S 89.68°W
- Diameter: 40.49 km (25.16 mi)
- Depth: 2.0 km (1.2 mi)
- Colongitude: 90° at sunrise
- Eponym: August Kopff

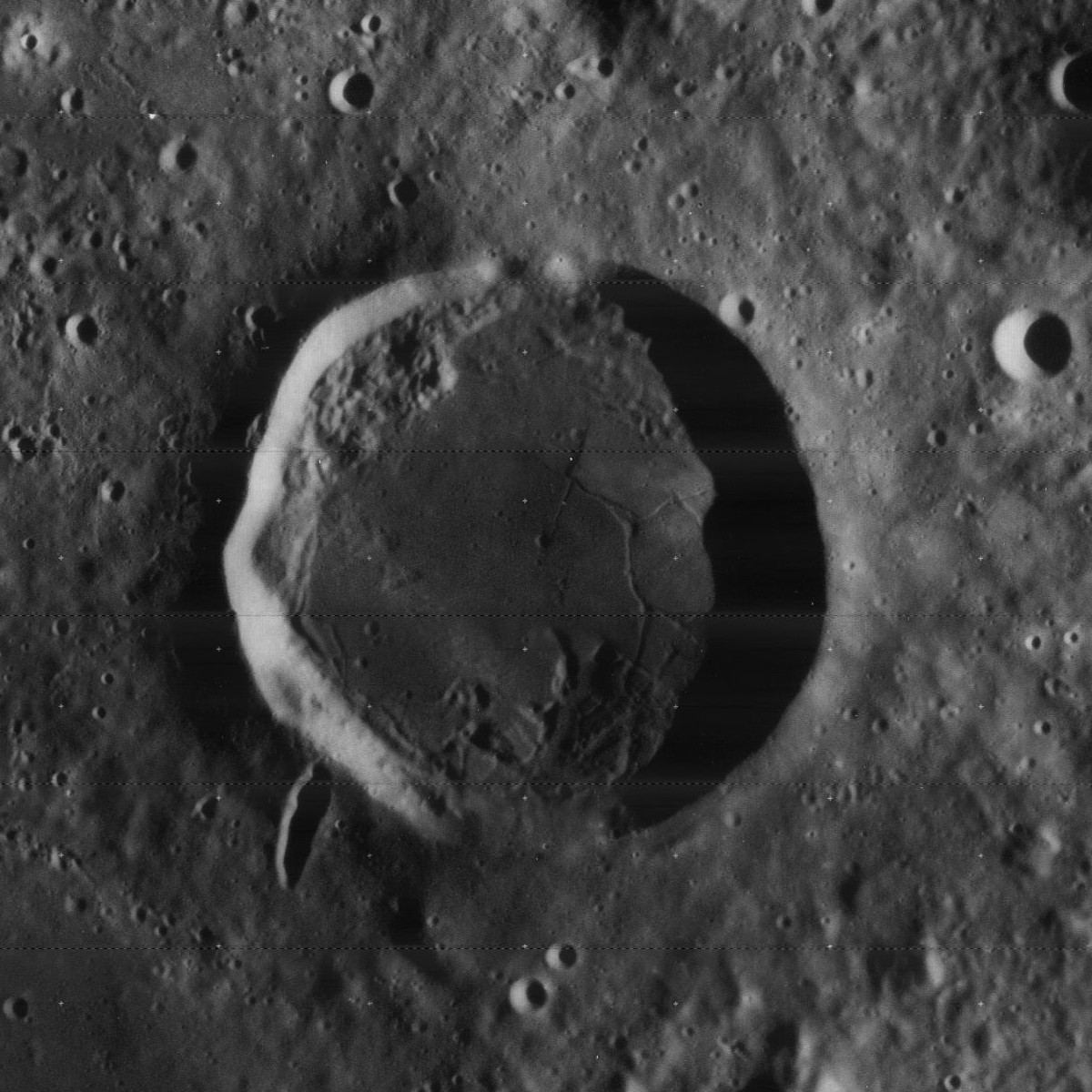
Lunar Orbiter 4 image

Kopff is a lunar impact crater that lies along the eastern edge of the inner Mare Orientale impact basin, on the western limb of the Moon. In this position the crater is seen from on edge from the Earth, and its visibility is affected by libration. This situation makes it difficult to discern much detail about the crater unless it is viewed from orbit.

At one time this crater was considered to have formed due to volcanic activity, in contrast to most lunar craters which are considered to have been created through impacts. However it is more likely that the crater was formed by an impact against a surface that was still partly molten. This has left the crater with a sharp-edged, circular rim and a flat, dark-hued interior floor. Indeed, the albedo of the interior floor matches that of the lunar mare to the west.

The southeast part of the floor is fractured with a series of narrow rilles. The floor along the northwest and northeast edges is more rugged, and these sections have escaped the lava that covered the remainder of the floor. The infrared spectrum of pure crystalline plagioclase has been identified on the northeast floor.

The crater was named after German astronomer August Kopff (1882–1960). Its designation was formally adopted by the International Astronomical Union in 1970.

== Satellite craters ==
By convention these features are identified on lunar maps by placing the letter on the side of the crater midpoint that is closest to Kopff.

Kopff	Latitude	Longitude	Diameter
B	16.9° S	86.2° W	8 km
C	18.3° S	86.1° W	14 km
D	19.9° S	89.8° W	13 km
E	16.0° S	89.8° W	12 km

The following crater has been renamed by the IAU.

- Kopff A — See Lallemand.
