= Montes Rook =

Mountain range on the Moon

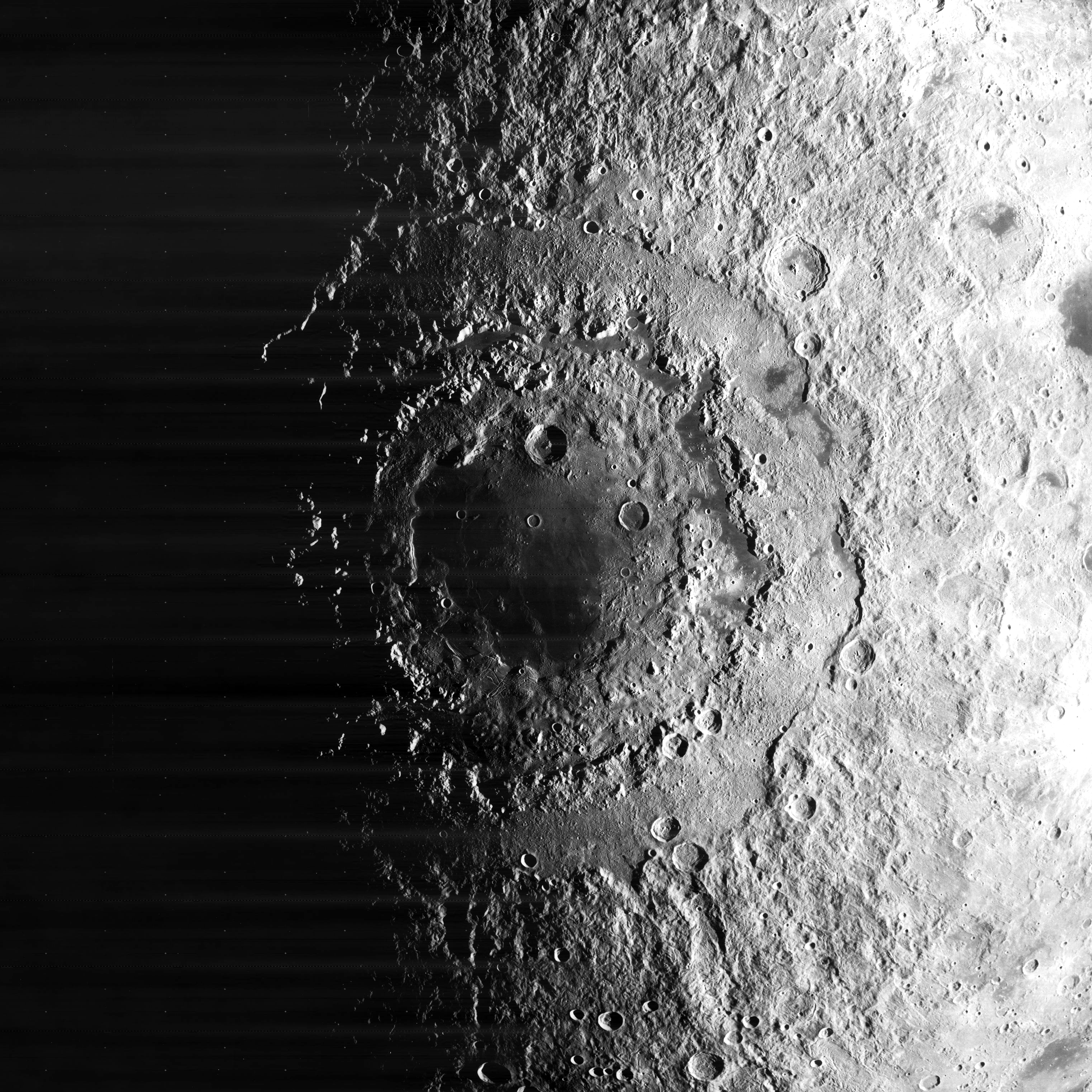
- 1967 photograph of the Mare Orientale impact basin made by NASA's Lunar Orbiter 4

Highest point
- Listing: Lunar mountains
- Coordinates: 20.6°S 82.5°W

Geography
- Location: the Moon

Montes Rook is a ring-shaped mountain range that lies along the western limb of the Moon, crossing over to the far side. It completely encircles the Mare Orientale, and forms part of a massive impact basin feature. This range in turn is encircled by the larger Montes Cordillera, which is separated from the Montes Rook by a rugged, ring-shaped plain.

The Montes Rook is actually a double-ring formation, sometimes divided into the outer Rook and the inner Rook, having respective diameters of 620 km and 480 km. The material excavated to form Montes Rook came from a mafic layer below an anorthositic zone. Many of the peaks in this ring are composed of pure anorthosite. Sections of the gap between these sub-ranges contain long valleys filled in places with basaltic lava, forming small lunar maria. One such section along the northeastern part of the range has been named Lacus Veris.

The selenographic coordinates of this range are 20.6° S, 82.5° W, and the diameter is 791 km. The range was named after the English astronomer Lawrence Rooke. Due to its location this range is viewed from the edge from Earth, and not much detail can be seen. However a partial view of the range can be obtained by projecting an image of the range acquired from the Earth onto the surface of a white globe. This is how William K. Hartmann and Gerard Kuiper discovered the ring shape of Montes Rook in the early 1960s.

Several named craters are embedded within the Montes Rook. Near the southwest outer edge are the craters Nicholson and Pettit. Kopff lies along the eastern inner edge, and Maunder on the northern inner side. Smaller craters include Lallemand to the northeast, Shuleykin to the south, and Fryxell in the west. Out of sight from the Earth, even during favorable librations, are the craters Lowell to the northwest, and Golitsyn to the west-southwest.
