= Shuleykin (crater) =

Crater on the Moon

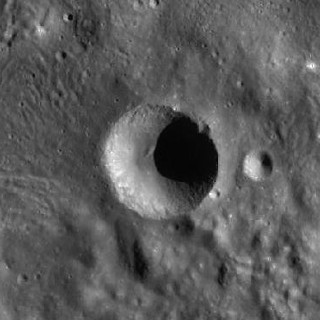
- LRO WAC image
- Coordinates: 27.1°S 92.5°W
- Diameter: 15 km
- Depth: Unknown
- Colongitude: 93° at sunrise
- Eponym: Mikhail V. Shuleykin

Shuleykin is a small lunar impact crater that lies to the south of Mare Orientale, within the ring-shaped Montes Rook. It is located just on the far side of the Moon, but this area can be viewed from the Earth during periods of favorable libration and lighting, although it can only be seen from the edge.

This crater was formed following the Orientale impact event, and so is younger. It has a circular, sharp-edged rim and inner walls that slope down to the small interior floor. It has not been noticeably eroded by subsequent impacts.
