= 1747 Wright =

Asteroid

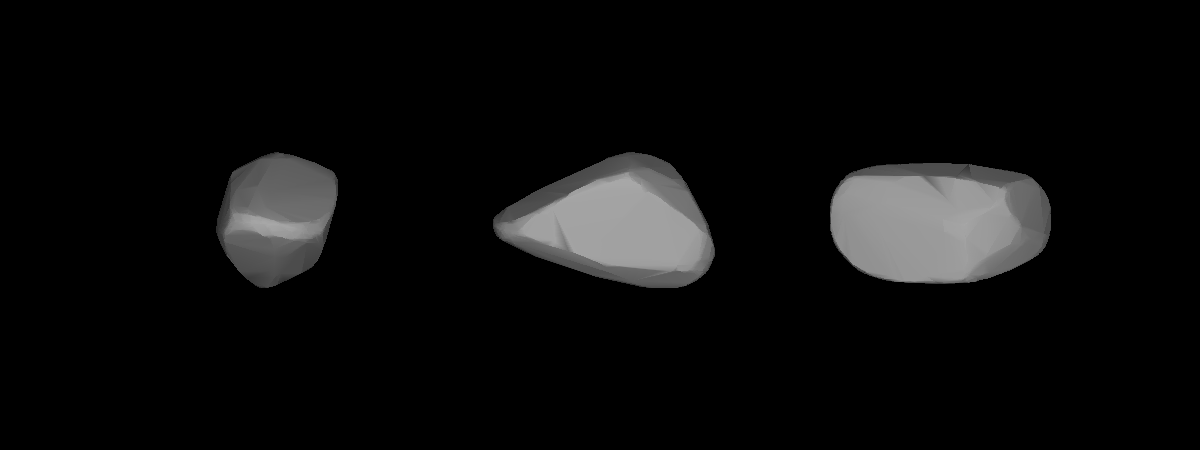
- Lightcurve-based 3D-model of Wright

Discovery
- Discovered by: C. A. Wirtanen
- Discovery site: Lick Obs.
- Discovery date: 14 July 1947

Designations
- Named after: William Wright (observatory's director)
- Alternative designations: 1947 NH
- Minor planet category: Mars-crosser

Orbital characteristics
- Epoch 4 September 2017 (JD 2458000.5)
- Uncertainty parameter 0
- Observation arc: 69.24 yr (25,290 days)
- Aphelion: 1.8977 AU
- Perihelion: 1.5207 AU
- Semi-major axis: 1.7092 AU
- Eccentricity: 0.1103
- Orbital period (sidereal): 2.23 yr (816 days)
- Mean anomaly: 174.63°
- Mean motion: 0° 26^{m} 27.96^{s} / day
- Inclination: 21.416°
- Longitude of ascending node: 268.39°
- Argument of perihelion: 340.43°

Physical characteristics
- Dimensions: 5.17±0.24 km 6.35±0.6 km (IRAS:2)
- Synodic rotation period: 5.28796±0.00005 h 5.2896±0.0002 h 5.290±0.001 h
- Geometric albedo: 0.2005±0.043 (IRAS:2); 0.321±0.034
- Spectral type: Tholen = unusual, noisy spectrum with resemblances to A-type spectrum SMASS = Sl; Bus–DeMeo = Sw
- Absolute magnitude (H): 13.35

1747 Wright, provisional designation 1947 NH, is a stony asteroid and a sizable Mars-crosser, approximately 6 kilometers in diameter.

It was discovered on 14 July 1947, by American astronomer Carl Wirtanen at Lick Observatory on Mount Hamilton near San Jose, California. It was named in memory of astronomer William Hammond Wright.

== Orbit and classification ==
Wright orbits the Sun at a distance of 1.5–1.9 AU once every 2 years and 3 months (816 days). Its orbit has an eccentricity of 0.11 and an inclination of 21° with respect to the ecliptic. As no precoveries were taken and no previous identifications were made, Wright's observation arc begins with its official discovery observation at Mount Hamilton in 1947.

== Physical characteristics ==
=== Spectral type and mineralogy ===
In the SMASS taxonomic system, Wright is an Sl-type, which transitions between the common stony S-type and the less common L-type asteroids. In the Tholen classification, this asteroid could not be assigned to a specific type. Its spectrum was unusual and noisy and resembled that of an A-type asteroid.

In 2012, Wright was observed in the near-infrared using the SpeX instrument of the NASA Infrared Telescope Facility on Mauna Kea, Hawaii. The spectral measurement indicate that Wright is not an olivine-rich A-type, but rather similar to the ordinary chondrites, with the common H chondrite as the most likely meteorite analogue for the asteroid's composition, as the spectra strongly indicate the presence of rock-forming pyroxenes minerals. The team of astronomers also characterized Wright as an Sw class asteroid using the Bus–DeMeo taxonomic system.

=== Diameter and albedo ===
According to the surveys carried out by the Infrared Astronomical Satellite IRAS and the Japanese Akari satellite, the asteroid measures 5.17 and 6.35 kilometers in diameter and its surface has an albedo of 0.20 and 0.32, respectively. The Collaborative Asteroid Lightcurve Link agrees with the results obtained by IRAS.

=== Photometry ===
In July 2005, a rotational lightcurve of Wright was obtained by astronomers Reiner Stoss, Jaime Nomen, Salvador Sánchez and Raoul Behrend at the Mallorca Observatory, Spain. Lightcurve analysis gave a well-defined rotation period of 5.2896 hours with a brightness variation of 0.61 magnitude (U=3).

In July 2014, another, concurring lightcurve with a period of 5.28796 hours and an amplitude of 0.53 was obtained by Robert Stephens at the Trojan Station of the Center for Solar System Studies (U81) in Landers, southern California.

== Naming ==
This minor planet was named in memory of American astronomer William Hammond Wright (1871–1959), staff member and later director of the discovering Lick Observatory until 1942. A pioneer in astrophysics, his large, wide-field 20-inch Carnegie double astrograph built for the observatory's proper motion survey (first light in 1941), was using distant galaxies ("spiral nebulae") as object references. During this survey, many comets and asteroids were discovered as a by-product. The official naming citation was published by the Minor Planet Center on 20 February 1976 (M.P.C. 3934). Wright is also honored by the Martian and lunar craters Wright.
