= William Hammond Wright =

American astronomer

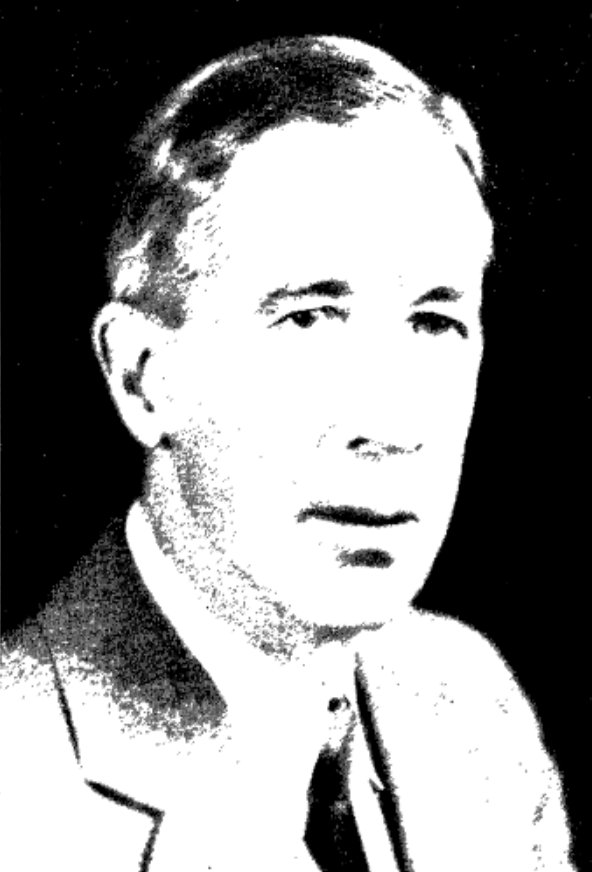
- Born: November 4, 1871; San Francisco, California
- Died: May 16, 1959 (aged 87); San Jose, California
- Education: B.S. (1893)
- Alma mater: University of California
- Spouse: Elna Leib (m. 1901)
- Parents: Selden Stuart Wright (father); Joanna Shaw (mother)
- Awards: Henry Draper Medal (1928); Janssen Medal (1928); Gold Medal of the Royal Astronomical Society (1938)
- Scientific career
- Fields: Astronomy
- Institutions: Lick Observatory

William Hammond Wright (November 4, 1871 – May 16, 1959) was an American astronomer and the director of the Lick Observatory from 1935 until 1942.

Wright was born in San Francisco. After graduating in 1893 from the University of California, he became Assistant Astronomer at Lick Observatory. From 1903 to 1906 he worked on establishing the "Southern station" of the observatory at Cerro San Cristobal near Santiago de Chile. It only took him 6 months to start with observations from this new site, and he recorded a large series of radial velocity measurements of stars in the southern sky. In 1908 he was promoted to Astronomer. From 1918 to 1919 he was stationed at Aberdeen Proving Ground working for the ordnance section of the United States Army. He then returned to the Lick Observatory and worked there until his retirement.

He is most famous for his work on radial velocity of stars in our galaxy, and his work with his own version of the spectrograph that he designed himself. He obtained a spectra of novas and nebulae. In 1924 he made photographic observations of Mars in multiple wave lengths. From these pictures he concluded that its atmosphere was about 60 miles (100 km) deep.

Wright was elected to the United States National Academy of Sciences in 1922 and the American Philosophical Society in 1935. In 1928 Wright received the Henry Draper Medal from the National Academy of Sciences, and in 1938 the Gold Medal of the Royal Astronomical Society. The Martian crater Wright and the minor planet 1747 Wright are named after him. The lunar crater Wright is co-named in his honour.
