= Lorentz Eichstadt =

German mathematician and astronomer (1596–1660)

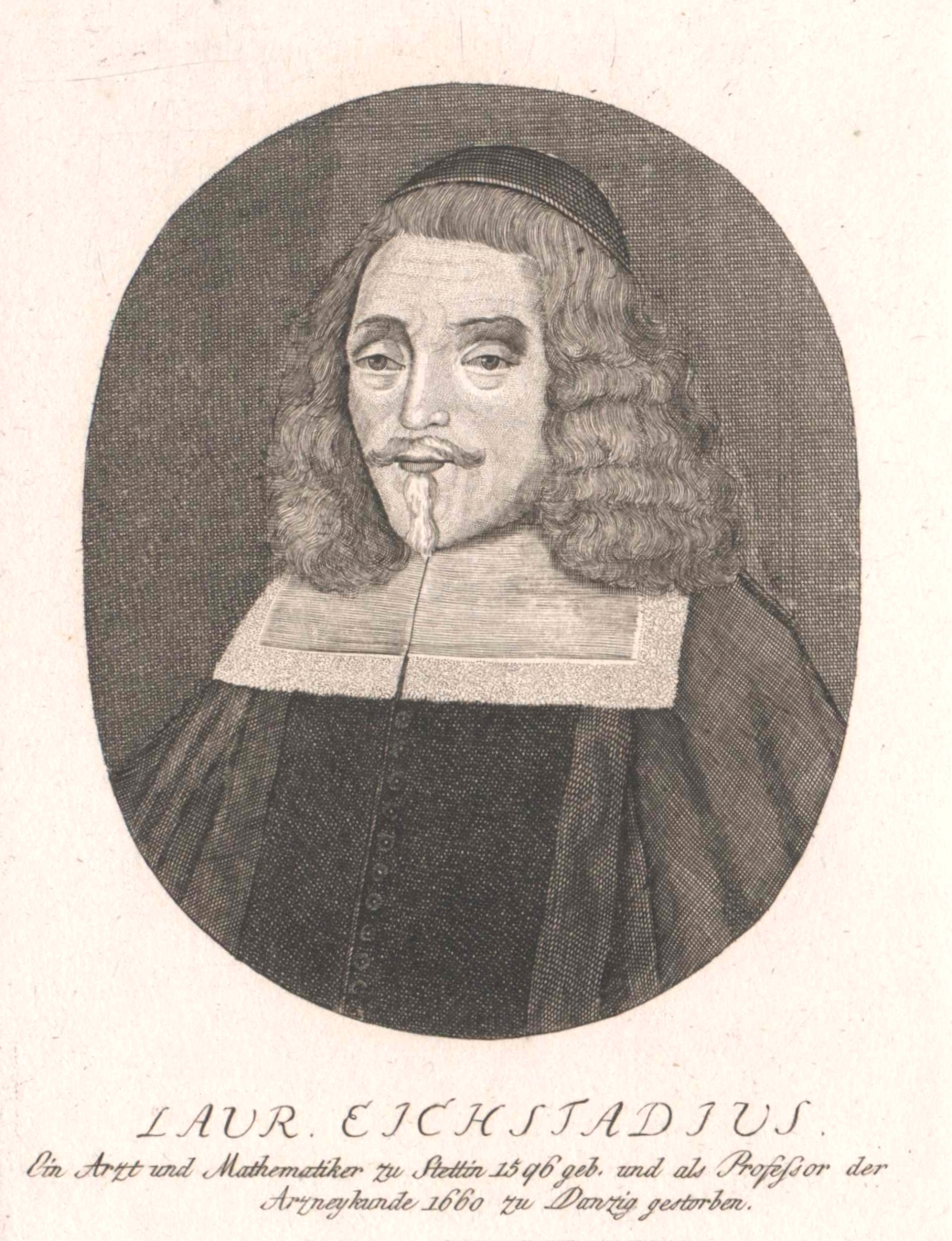
Lorentz Eichstadt.

Lorentz Eichstadt (10 August 1596 – 8 June 1660) was a German mathematician and astronomer. He was a doctor of medicine in Szczecin in Pomerania and taught medicine and mathematics in Danzig.

The lunar crater Eichstadt is named after him.
