= Baade (crater) =

Lunar crater

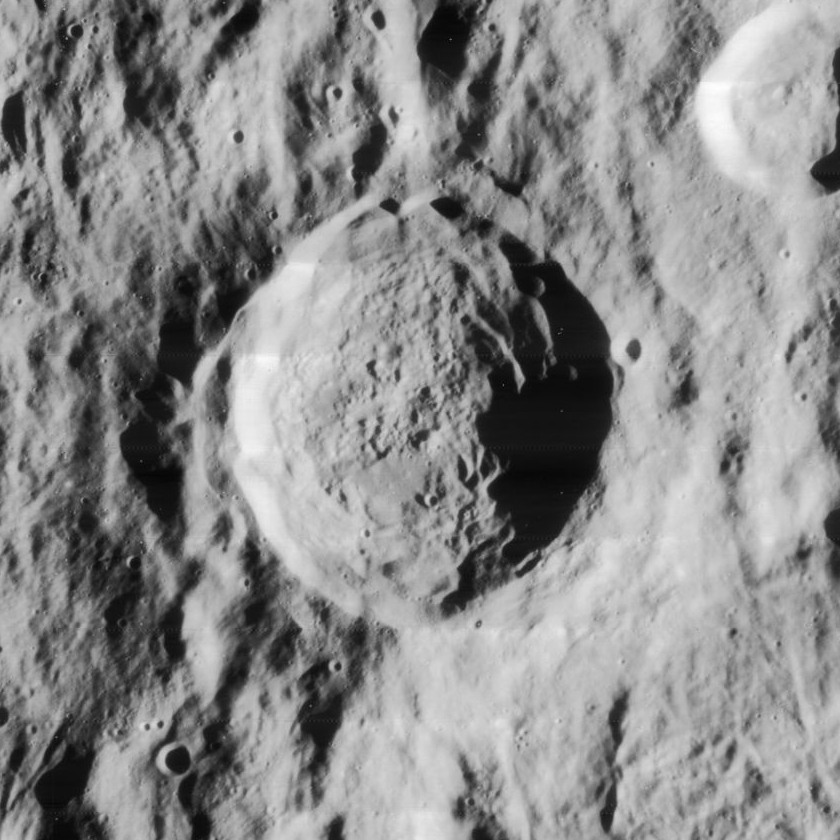
- Lunar Orbiter 4 image
- Coordinates: 44.8°S 81.8°W
- Diameter: 55 km
- Depth: Unknown
- Colongitude: 83° at sunrise
- Formation: Late Imbrian
- Eponym: Walter Baade

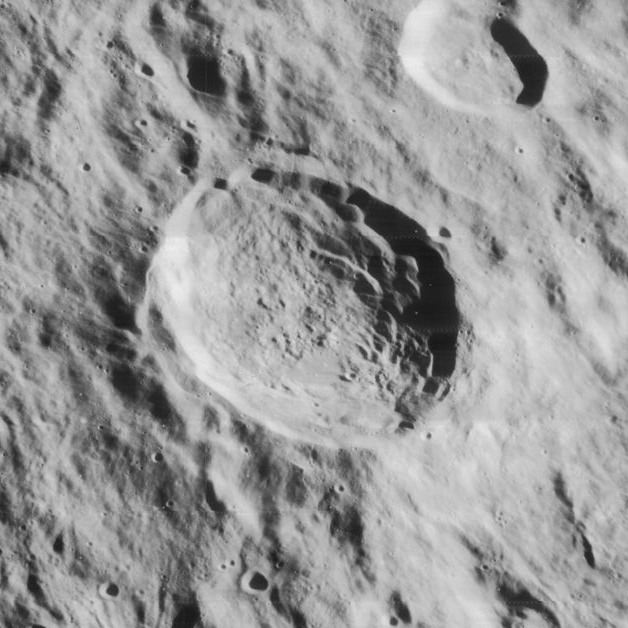
Oblique Lunar Orbiter 4 image with slightly different lighting

Baade is a lunar impact crater that is located near the southwest limb of the Moon on the near side, to the southwest of the enormous Mare Orientale impact basin. It lies within the Mendel-Rydberg Basin, a 630 km wide impact basin of Nectarian age. The area to the east of the Baade crater forms the junction between the 288-km-long Vallis Bouvard to the north and the narrower, 207-km-long Vallis Baade to the south-southeast. Both valleys radiate away from the Mare Orientale basin to the north.

This formation dates to the Late Imbrian period of the lunar geologic timescale. The outer wall of Baade remains sharp-edged, with little appearance of erosion due to subsequent impacts. The rim is generally circular, with some terracing of the inner wall. The crater interior is rough and irregular, with a generally bowl-shaped appearance that lacks a sharply defined floor. There is no central peak at the midpoint of the interior, and no craterlets of note mark the surface.

This crater is named after German-American astronomer Walter Baade (1893–1960). Its designation was officially adopted by the International Astronomical Union in 1964. The name was introduced into lunar nomenclature by David W. G. Arthur and Ewen Whitaker, and first appeared in the Rectified Lunar Atlas (1963).
