= Vallis Bouvard =

Lunar surface depression

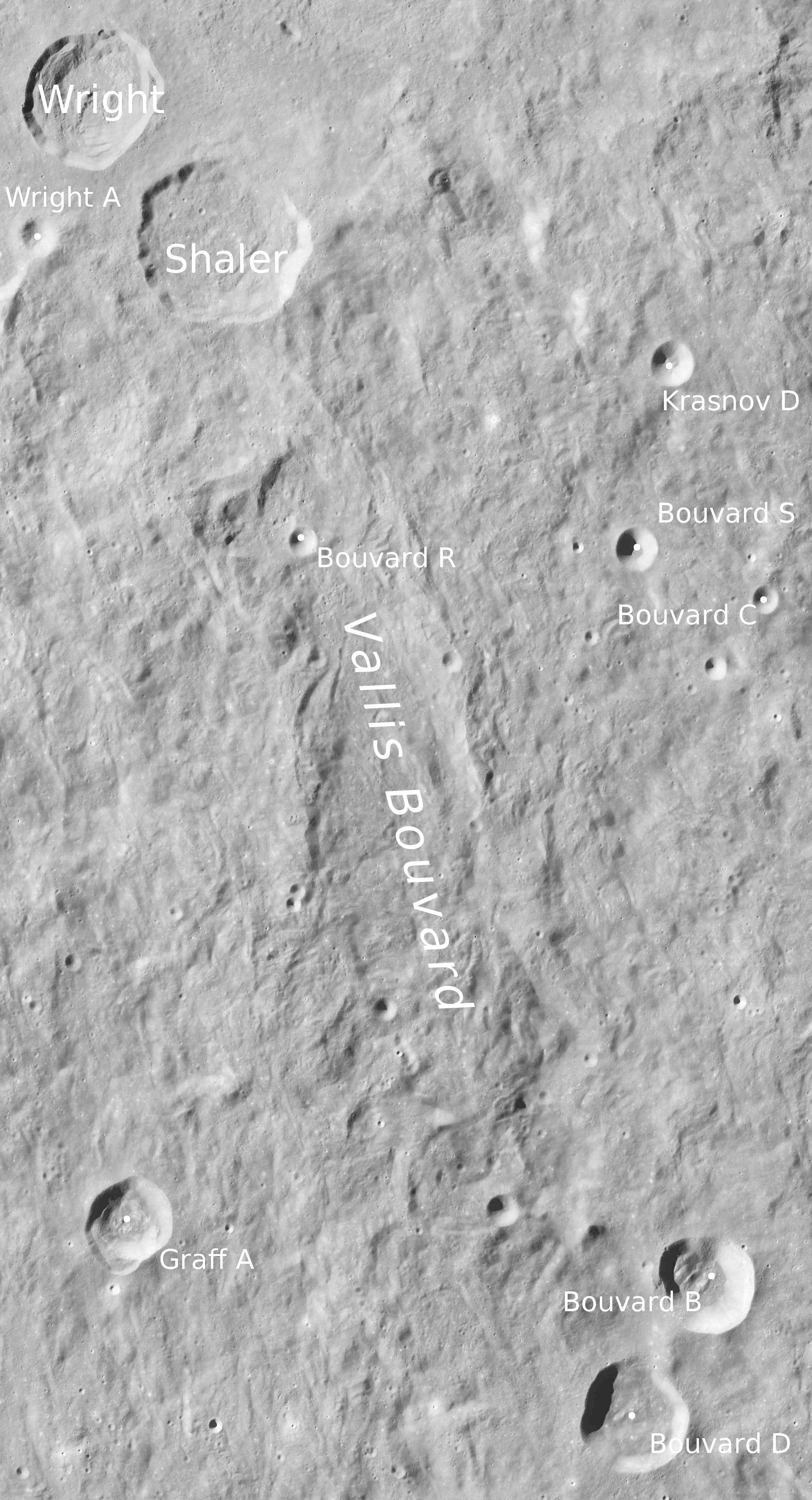
Vallis Bouvard with craters Shaler and Wright

Vallis Bouvard is a 284-km-long valley on the Moon, centered at 38.3°S 83.1°W. It begins at the southern rim of the crater Shaler, and winds its way to the south-southeast towards Baade. This is one of several such valleys that radiate away from the southeast edge of the Mare Orientale circular impact basin, the other two being Vallis Inghirami and Vallis Baade. It was formed by a secondary crater chain. The valley was named after Alexis Bouvard.
