= Vallis Baade =

Lunar surface depression

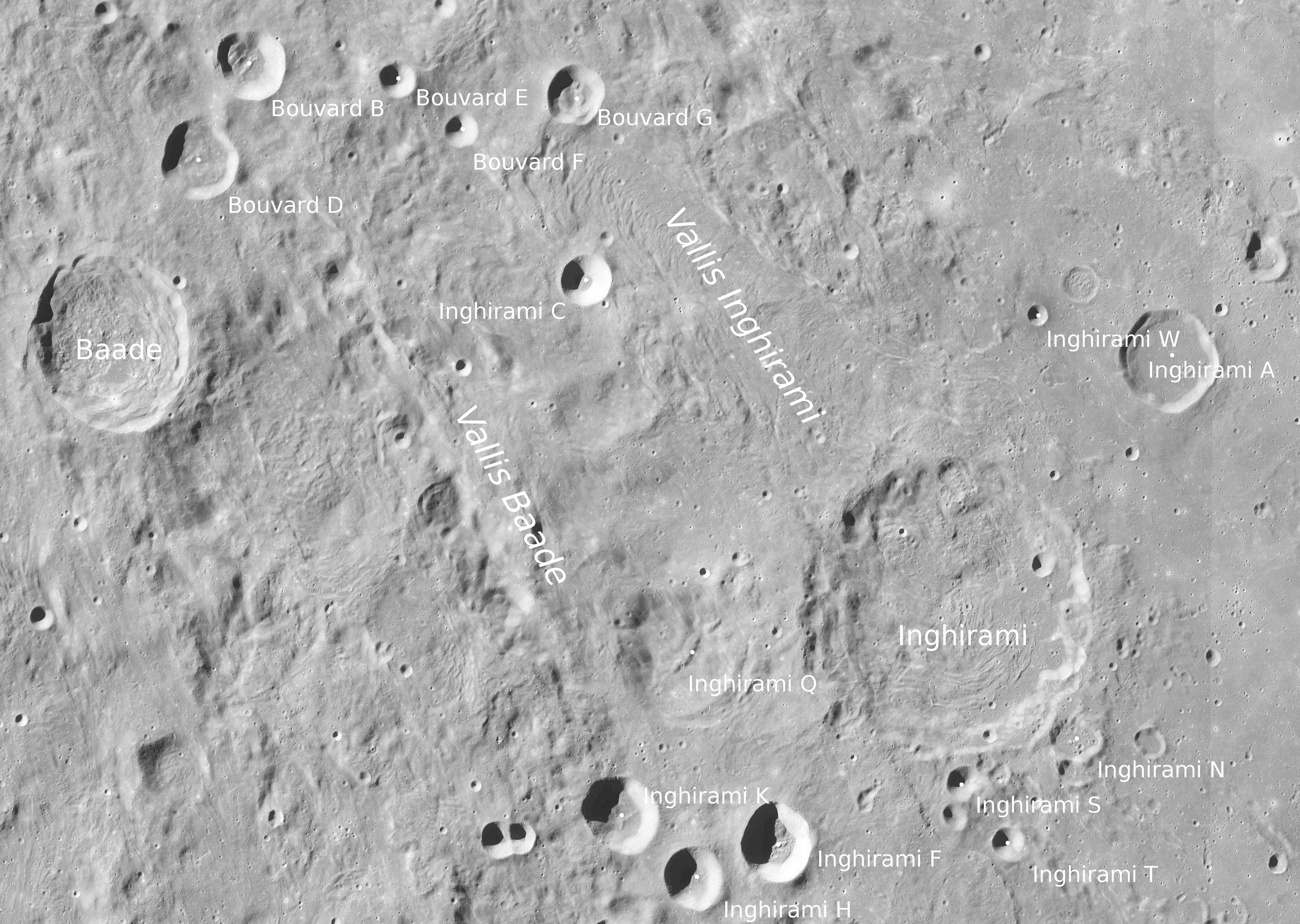

Vallis Baade is a 203 km long sinuous valley on the Moon running south-southeast from the crater Baade and centered at 45.9°S 76.2°W (south of the Montes Cordillera). It has the same namesake as the crater, the German astronomer Walter Baade.

This is one of several valleys that radiate away from the southeast edge of the Mare Orientale circular impact basin, the other two being Vallis Inghirami and Vallis Bouvard.
