= Lacus Autumni =

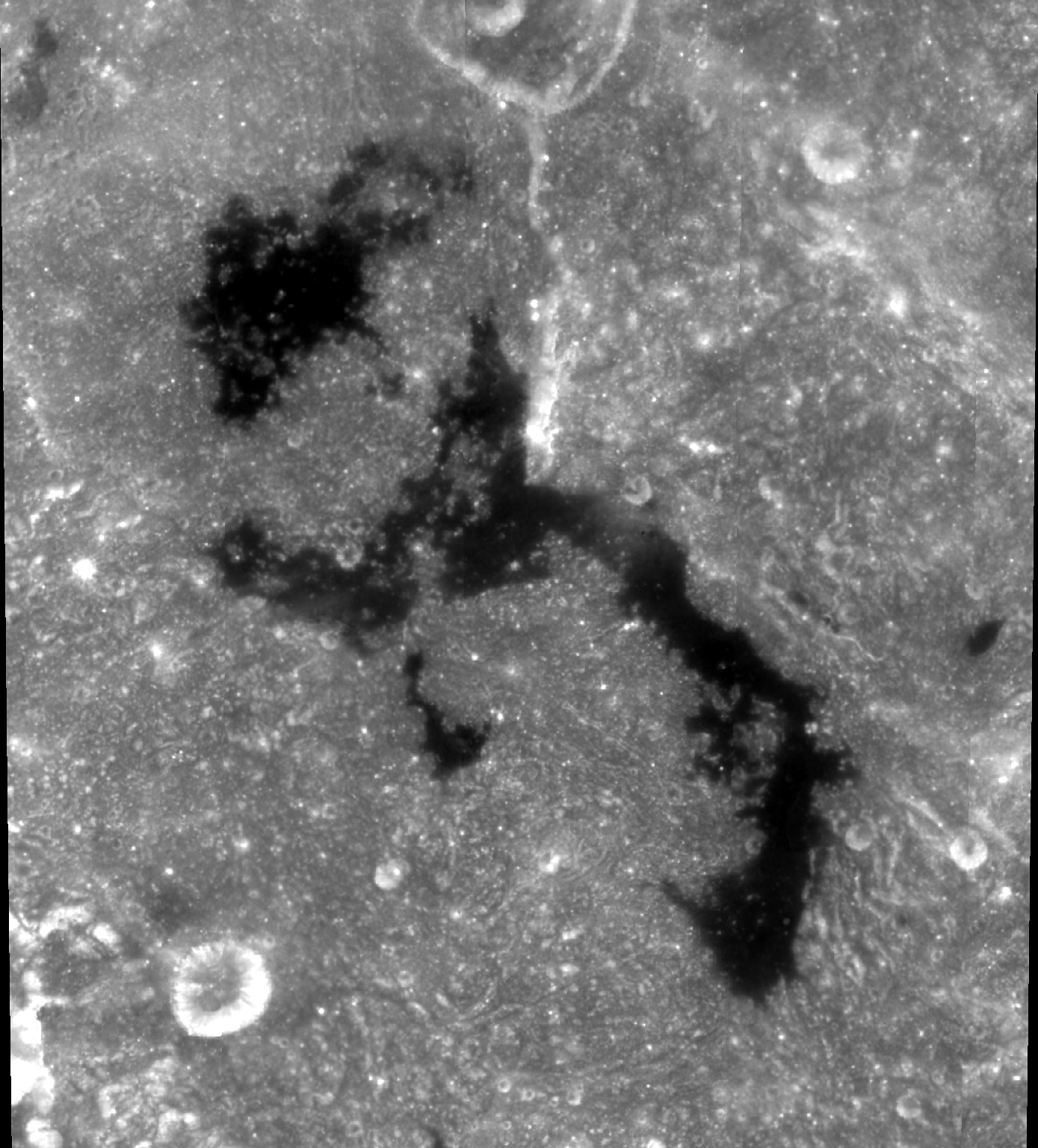
- Coordinates: 9.9°S 83.9°W
- Diameter: 183 km
- Eponym: Lake of Autumn

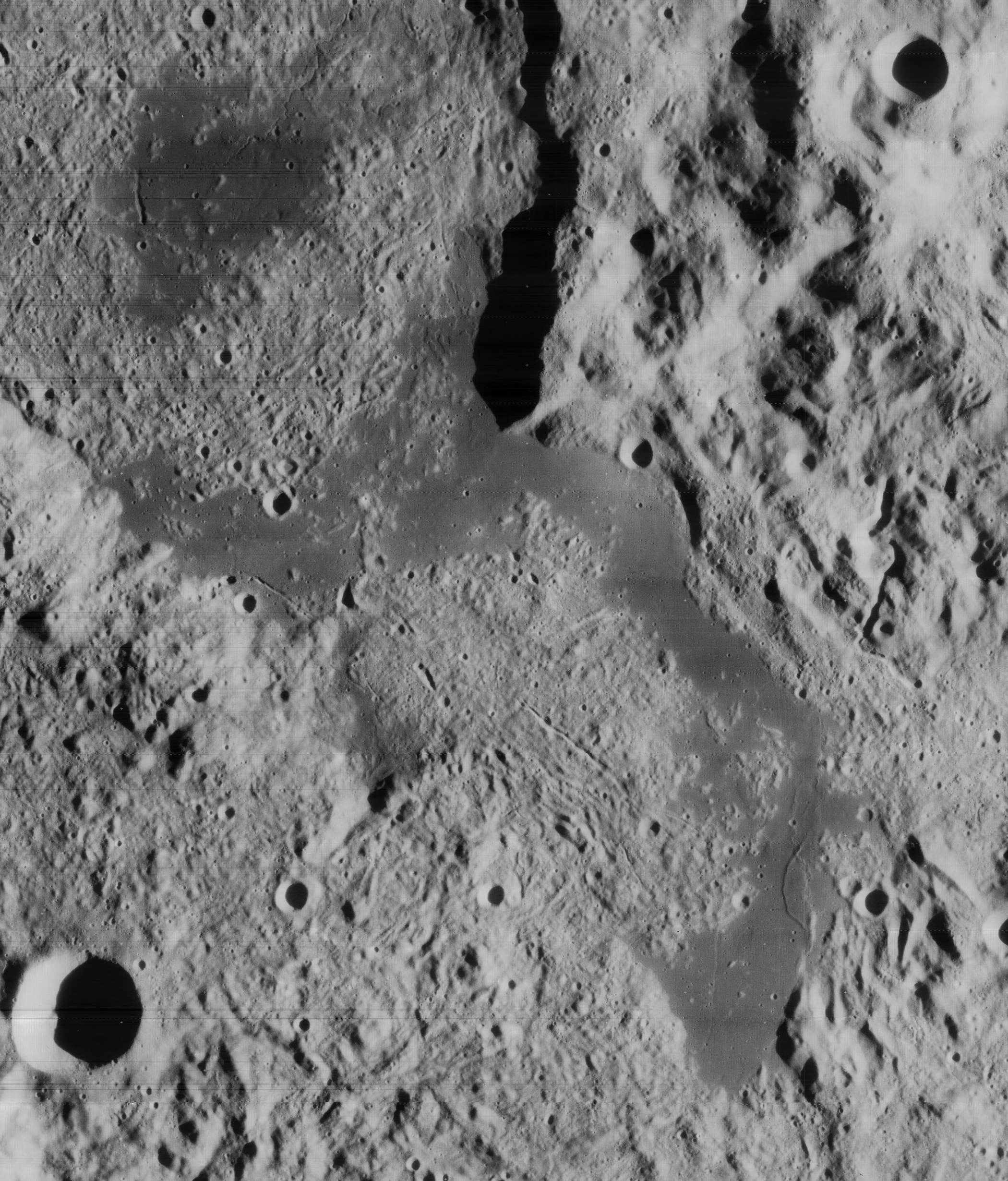
Lunar Orbiter 4 image

Lacus Autumni (Latin autumnī, "Lake of Autumn") is a region of lunar mare that lies near the western limb of the Moon. Along this side of the lunar surface is a huge impact basin centered on the Mare Orientale. Two concentric mountain rings surround the Orientale mare, the inner ring being named Montes Rook and an outer ring called the Montes Cordillera. Lacus Autumni lies in the northeastern quadrant of the gap between these two mountain rings. This section of the lunar surface is difficult to observe directly from the Earth.

The selenographic coordinates of the center of the mare are 9.9° S, 83.9° W. It is approximately 195 kilometres (120 mi) long and trends from the southeast to the northwest, reaching a maximum width of 90–100 kilometres (55–60 mi). The irregular appearance results from the lunar basalt emerging from the surface to fill in low areas between hummocky hills.

The name of the feature was approved by the IAU in 1970.
