= Montes Cordillera =

Mountain range on the Moon

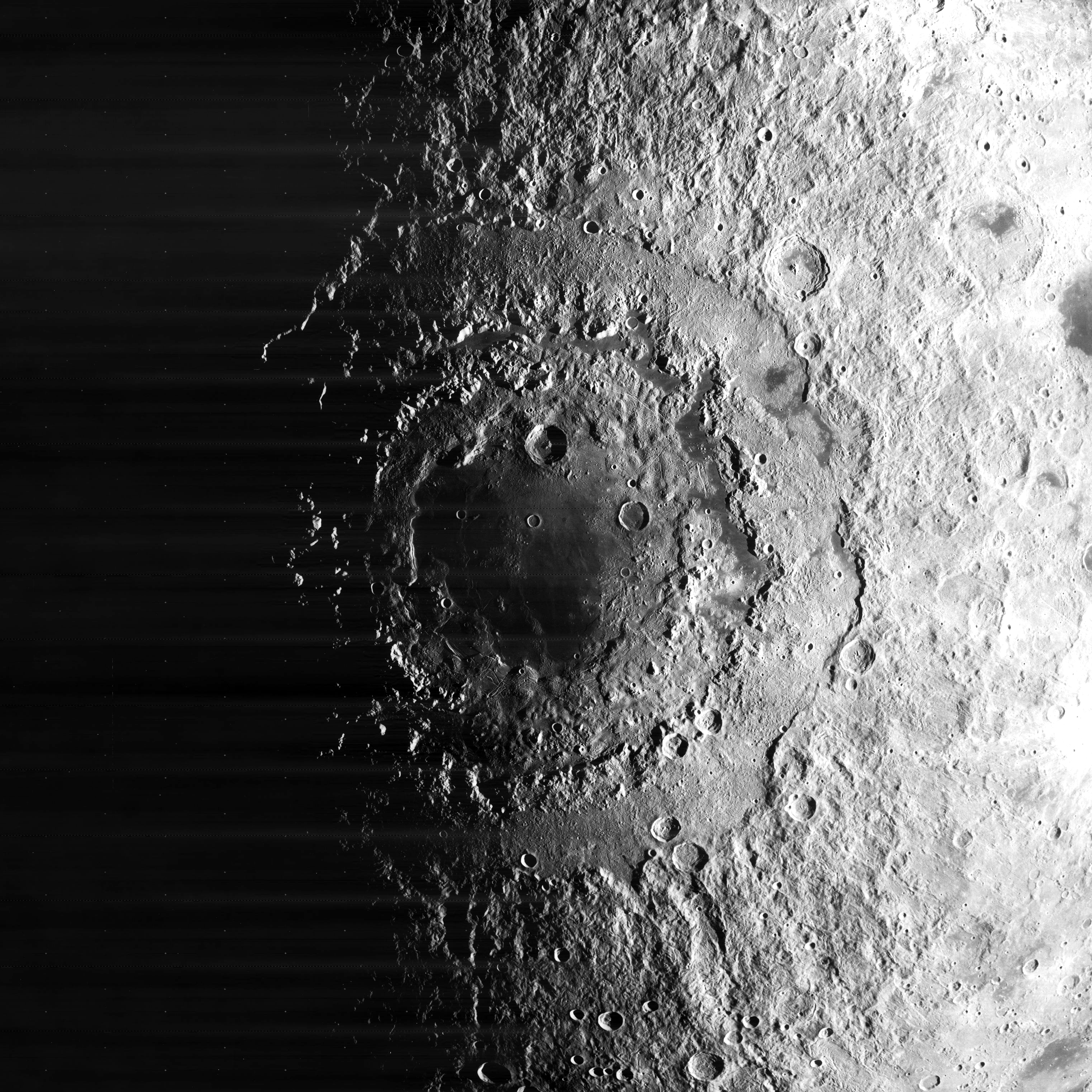
- 1967 photograph of the Mare Orientale basin made by NASA's Lunar Orbiter 4.

Highest point
- Listing: Lunar mountains
- Coordinates: 17.5°S 81.6°W

Geography
- Location: the Moon

Montes Cordillera is a mountain range on the Moon. This feature forms the outer ring of peaks surrounding the Mare Orientale impact basin, with the inner ring formed by the Montes Rook. The center of the range is located at selenographic coordinates 17.5° S, 81.6° W, and the diameter spans 574 km (357 mi).

This range lies across the Moon’s southwestern limb, meaning it is observed from the side when viewed from Earth. The western extreme extends to approximately 116° W, placing it on the far side of the Moon. The northern portion lies just south of the lunar equator, while the southern extent reaches about 38° S. The inner side of the range consists of an uneven, ring-shaped plain surrounding Montes Rook, while the outer side features a wide blanket of ejecta created during the formation of Mare Orientale. These ejecta have created ridges and valleys radiating from the mare and have significantly altered nearby pre-existing craters.

The Moon's highest mountain (though not its tallest in relative height) is located in the southwestern section of Montes Cordillera, with a summit elevation of 9.46 km and it rises about 3.5 km above its base.

Along the inner side of the range, to the northeast, lies a small lunar mare feature called Lacus Autumni, or Autumn Lake. To the northeast of the range are the craters Schlüter and Hartwig. Hartwig has been heavily modified by ejecta from Mare Orientale, whereas Schlüter is a younger crater, formed after this impact.

The southeastern section of Montes Cordillera contains the craters Krasnov and Shaler. To the southeast of Shaler is a radial valley named Vallis Bouvard. Further to the south and east are two more radial valleys: Vallis Baade and Vallis Inghirami. Another similar radial valley, Vallis Bohr, lies to the north of Montes Cordillera, just west of the crater Bohr.

The name Cordillera means a chain of mountains in the Spanish language.
