= André Lallemand =

French astronomer and director

André Lallemand (French pronunciation: [ɑ̃dʁe lalmɑ̃]; September 29, 1904 – March 24, 1978) was a French astronomer and director of the Institut d'Astrophysique de Paris.

Lallemand made important contributions to the development of photomultipliers for astronomical use and the "electronic telescope" (or Lallemand camera). He was awarded the Lalande Prize of the French Academy of Sciences in 1938 and the Eddington Medal of the Royal Astronomical Society in 1962 for his work.

Lallemand was the President of the Société astronomique de France (SAF), the French astronomical society, from 1960-1962.

The crater Lallemand on the Moon is named in his honor, and the French Academy of Sciences has a biennial award for work in astronomy called the "Prix Lallemand".
