= Lacus Veris =

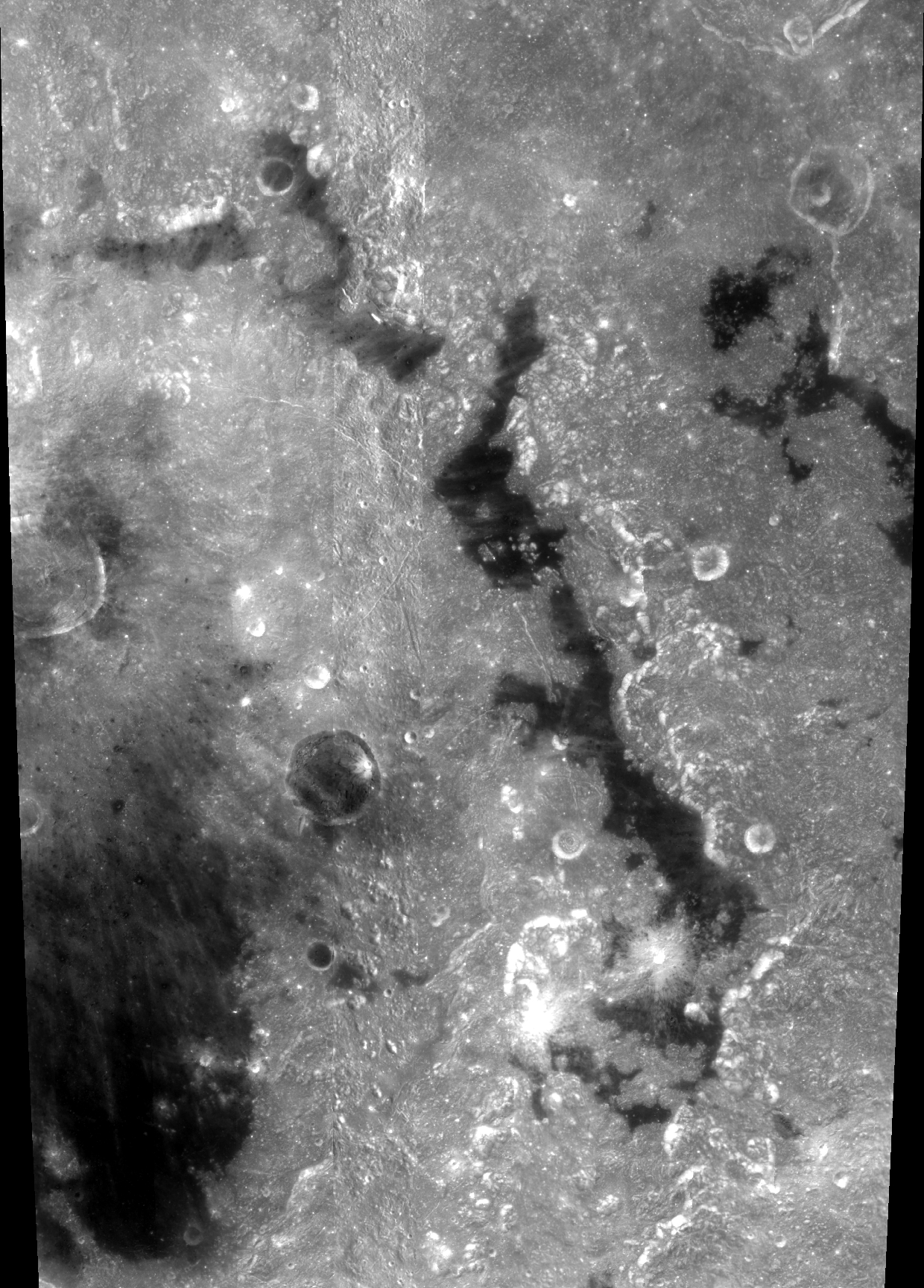
- Clementine mosaic
- Coordinates: 16.5°S 86.1°W
- Diameter: 396 km
- Eponym: Lake of Spring

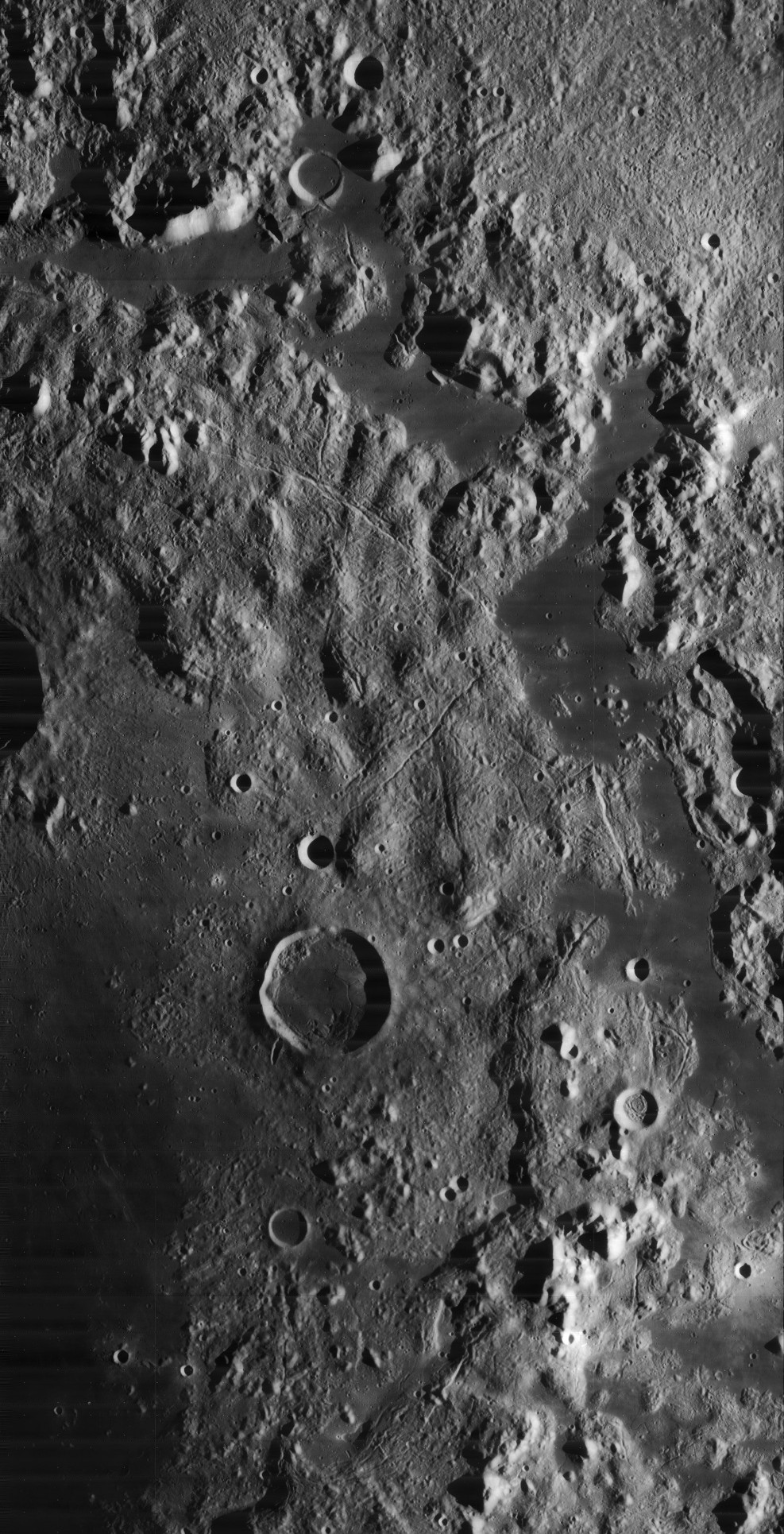
Lunar Orbiter 4 image

Lacus Veris (Latin vēris, "Lake of Spring") is a small lunar mare on the Moon. In selenographic coordinates, the mare centered at 16.5° S, 86.1° W and is approximately 396 km long. The mare extends along an irregular 90° arc from east to north that is centered on the Mare Orientale, covering an area of about 12,000 km^{2}. Author Eric Burgess proposed this mare as the location of a future crewed lunar base, citing a 1989 study performed at the NASA Johnson Space Center.

This small, roughly crescent-shaped mare region lies between the ring-shaped Inner and Outer Rook mountains that form part of the Orientale impact basin. It lies in a topographic lowland about 1 km below the surrounding peaks. Based on data collected during the Lunar Orbiter missions and from Earth-based telescopes, the mare includes some material from the surrounding highlands. The density of crater impacts indicates that this mare is an estimated 3.5 billion years old, and it finished forming roughly 340 million years after the impact that created the Oriental basin.

The mare contains eleven sinuous rilles formed from lava tubes and channels, with lengths ranging from 4 to 51 km. Many of these rilles begin in the Rook mountains and flow to the base of the mountainous scarp. There are also several shield volcano formations, each with a diameter of less than 10 km. The geological formations and the lack of collapse depressions suggest that the mare was formed by thin lava flow through tubes, rather than through basalt flooding by fissure eruptions.

== See also ==
- Volcanism on the Moon
