= Libration =

Apparent oscillation of a minor body seen from the major body it orbits

The lunar phases and librations in 2019 in the Northern Hemisphere at hourly intervals, with music, titles, and supplemental graphics

Simulated views of the Moon over one month, demonstrating librations in latitude and longitude. Also visible are the different phases, and the variation in visual size caused by the variable distance from the Earth.

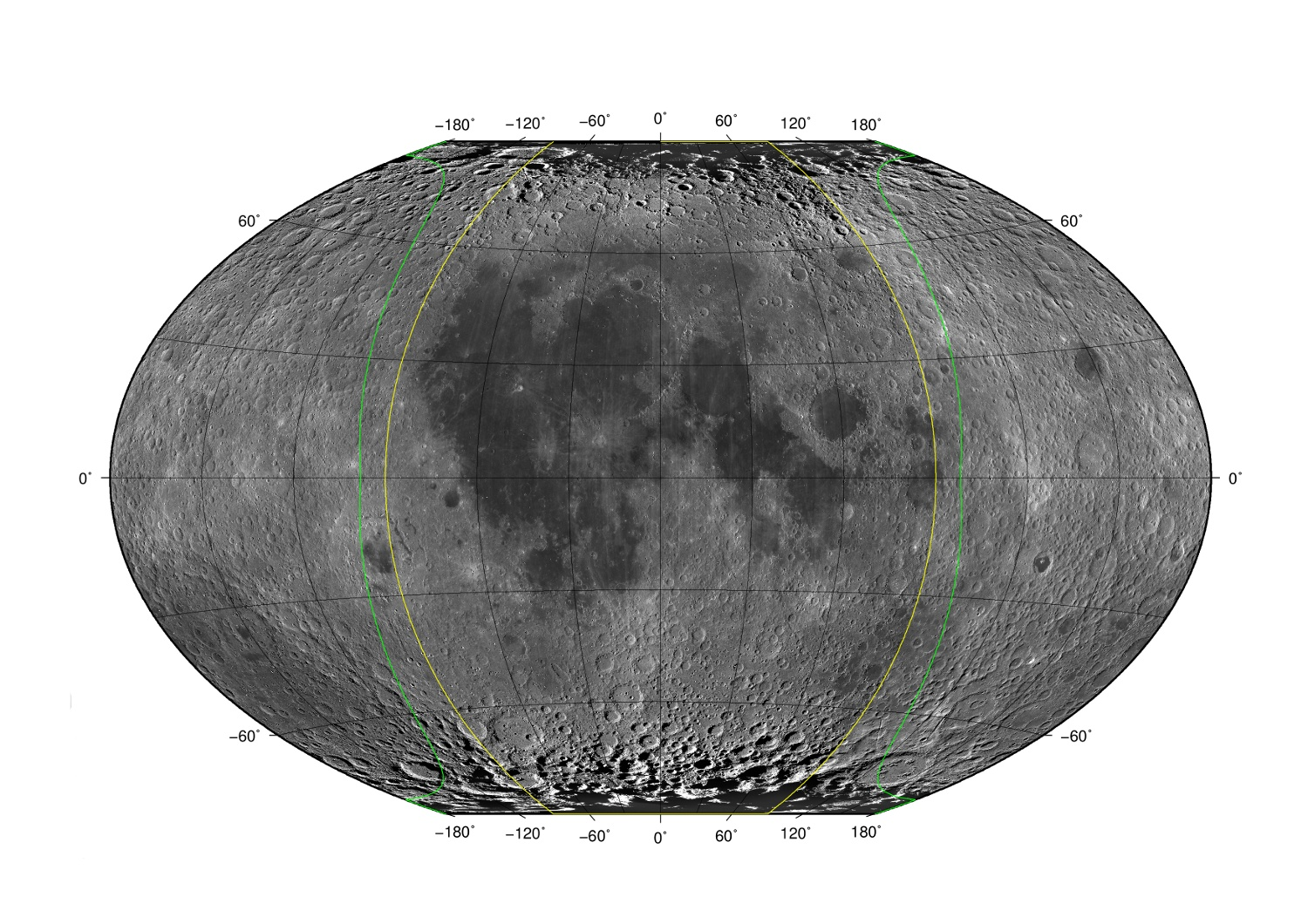
Theoretical extent of visible lunar surface (in green) due to libration, compared to the extent of the visible lunar surface without libration (in yellow). The projection is the Winkel Tripel projection. Mare Orientale, just outside the yellow region, is brought into visibility from Earth by libration.

In lunar astronomy, libration is the cyclic variation in the apparent position of the Moon that is perceived by observers on the Earth and caused by changes between the orbital and rotational planes of the Moon. It causes an observer to see slightly different hemispheres of the surface at different times. It is similar in both cause and effect to the changes in the Moon's apparent size because of changes in distance. It is caused by three mechanisms detailed below, two of which cause a relatively tiny physical libration by means of tidal forces exerted by the Earth. Such true librations are known as well for other moons with locked rotation.

The quite different phenomenon of a trojan asteroid's oscillation has been called Trojan libration, and Trojan libration point means Lagrangian point.

== Lunar libration ==
Animation showing the changing position of the Moon due to libration, in relation to a fictitious red position on perfectly circular orbit.

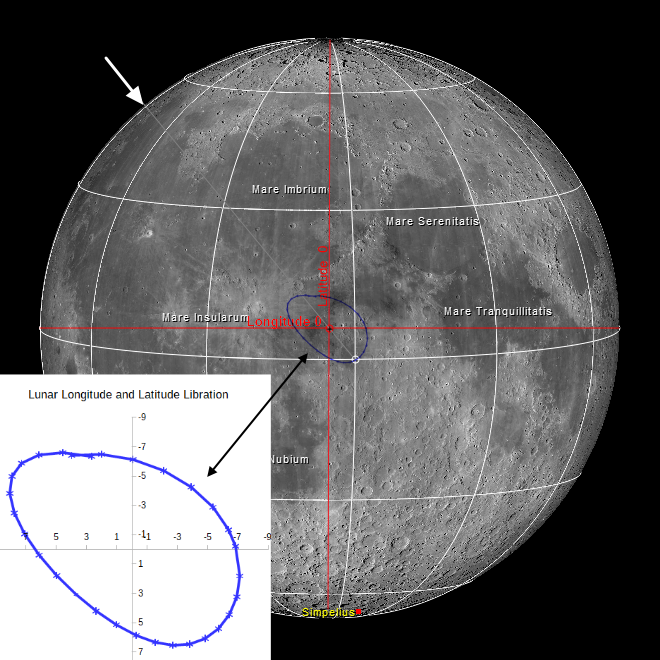
A path longitudal and latitudal libration takes, as of the central point of the near side of the Moon

The Moon keeps one of its hemispheres facing the Earth because of tidal locking. Therefore, the first view of the far side of the Moon was not possible until the Soviet probe Luna 3 reached the Moon on October 7, 1959, and further lunar exploration by the United States and the Soviet Union. This simple picture is only approximately true since over time, slightly more than half (about 59% in total) of the Moon's surface is seen from Earth because of libration.

Lunar librations arise in broadly two ways—firstly, geometrical librations comprising changes in observational perspective because of the non-circular inclined orbit of the Moon around Earth as well as the Moon's own orientation in orbit and secondly, physical librations which involve actual pendulum-like nodding and wobbling of the Moon around its equilibrium position. Geometrical libration includes optical, parallax and diurnal types, while physical libration includes forced and free types.

The following are the three types of lunar geometrical libration:

1. Optical libration, observed from a point on Earth, it is the combination of longitudinal and latitudinal libration producing a movement of the sub-Earth point and a wobbling view between the temporarily visible parts of the Moon during a lunar orbit. The sub-Earth point is the apparent center of the Moon's disk and the location on the Moon where the Earth is directly overhead. This type of libration is because the orbiting motion of the Moon is not steady—at some times it advances faster than average and some times it is slower. This is not to be confused with the change of Moon's apparent size because of changing distance between Moon and the Earth during the Moon's elliptic orbit, or with the "parallax" type—caused by change of positional angle because of change in position of the Moon's tilted axis, or with the "diurnal" type observed swinging motion of the Moon because of relative position of the Earth's tilted axis vis-a-vis an orbit of the Moon.
  - Libration in longitude results from the eccentricity of the orbit of the Moon around the Earth; the Moon's rotation sometimes leads and sometimes lags its orbital position. The lunar libration in longitude was discovered by Johannes Hevelius in 1648. It can reach 7°54′ in amplitude. Longitudinal libration allows an observer on Earth to view at times further into the Moon's west and east respectively at different phases of the Moon's orbit.
    Longitudal libration, illustrating the extent of visibility of the lunar far side
  - Libration in latitude results from the Moon's axial tilt (about 6.7°) between its rotation axis and orbital axis around Earth. This is analogous to how Earth's seasons arise from its axial tilt (about 23.4°) between its rotation axis and orbital axis about the Sun. Galileo Galilei is sometimes credited with the discovery of the lunar libration in latitude in 1632 although Thomas Harriot or William Gilbert might have done so before. Note Cassini's laws. It can reach 6°50′ in amplitude. The 6.7° depends on the orbit inclination of 5.15° and the negative equatorial tilt of 1.54°. Latitudinal libration allows an observer on Earth to view beyond the Moon's north pole and south pole at different phases of the Moon's orbit.
    Latitudal libration, illustrating the extent of visibility of the lunar polar regions from Earth
2. Parallax libration are the differences observed when viewing from different locations at the same time; it depends on both the longitude and latitude of the locations on Earth from which the Moon is observed.
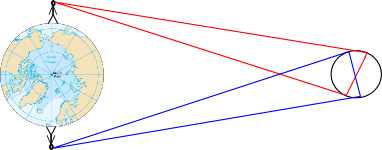
  Longitudal parallax libration
3. Diurnal libration is the small daily libration and oscillation observed due to Earth's rotation, because during the time when the Moon is visible on any day, the rotation of the Earth carries an observer from one side (dusk) to the other side (dawn) allowing the observer to look first around one side of the Moon and then around the other—since the observer is on the Earth's surface, and not at its center, which shifts the line of view and slightly increases the observable area, though, this reaches less than 1° in amplitude.
  Diurnal libration of the Moon as actually observed from the beginning to the end of a single night. The two angles are created by the different position of the observer with respect to the Moon because of the rotation of the Earth over a few hours.

Physical libration is the oscillation of orientation in space about uniform rotation and precession. There are physical librations about all three axes. The sizes are roughly 100 seconds of arc. As seen from the Earth, this amounts to less than 1 second of arc. Forced physical librations can be predicted given the orbit and shape of the Moon. The periods of free physical librations can also be predicted, but their amplitudes and phases cannot be predicted.

== Physical libration ==
Also called real libration, as opposed to the optical libration of longitudinal, latitudinal and diurnal types, the orientation of the Moon exhibits small oscillations of the pole direction in space and rotation about the pole.

This libration can be differentiated between forced and free libration. Forced libration is caused by the forces exerted during the Moon's orbit around the Earth and the Sun, and free libration represents oscillations that occur over longer time periods.

=== Forced physical libration ===
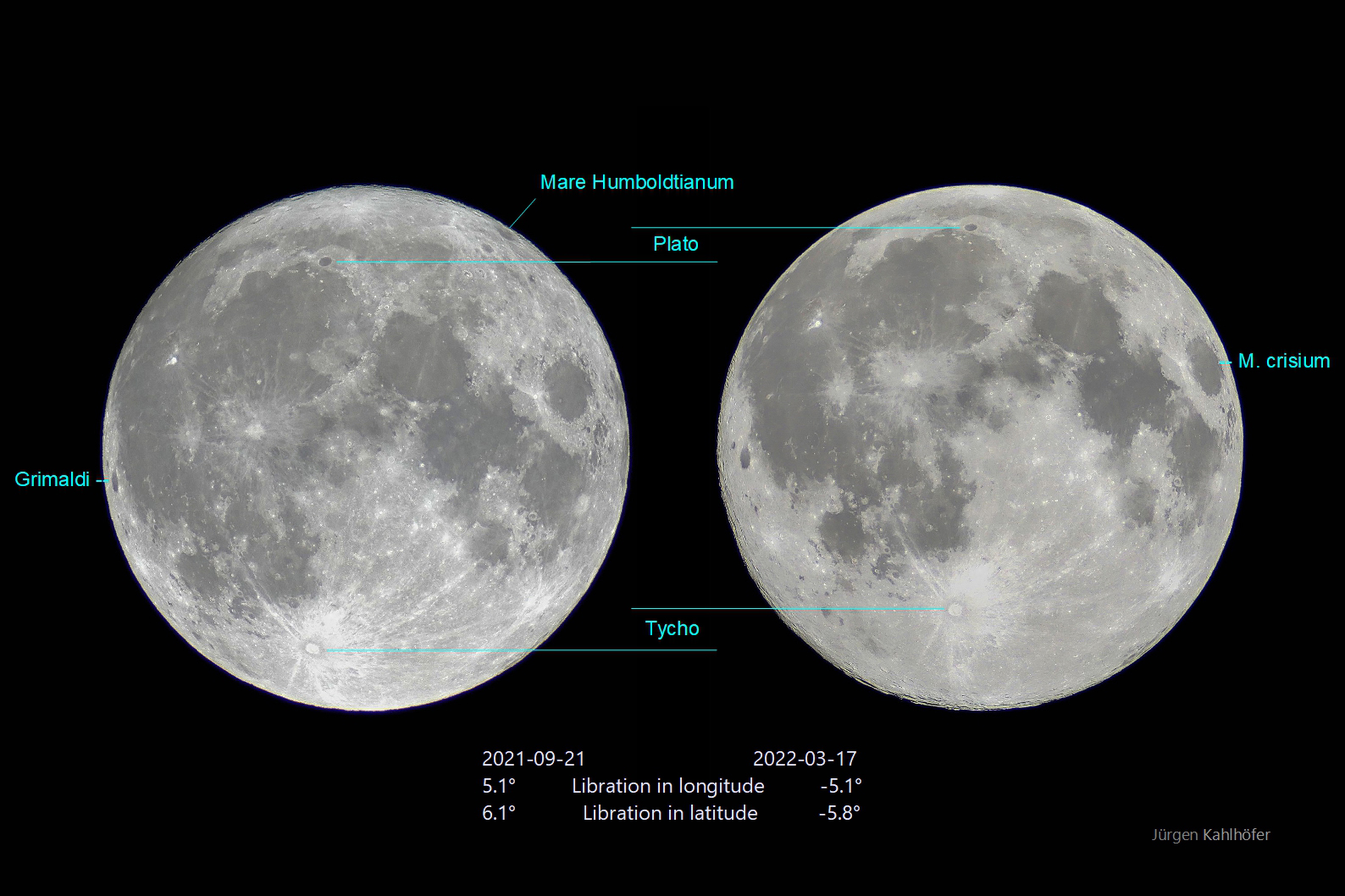
Full moon at opposite librations

Cassini's laws state the following:

1. The Moon rotates uniformly about its polar axis keeping one side toward the Earth.
2. The Moon's equator plane is tilted with respect to the ecliptic plane and it precesses uniformly along the ecliptic plane.
3. The descending node of the equator on the ecliptic matches the ascending node of the orbit plane.

In addition to uniform rotation and uniform precession of the equator plane, the Moon has small oscillations of orientation in space about all three axes. These oscillations are called physical librations. Apart from the 1.5427° tilt between equator and ecliptic, the oscillations are approximately ±100 seconds of arc in size. These oscillations can be expressed with trigonometric series that depend on the lunar moments of inertia A < B < C. The sensitive combinations are β = (C – A)/B and γ = (B – A)/C. The oscillation about the polar axis is most sensitive to γ and the 2-dimensional direction of the pole, including the 1.5427° tilt, is most sensitive to β. Consequently, accurate measurements of the physical librations provide accurate determinations of β = 6.31×10^{−4} and γ = 2.28×10^{−4}.

The placement of three retroreflectors on the Moon by the Lunar Laser Ranging experiment and two retroreflectors by Lunokhod rovers allowed accurate measurement of the physical librations by laser ranging to the Moon.

=== Free physical libration ===
A free physical libration is similar to the solution of the reduced equation for linear differential equations. The periods of the free librations can be calculated, but their amplitudes must be measured. Lunar Laser Ranging provides the determinations. The two largest free librations were discovered by O. Calame. Modern values are:

- 1.3 seconds of arc with a 1056-day (2.9-year) period for rotation about the polar axis,
- a 74.6-year elliptical wobble of the pole of size 8.18 × 3.31 arcseconds, and
- an 81-year rotation of the pole in space that is 0.03 seconds of arc in size.

The fluid core can cause a fourth mode with a period around four centuries. The free librations are expected to damp out in times very short compared to the age of the Moon. Consequently, their existence implies that there must be one or more stimulating mechanisms.

== See also ==
- Parallactic angle
