= Mare Orientale =

Lunar mare on the western border of the Moon's near and far sides

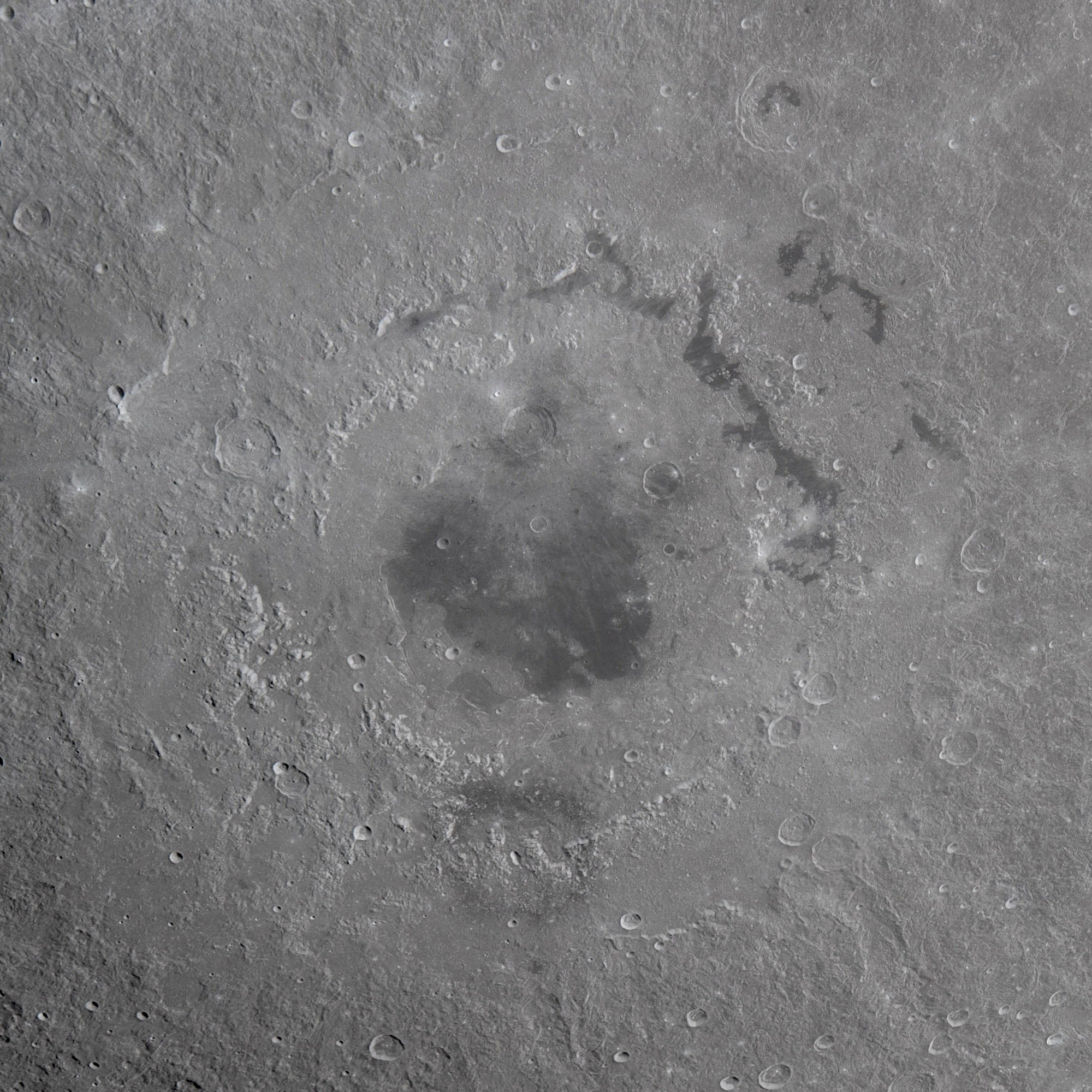
- 2026 Artemis II image
- Coordinates: 19.4°S 92.8°W
- Diameter: 294 km (183 mi)
- Eponym: Eastern Sea

Mare Orientale (/ˌɔːriənˈteɪli/; from Latin mare orientāle 'eastern sea') is a lunar mare. It is located on the western border of the near side and far side of the Moon, and is difficult to see from an Earthbound perspective. Images from spacecraft have revealed it to be one of the most striking large-scale lunar features, resembling a target ring bullseye.

== Geology ==
During the 1960s, rectified images of Mare Orientale by Gerard Kuiper at the Lunar and Planetary Laboratory gave rise to the notion of it being an impact crater. The structure, with the flat plain of the mare in the center, is about 900 kilometres (560 mi) across and was formed by the impact of an asteroid-sized object, possibly 64 km (40 mi) in diameter and travelling at 15 km/s (9.3 mi/s). Compared with most other lunar basins, Mare Orientale is less flooded by mare basalts, so that much of the basin structure is visible. The basalt in the central portion of the Orientale basin is probably less than 1 km (0.62 mi) in thickness which is much less than mare basins on the Earth-facing side of the Moon. The collision caused ripples in the lunar crust, resulting in the three concentric circular features. The innermost rings of this vast, multi-ringed crater are the inner and outer Montes Rook, and the outermost ring are the Montes Cordillera, 930 km (580 mi) in diameter. Outward from here, ejecta extend some 500 km (310 mi) from the foot of the mountains and form a rough surface with hummocks and with features radially aligned towards the center.

The Apollo program did not sample rocks from Mare Orientale, so its precise age is not known. However, it is the Moon's most recent impact basin, likely younger than the Imbrium Basin, which is about 3.85 billion years old, with an estimated age of around 3.7–3.8 billion years. The surrounding basin material is of the Lower Imbrian epoch with the mare material being of the Upper Imbrian epoch.

Global seismic shaking following the impact that created the basin has been credited with the levelling of almost all slopes steeper than 35° in layers of Imbrian age and older on the Moon.

Located at the antipode of Mare Orientale is Mare Marginis.

A mass concentration (mascon), or gravitational high, was identified in the center of Mare Orientale from Doppler tracking of the five Lunar Orbiter spacecraft in 1968. The mascon was confirmed and mapped at higher resolution with later orbiters such as Lunar Prospector and GRAIL.

== Discovery and name ==
Mare Orientale is difficult to observe from Earth, as it lies at the extreme western edge of the near side. All that can be seen are the rough mountain ranges—the Montes Rook and the Montes Cordillera—and some glimpses of the dark mare material beyond them. However, the Moon's libration means that on rare occasions Mare Orientale is turned slightly more toward the Earth, and becomes a little more discernible.

Although various astronomers had observed hints of the mare, it was first fully described by the German astronomer Julius Franz in his 1906 book Der Mond ("The Moon"). Franz also gave the mare its name, the "Eastern Sea", as it was located on what the convention at the time considered was the eastern side of the Moon as viewed from Earth, though it is the western side as viewed by an astronaut walking on the Moon. In 1961, however, the International Astronomical Union adopted the astronautic convention for East and West on the Moon and this limb became the western edge.

The first detailed study of the Mare Orientale was by Hugh Percy Wilkins, who called it "Lunar Mare X". Franz's discoveries were not well known, and in the 1976 edition of his book Guide to the Moon, Patrick Moore claims that he and Wilkins discovered and named Mare Orientale in 1946. However, Moore credits Franz as discoverer in his 2009 Yearbook of Astronomy (pp. 133–135).

== Gallery ==
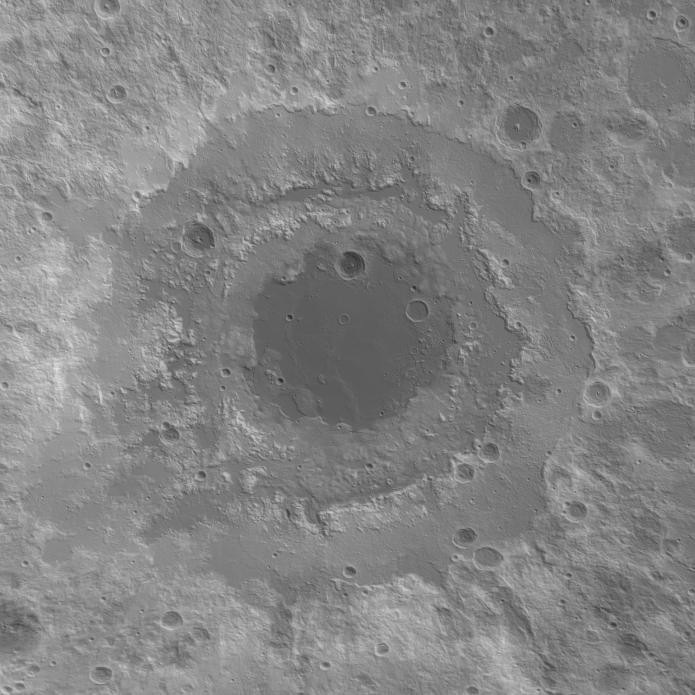
Topographic map

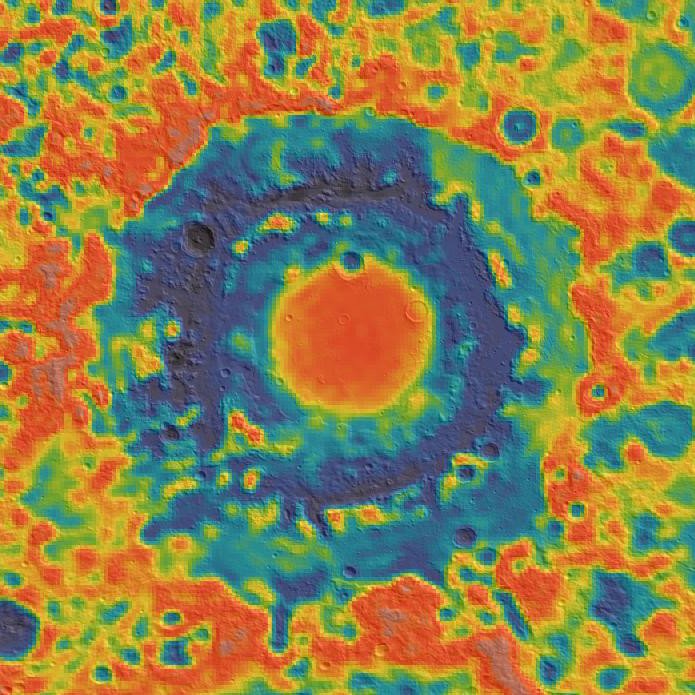
Gravity map based on GRAIL

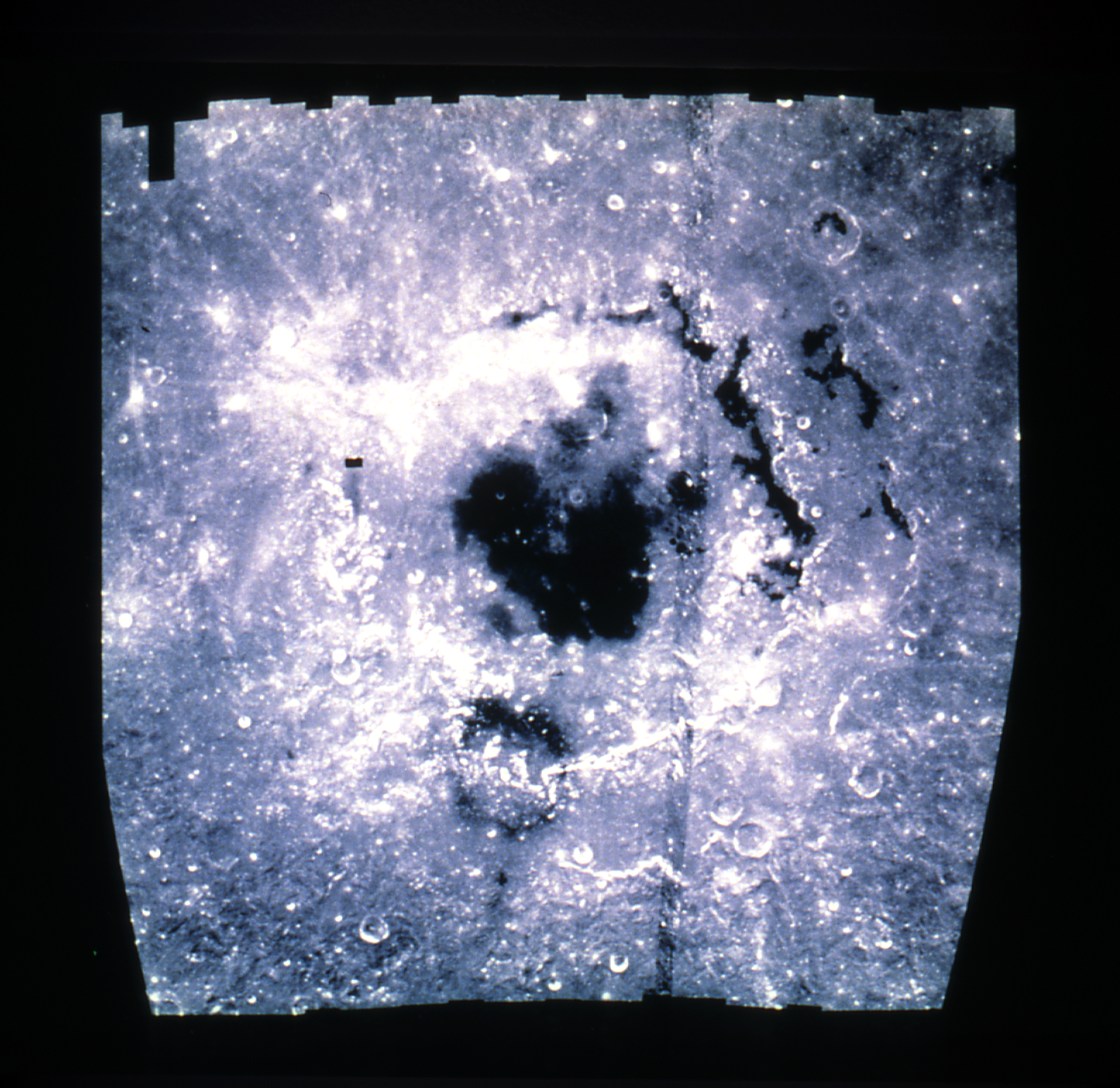
Albedo mosaic of Clementine images

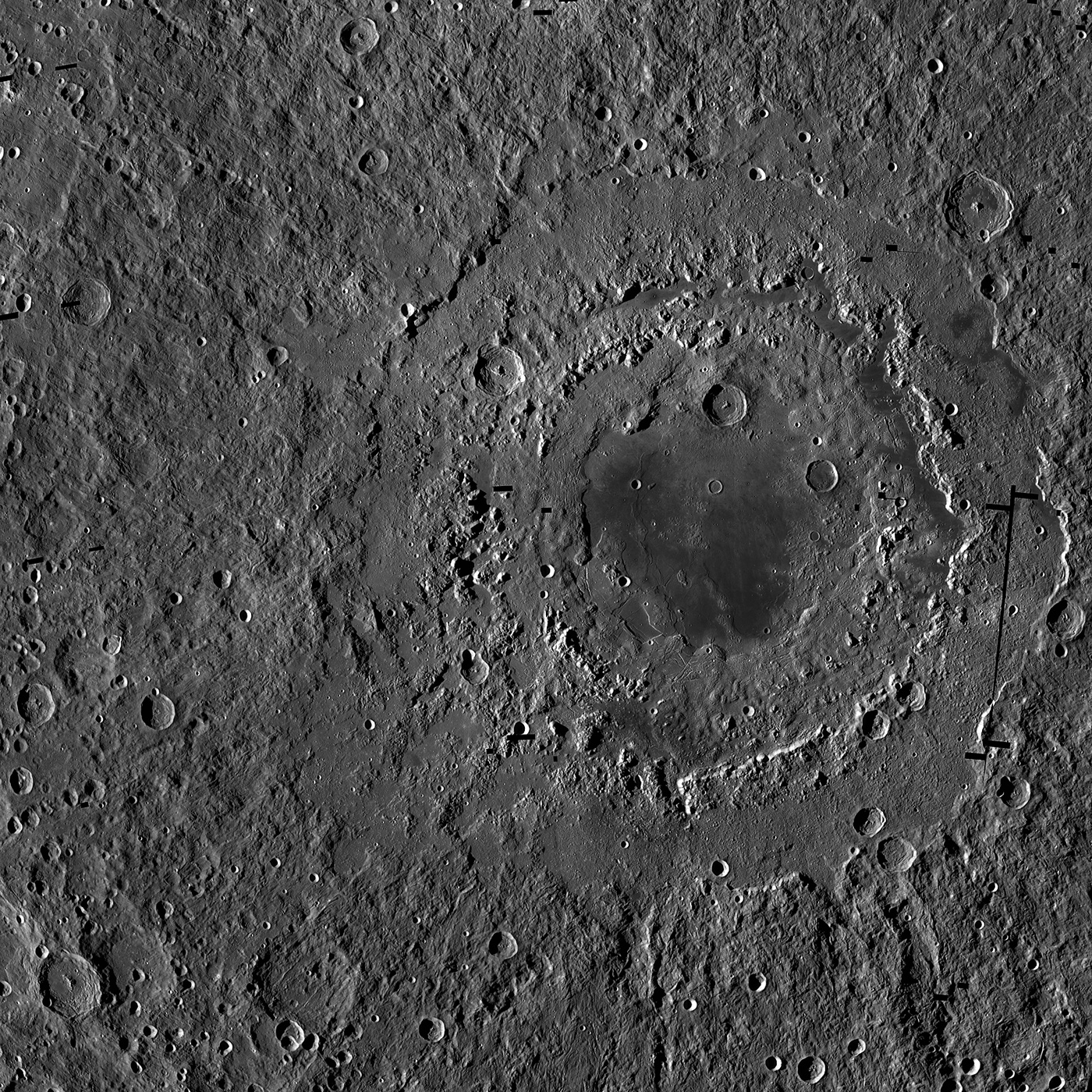
2010 photomosaic by Lunar Reconnaissance Orbiter

Photograph from Earth at full moon with Mare Orientale marked on the limb

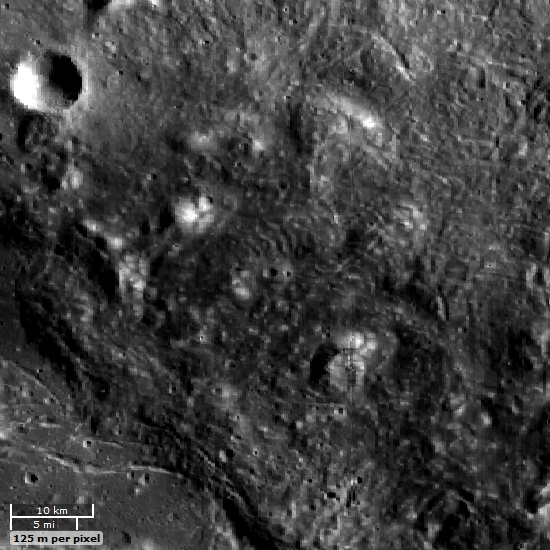
Dome-shaped hills at the southern edge of Mare Orientale Basin, possibly formed by lava flows

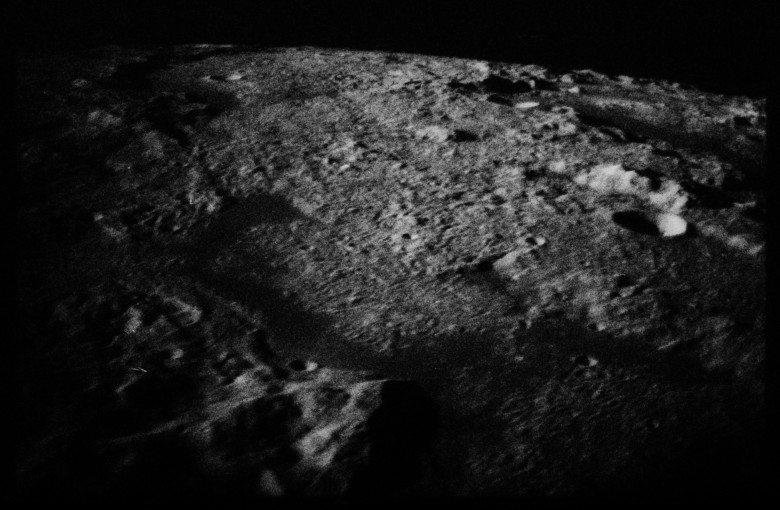
Apollo 17 photographed eastern Mare Orientale in the faint light of earthshine.

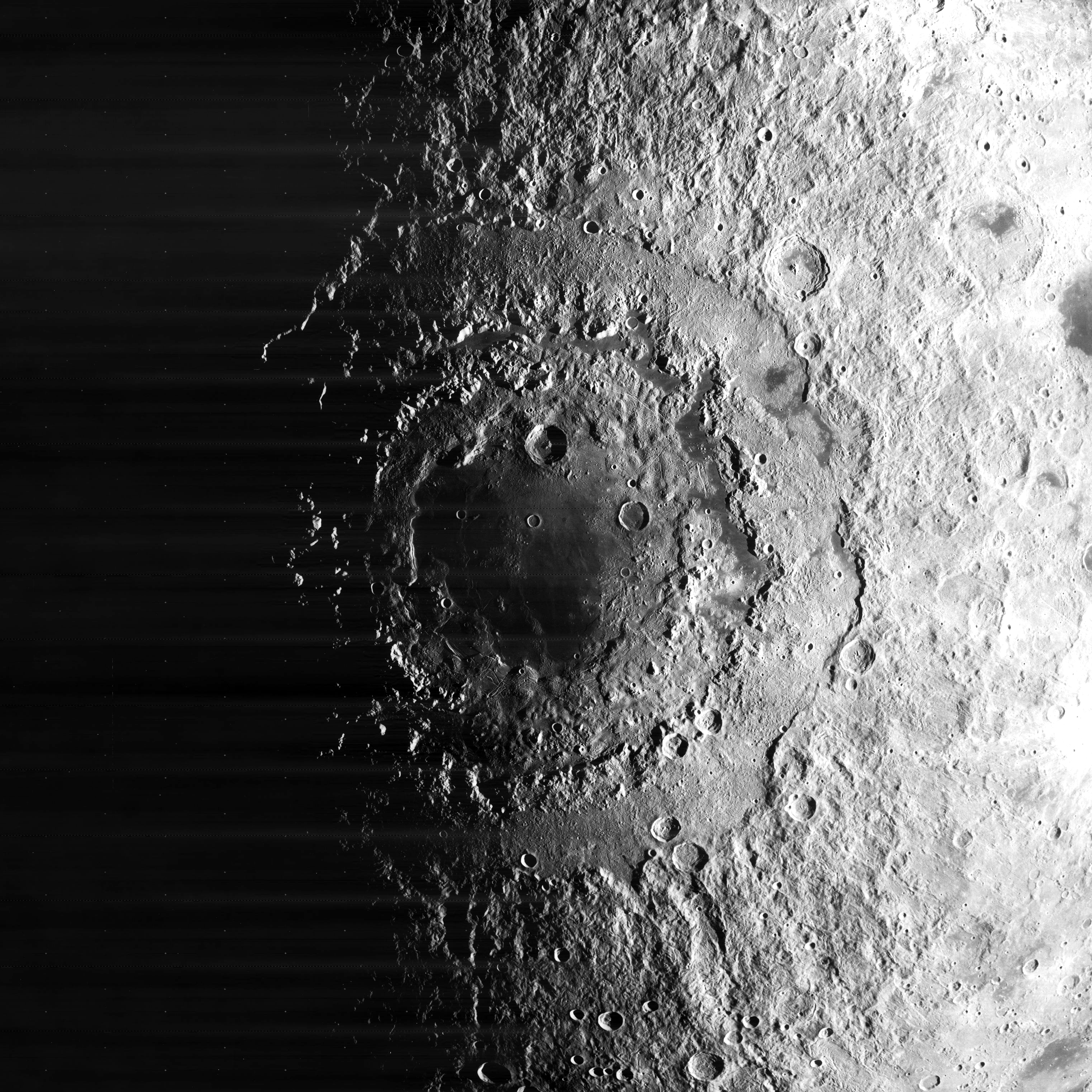
1967 Lunar Orbiter 4 image

== See also ==
- Volcanism on the Moon
- Burney basin – a structurally similar impact basin on Pluto
- Artemis II – 2026 crewed lunar fly-by mission which included observations of Mare Orientale

== Bibliography ==
- Beals, C. S.; Tanner, R. W. (December 1975). "On the Age of Mare Orientale". Journal of the Royal Astronomical Society of Canada. 69: 299–306. Bibcode:1975JRASC..69..299B.
- Baum, R.; Whitaker, E. A. (June 2007). "Mare Orientale: The Eastern Sea in the west – Discovery and nomenclature". Journal of the British Astronomical Association. 117 (3): 129–135. Bibcode:2007JBAA..117..129B.
- Consolmagno, G.; Davis, D. M. (2011). Turn Left at Orion (4th ed.). Cambridge University Press. p. 39. ISBN 9780521153973.
- Hartmann, W. K.; Kuiper, G. P. (1962). "Concentric Structures Surrounding Lunar Basins". Communications of the Lunar and Planetary Laboratory. 1 (1): 51–66. Bibcode:1962CoLPL...1...51H.
- Head, J.; et al. (1991). Orientale and South Pole-Aitken Basins on the Moon: Preliminary Galileo Imaging Results (PDF). 22nd Lunar and Planetary Science Conference. 18–22, 1991. Houston, Texas. pp. 23–26. Bibcode:1991LPICo.758...23H. NASA Accession No. N91-20002.
