= Couder =

Couder may refer to:

- André Couder (1897–1979), French astronomer and optician
- Auguste Couder (1789-1873), French painter
- Juan Manuel Couder (born 1934), Spanish tennis player
- Couder (crater), a lunar crater
