= Lilian Martin-Leake =

British astronomer and scientific illustrator

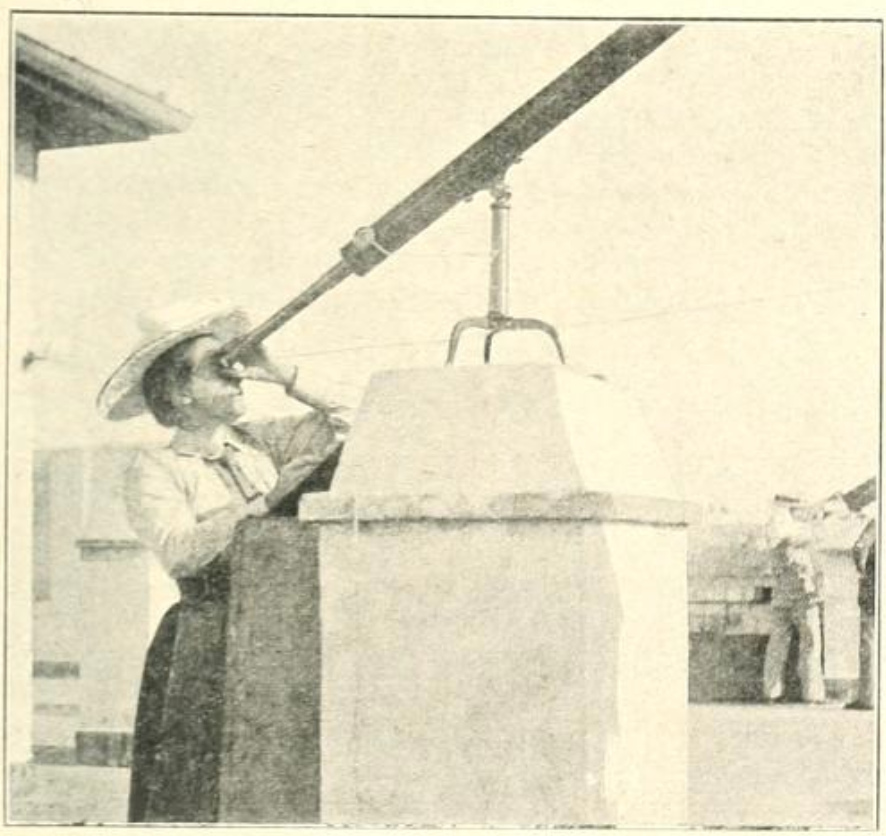
- Born: 17 March 1867; Paddington, London, England
- Died: 1962 (aged 95); Bideford, Devon, England
- Occupation(s): Science teacher, Astronomer and scientific illustrator

Lilian Martin-Leake (17 March 1867, Paddington, England – 1962, Bideford, England) was a British astronomer, science teacher and scientific illustrator, and a member of the British Astronomical Association (BAA). She joined the Association on 31 May 1893 at the proposal of Alice Everett and seconded by A S D Russell.

Lilian joined an expedition organized by the BAA to observe the total eclipse of May 28, 1900. Along with four other members, she was stationed on the roof of the Hotel de la Régence in Algiers to examine the structure of the corona through a 3” (75 mm) aperture telescope. Martin-Leake made a drawing from a telescopic view of prominences and chromosphere during the eclipse. Her drawing of the chromosphere and the corona showed red spicules in the chromosphere that were previously thought to be mountains.

== Life ==
Lilian Martin-Leake was born on 17 March 1867 to the family of William Martin-Leake, a civil engineer and coffee planter, and Louisa Harriet (Tennant) Martin-Leake. She had seven siblings - five sisters and two brothers. She matriculated at Girton College, Cambridge in 1886 and graduated from there in 1890. Annie Russell and Alice Everett, her proposers for the BAA, attended the same college, graduating a year earlier.

From 1896 to 1900 she was the Science Mistress at Winchester High School. From 1914 to 1915, and again from 1919 to 1928, she was an occasional inspector for the Board of Education.
