= Carte du Ciel =

Unfinished celestial cartography project

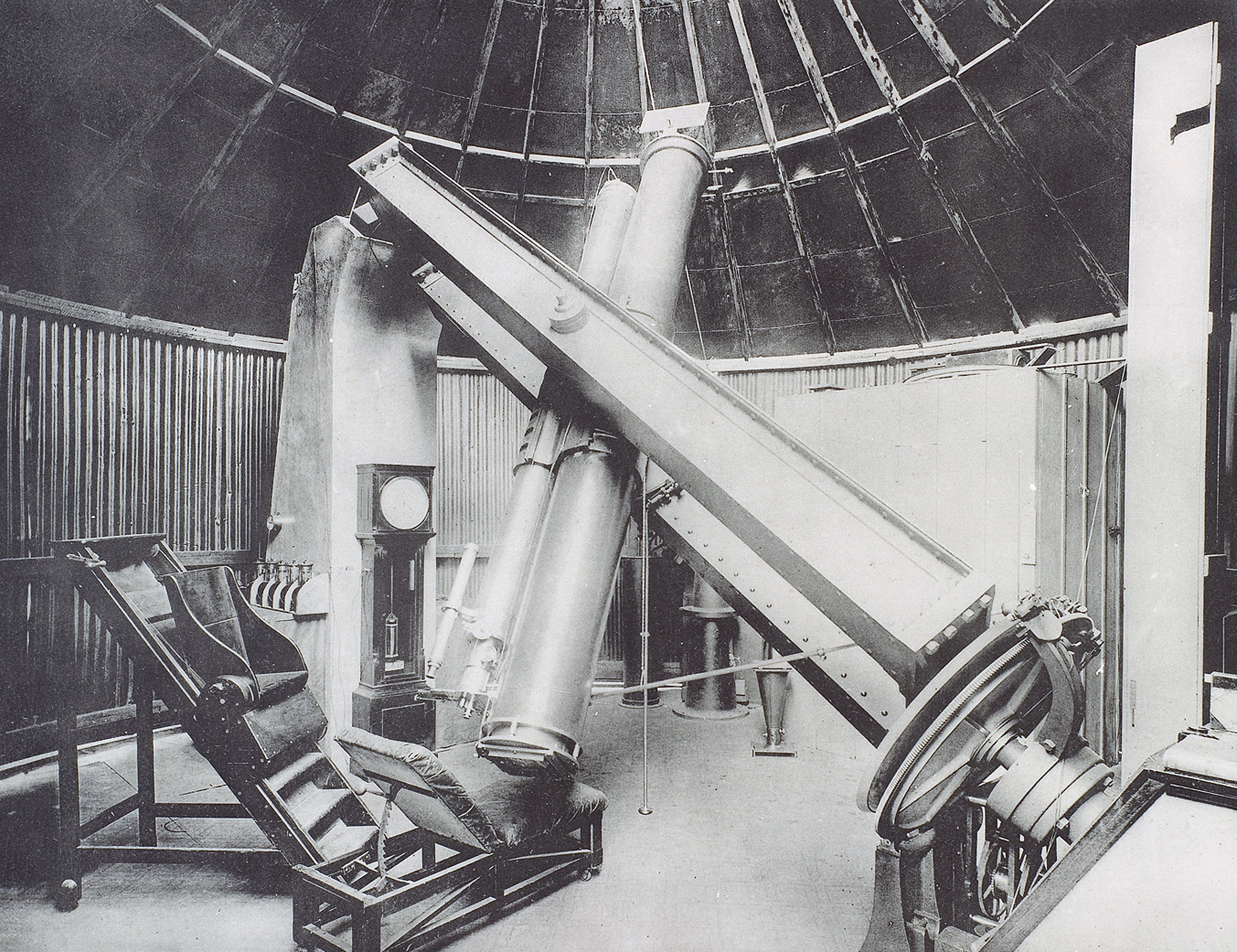
The Sydney 'Star Camera' used in the Carte du Ciel project, original publication, 1892

The Carte du Ciel (French pronunciation: [kaʁt dy sjɛl]; literally, 'Map of the Sky') and the Astrographic Catalogue (or Astrographic Chart) were two distinct but connected components of a massive international astronomical project, initiated in the late 19th century, to catalogue and map the positions of millions of stars as faint as 11th or 12th magnitude. Twenty observatories from around the world participated in exposing and measuring more than 22,000 (glass) photographic plates in an enormous observing programme extending over several decades. Despite, or because of, its vast scale, the project was only ever partially successful – the Carte du Ciel component was never completed, and for almost half a century the Astrographic Catalogue part was largely ignored. However, the appearance of the Hipparcos Catalogue in 1997 has led to an important development in the use of this historical plate material.

== Origins and goals ==
Participating observatories and stars measured in the context of the Astrographic Catalogue
Observatory	Declination		Epoch	No. of
(Zone)	From	To	Epoch	stars
Greenwich	+90°	+65°	1892–1905	179,000
Vatican	+64°	+55°	1895–1922	256,000
Catania, Sicily	+54°	+47°	1894–1932	163,000
Helsinki	+46°	+40°	1892–1910	159,000
Potsdam	+39°	+32°	1893–1900	108,000
Hyderabad north	+39°	+36°	1928–1938	149,000
Uccle, Belgium	+35°	+34°	1939–1950	117,000
Oxford 2	+33°	+32°	1930–1936	117,000
Oxford 1	+31°	+25°	1892–1910	277,000
Paris	+24°	+18°	1891–1927	253,000
Bordeaux	+17°	+11°	1893–1925	224,000
Toulouse	+10°	+05°	1893–1935	270,000
Algiers	+04°	−02°	1891–1911	200,000
San Fernando, Spain	−03°	−09°	1891–1917	225,000
Tacubaya, Mexico	−10°	−16°	1900–1939	312,000
Hyderabad south	−17°	−23°	1914–1929	293,000
Córdoba, Argentina	−24°	−31°	1909–1914	309,000
Perth, Australia	−32°	−37°	1902–1919	229,000
Perth/Edinburgh	−38°	−40°	1903–1914	139,000
Cape Town	−41°	−51°	1897–1912	540,000
Sydney	−52°	−64°	1892–1948	430,000
Melbourne	−65°	−90°	1892–1940	218,000

A vast and unprecedented international star-mapping project was initiated in 1887 by Paris Observatory director Amédée Mouchez, who realized the potential of the new dry plate photographic process to revolutionize the process of making maps of the stars. As a result of the Astrographic Congress of 56 astronomers held in Paris in April 1887, 18 observatories from around the world agreed to participate in the project, and two goals were established:

For the first, the Astrographic Catalogue, the entire sky was to be photographed to 11 mag to provide a reference catalogue of star positions that would fill the magnitude gap between those previously observed by transit and meridian circle instrument observations down to 8 mag – this would provide the positions of a reasonably dense network of star positions which could in turn be used as a reference system for the fainter survey component (the Carte du Ciel). Different observatories around the world were charged with surveying specific declination zones (see table). The Astrographic Catalogue plates, of 6 minute, 3 minute, and 20−25 second exposure, were in due course photographed, measured, and published in their entirety. They yielded a catalogue of positions and magnitudes down to about 11.5 mag, and the programme was largely completed during the first quarter of the 20th century.

For the second goal, a second set of plates, with longer exposures but minimal overlap, was to photograph all stars to 14 mag. These plates were to be reproduced and distributed as a set of charts, the Carte du Ciel, in contrast to previous sky charts which had been constructed from the celestial coordinates of stars observed by transit instruments. Most of the Carte du Ciel plates used three exposures of 30−40 minute duration, displaced to form an equilateral triangle with sides of 10 arcsec, making it easy to distinguish stars from plate flaws, and asteroids from stars.

A contemporary account of this vast international astronomical collaboration, published in 1912, was given by Herbert Hall Turner, then Savilian Professor of Astronomy at Oxford University. Other aspects are covered in various papers in the Proceedings of IAU Symposium Number 133 held in 1988.

== The Astrographic Catalogue ==
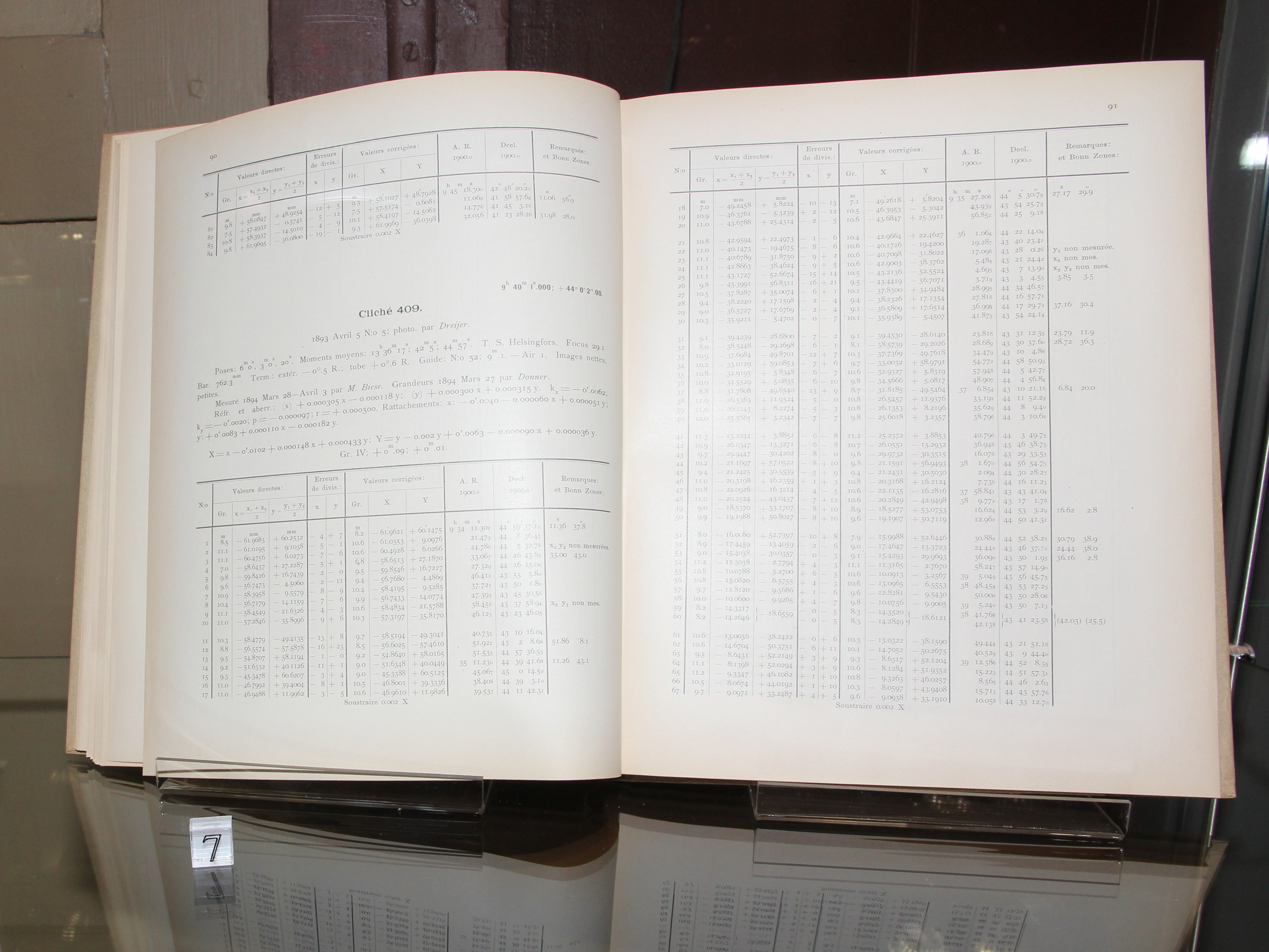
Catalogue photographique du Ciel I–VIII published by Helsinki University Observatory in 1937.

For the Astrographic Catalogue, 17−20 observatories from around the world participated in exposing and measuring more than 22,000 glass plates (see table). Around half of the observatories ordered telescopes from the Henry brothers (Paul and Prosper) in France, with others coming from the factory of Howard Grubb of Dublin. These telescopes were termed normal astrographs with an aperture of around 13 inches (33 cm) and a focal length of 11 feet (3.4 m) designed to create images with a uniform scale on the photographic plate of approximately 60 arcsecs/mm while covering a 2° × 2° field of view. Each observatory was assigned a specific declination zone to photograph. The first such plate was taken in August 1891 at the Vatican Observatory (where the exposures took more than 27 years to complete), and the last in December 1950 at the Royal Observatory of Belgium (Brussels), with most observations being made between 1895 and 1920. To compensate for plate defects, each area of the sky was photographed twice, using a two-fold, corner-to-centre overlap pattern, extended at the zone boundaries, such that each observatory's plates would overlap with those of the adjacent zones. The participating observatories agreed to use a standardized telescope so that all plates had a similar scale of approximately 60 arcsec/mm. The measurable areas of the plates were 2.1°×2.1° (13 cm×13 cm), so the overlap pattern consisted of plates that were centred on every degree band in declination, but offset in right ascension by two degrees. Many factors, such as reference catalogue, reduction technique and print formats were left up to the individual institutions. The positional accuracy goal was 0.5 arcsec per image.

Plate measurement was a protracted affair, with measuring done by hand. The plates were turned over to a large number of people working as computers to determine the positions of the stars on each plate. (Before its modern meaning, the word "computer" meant a person who performs calculations). Women were often employed as computers for financial reasons, including Dorothea Klumpke in Paris, and Annie Russell and Alice Everett in Greenwich. These human computers would manually measure each star with respect to the dozen or so reference stars within that particular plate, and then perform calculations to determine the star's right ascension and declination. The original goal of 11 mag for the limiting magnitude was generally surpassed, however, with some observatories routinely measuring stars as faint as 13 mag. In total, some 4.6 million stars (8.6 million images) were observed. The brightest stars were over-exposed on the plates, not measured, and therefore missing in the resulting catalogues. The plate measurements (as rectangular coordinates), as well as the formulae to transform them to equatorial coordinates, were published in the original volumes of the Astrographic Catalogue, although the accompanying equatorial coordinates are now of only historical interest. Publication of the measurements proceeded from 1902 to 1964, and resulted in 254 printed volumes of raw data.

For decades, the Astrographic Catalogue was largely ignored. The data were difficult to work with because they were available neither in machine-readable form nor in equatorial coordinates. Decades of labour were expended internationally before the project was superseded by modern astronomical techniques. One problem was that the work took much longer than expected. As originally envisaged, the project was meant to have taken only 10 to 15 years. A more serious problem was that while many European astronomers were preoccupied with this project, which required steady, methodical labor rather than creativity, in other parts of the world notably the United States astrophysics was becoming far more important than astrometry. As a result, French astronomy in particular fell behind and lagged for decades.

== The Carte du Ciel ==
The still-more-ambitious Carte du Ciel component of the programme was undertaken by some of the participating observatories, but neither completed nor even started by others. The charts proved to be excessively expensive to photograph and reproduce, generally via engraved copper plates (photogravure), and many zones were either not completed or properly published. The plates which were taken generally still exist, but cover only half of the sky. They are typically archived at their original observatories. A very few plates have recently been re-measured and re-analysed with the availability of the Hipparcos Catalogue data (see below).

== Combination of the Astrographic Catalogue with Hipparcos ==
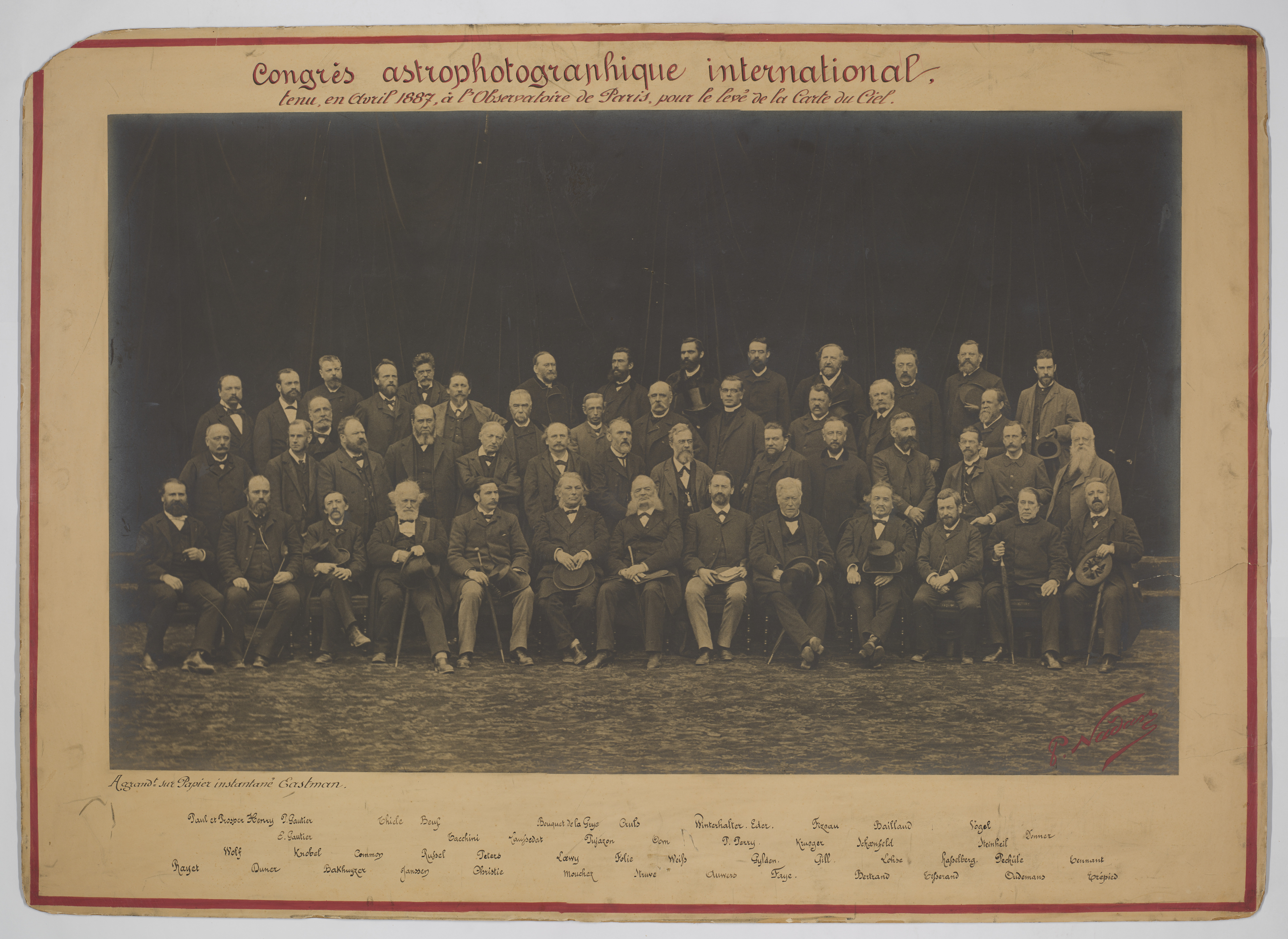
1887 International Astrographic Congress

The vast amount of work invested in the Astrographic Catalogue, taking plates, measuring, and publishing, was looked at for a long time as giving only a marginal scientific profit. The possibility of combining these century-old star positions with the results from ESA's Hipparcos space astrometry satellite allows high accuracy proper motions to be derived for 2.5 million stars.

Specifically, the Astrographic Catalogue positions were transferred from the decades-old printed catalogues into machine readable form (undertaken at the Sternberg Astronomical Institute in Moscow under the leadership of A. Kuzmin) between 1987 and 1994. The data was then reduced anew (at the US Naval Observatory in Washington under the leadership of Sean Urban), using the reference stars measured by the Hipparcos astrometry satellite.

The stars from the Hipparcos Catalogue were used to establish a detailed reference framework at the various epochs of the Astrographic Catalogue plates, while the 2.5 million stars in the Tycho-2 Catalogue provided a dense reference framework to allow the plate distortions to be accurately calibrated and corrected. The proper motions of all the Tycho Catalogue stars could then be derived especially thanks to the Astrographic Catalogue, but additionally using star positions from more than 140 other ground-based catalogues.

Aside from the 120,000 stars of the Hipparcos Catalogue itself, the resulting Tycho-2 Catalogue (compiled at the Copenhagen University Observatory under the leadership of Erik Høg) became the largest, most accurate and most complete, star catalogue of the brightest stars on the sky. It was the basis for deriving positions for all fainter stars on the sky, until the Gaia 2 Catalog became available in 2017. Sean Urban of the US Naval Observatory wrote in 1998:

The history of the Astrographic Catalogue endeavour is one of dedicated individuals devoting tedious decades of their careers to a single goal. Some believe it is also the story of how the best European observatories of the 19th century lost their leadership in astronomical research by committing so many resources to this one undertaking. Long portrayed as an object lesson in overambition, the Astrographic Catalogue has more recently turned into a lesson in the way that old data can find new uses.

== See also ==
- Henry Chamberlain Russell
