= Hohmann (crater) =

Crater on the Moon

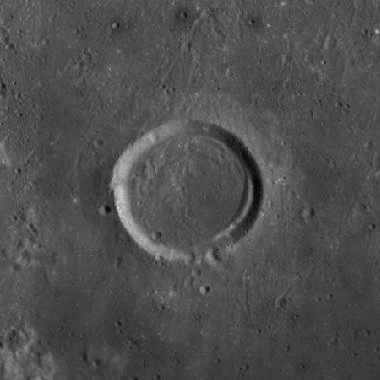
- LRO WAC image
- Coordinates: 17.9°S 94.1°W
- Diameter: 16 km
- Depth: Unknown
- Colongitude: 266° at sunrise
- Eponym: Walter Hohmann

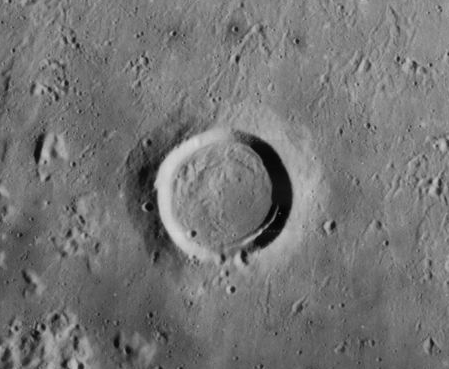
Lunar Orbiter 4 image

Hohmann is a lunar impact crater that lies within the central basin of the Mare Orientale formation, on the farside of the Moon. It is located to the south of the crater Maunder, and to the west of Kopff crater. Due to its proximity to the western lunar limb, this area of the surface is occasionally visible during favorable librations. However the basin is viewed from the side, restricting the amount of detail that can be observed from Earth.

The rim of this crater is circular and only marginally worn, with a pair of tiny impacts overlaying the southern edge. An outer rampart slopes down to the surrounding surface, and the interior wall slopes down more sharply to the crater floor. There is a terrace along the southeastern interior wall. Portions of the surroundings show evidence of ejecta deposits from Maunder to the north (as shown by a number of secondary impacts). Some of this ejecta may have been deposited within the interior of Hohmann.

== Satellite craters ==
By convention these features are identified on lunar maps by placing the letter on the side of the crater midpoint that is closest to Hohmann.

Hohmann	Latitude	Longitude	Diameter
Q	21.8° S	98.1° W	15 km

The following crater has been renamed by the IAU.

- Hohmann T — See Il'in.
