= Edward Walter Maunder =

British astronomer studying sunspots (1851–1928)

Edward Walter Maunder FRAS
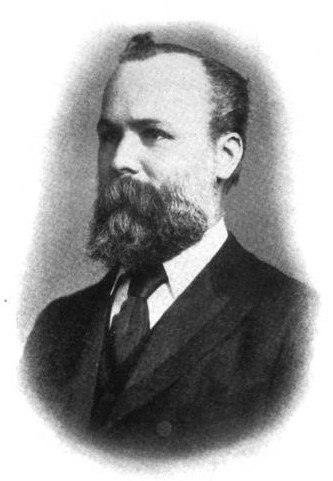
- Born: 12 April 1851; London, England
- Died: 21 March 1928 (aged 76)
- Known for: Maunder Minimum
- Spouse(s): Edith Hannah Bustin (m. 1875–1888) Annie Scott Dill Russell (m. 1895)
- Scientific career
- Fields: Solar astronomy
- Institutions: Royal Observatory, Greenwich

Edward Walter Maunder (12 April 1851 – 21 March 1928) was a British astronomer. His study of sunspots and the solar magnetic cycle led to his identification of the period from 1645 to 1715 that is now known as the Maunder Minimum.

== Early and personal life ==
Maunder was born in 1851, in London, the youngest child of a minister of the Wesleyan Society. He attended King's College London but never graduated. He took a job in a London bank to finance his studies.

In 1873 Maunder returned to the Royal Observatory, taking a position as a spectroscopic assistant. Shortly after, in 1875, he married Edith Hannah Bustin, who gave birth to six children: four sons (one of whom died in infancy) and two daughters. Following the death of Edith in 1888, in 1890 he met Annie Scott Dill Russell (later Annie Russell Maunder), a mathematician and astronomer educated at Girton College in Cambridge, with whom he collaborated for the remainder of his life. She worked as a "lady computer" at the Observatory from 1890 to 1895.

In 1895 Maunder and Russell married. In 1916 Annie Maunder became one of the first women accepted by the Royal Astronomical Society.

== Solar observations ==
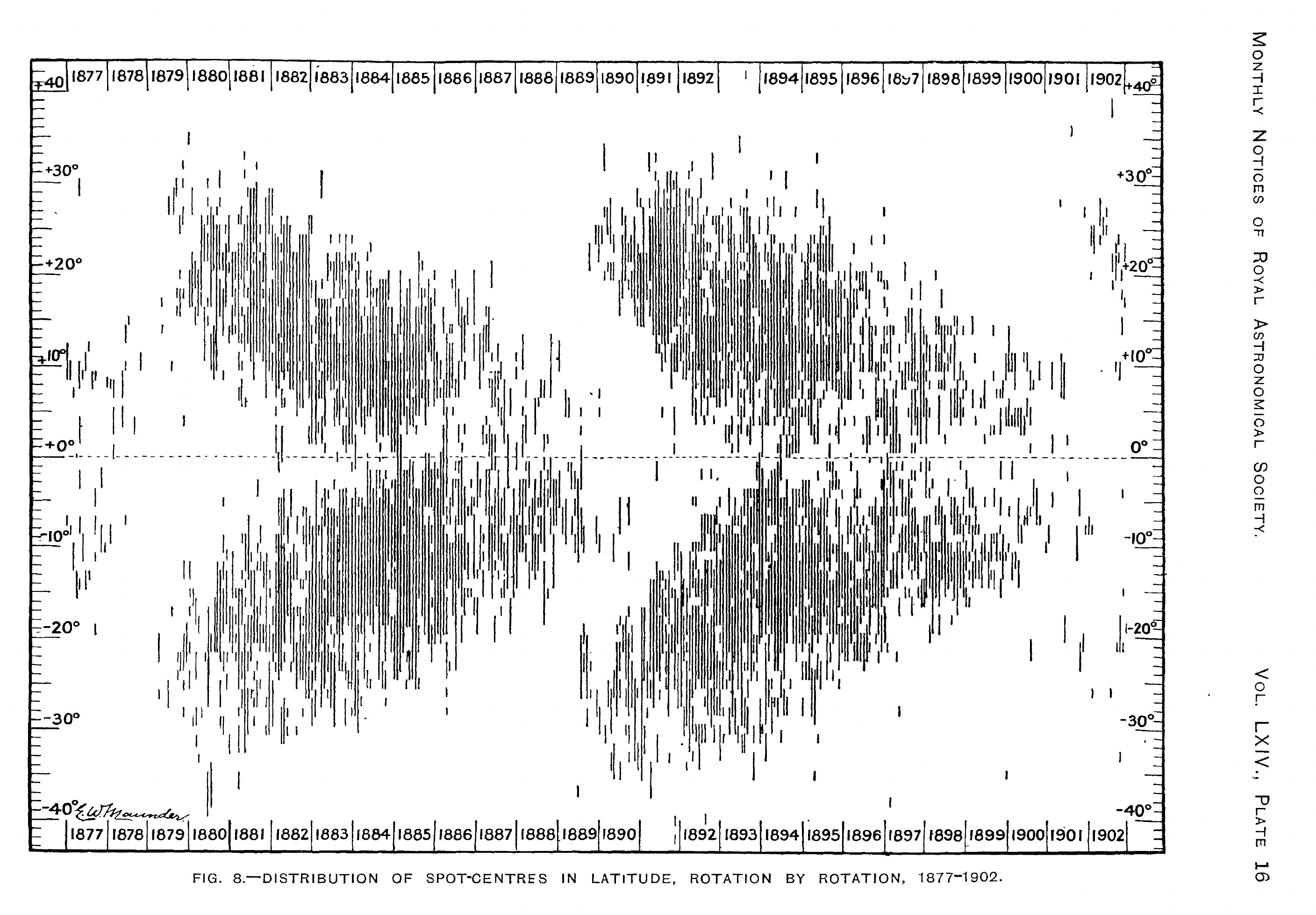
Maunder, E.W.: Distribution of the latitude of sunspot centres (butterfly diagram, 1877-1902), 1904. Figure 8 from Maunder's article Note on the distribution of sun-spots in heliographic latitude. Monthly Notices of the Royal Astronomical Society (MNRAS) 64: 747-761.

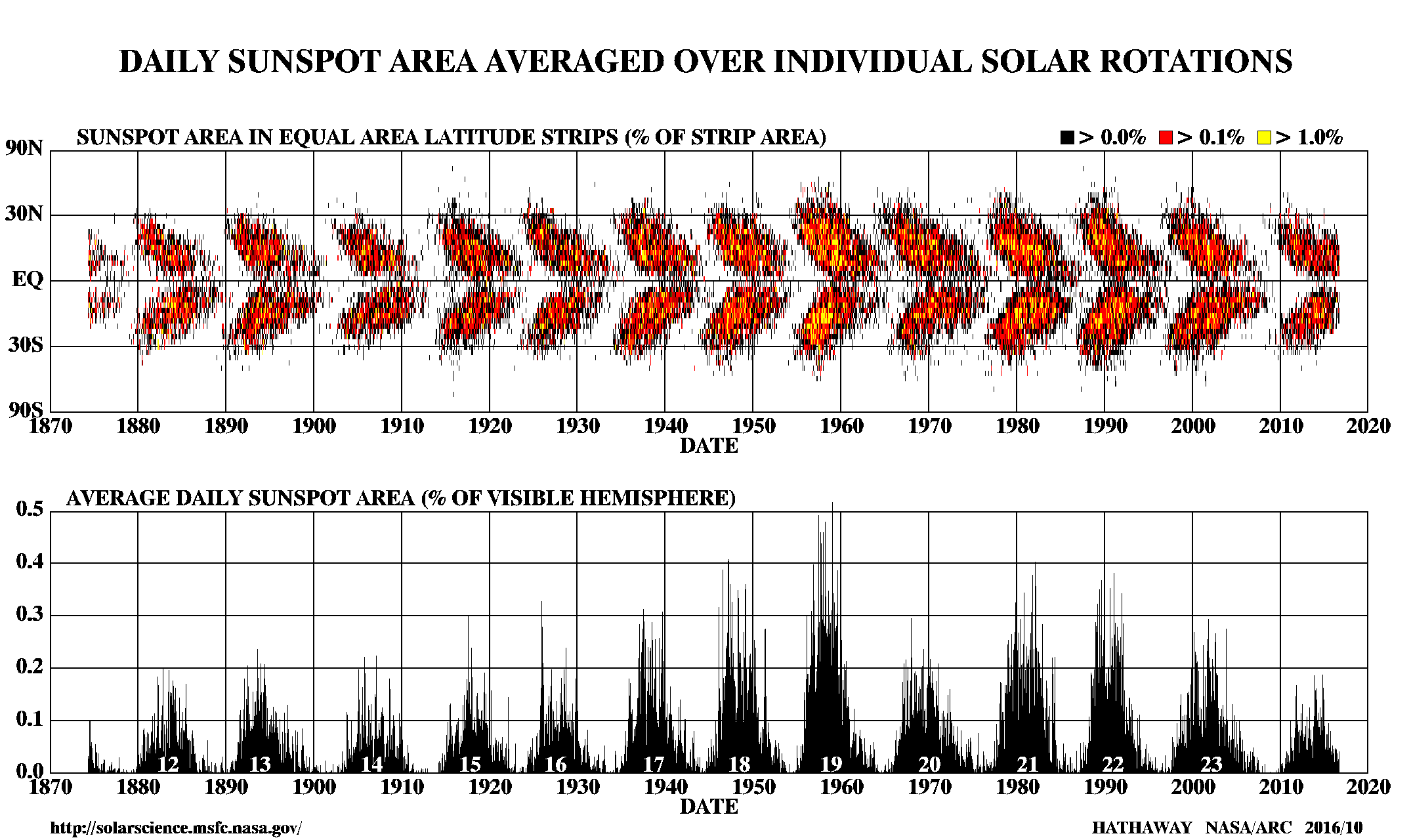
Figure 2: A modern version of the Mauders' sunspot "butterfly diagram". (This version from the solar group at NASA Marshall Space Flight Center.)

Part of Maunder's job at the Observatory involved photographing and measuring sunspots, and in doing so he observed that the solar latitudes at which sunspots occur varies in a regular way over the course of the 11-year cycle. After 1891, he was assisted in his work by his wife Annie Maunder. In 1904, he published their results in the form of the butterfly diagram.

After studying the work of Gustav Spörer, who examined old records from the different observatories archives looking for changes of the heliographic latitude of sunspots, Maunder presented a paper on Spörer's conclusions to the Royal Astronomical Society in 1890 and analyzed the results to show the presence of a prolonged sunspot minimum in the 17-18th century in a paper published in 1894. The period, recognised initially by Spörer, now bears the name Maunder minimum.

He travelled extensively for observations going to places such as the West Indies, Lapland, India, Algiers, Mauritius. His last eclipse expedition was to Labrador for the Solar eclipse of 30 August 1905 at the invitation of the Canadian government.

== Other astronomical observations ==
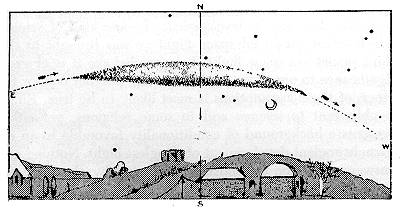
Strange phenomenon on 17 November 1882, observed and described by Maunder in The Observatory, June 1883 (pp. 192–193) and April 1916 (pp. 213–215), which he termed an "auroral beam" and "a strange celestial visitor." Drawing by astronomer and aurora expert John Rand Capron, Guildown Observatory, Surrey, UK, who also observed it. From Philosophical Magazine, May 1883.

In 1882 Maunder (and some other European astronomers) observed what he called an "auroral beam"; as yet unexplained, it had some similarity in appearance to either a noctilucent cloud or an upper tangent arc. However, Maunder wrote that the phenomenon moved rapidly from horizon to horizon, which would rule out a noctilucent cloud or upper tangent arc. Further, upper tangent arc cannot occur during nighttime when the observation was made. Since he made his observation during highly intense auroral activity, he assumed it was some extraordinary auroral phenomenon, though one he had never observed again before or after.

He observed Mars and was a sceptic of the notion of Martian canals. He conducted visual experiments using marked circular disks which led him to conclude, correctly, that the viewing of canals arose as an optical illusion. Also he was convinced that there cannot be life "as in our world" on Mars, as there are no temperature-equating winds and too low mean temperatures. Craters on Mars and the Moon were named in his and his wife Annie's honour.

== Establishment of the British Astronomical Association ==
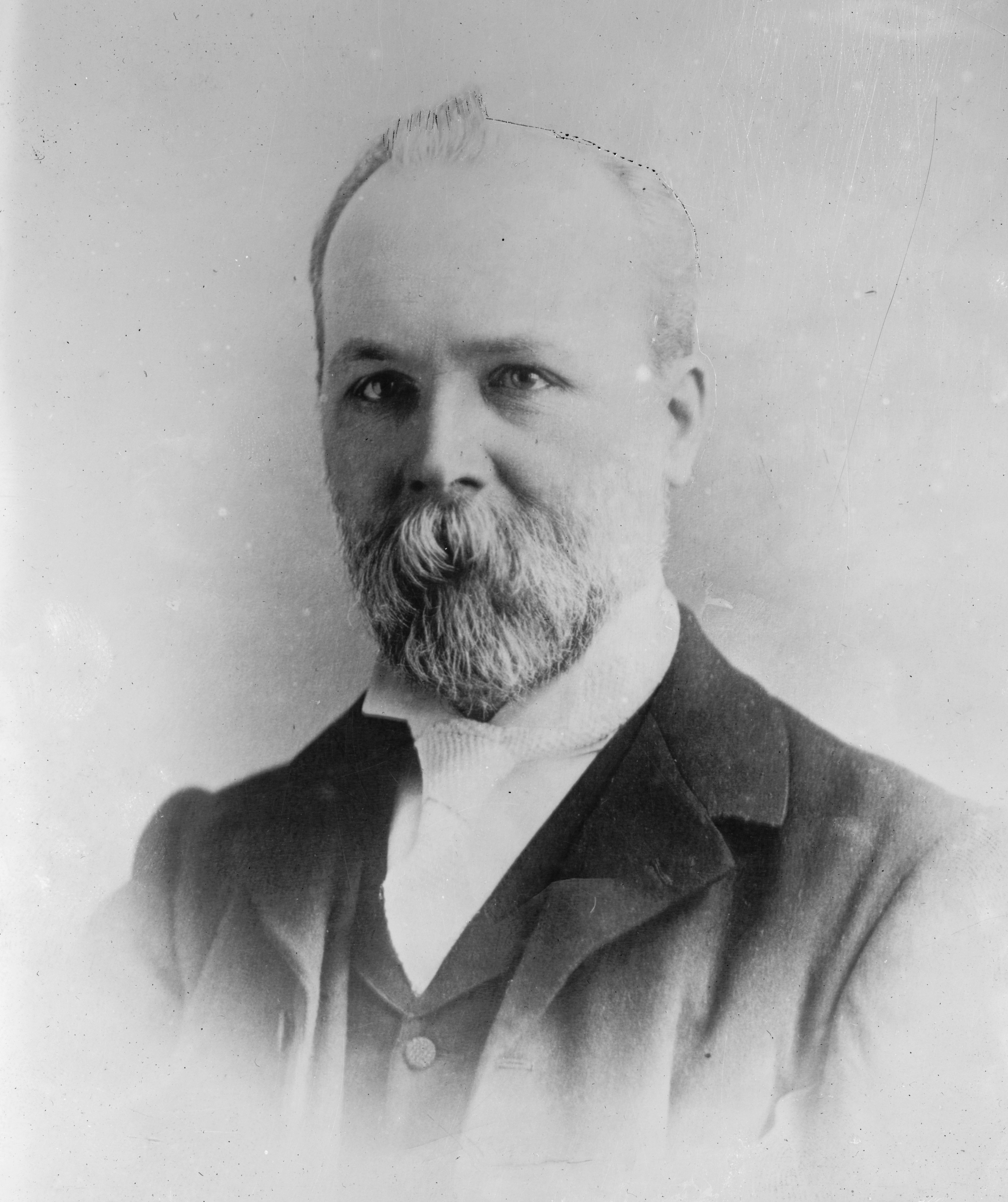
Maunder in 1900

In 1890, Maunder was a driving force in the foundation of the British Astronomical Association. Although he had been fellow of the Royal Astronomical Society since 1875, Maunder wanted an association of astronomers open to every person interested in astronomy, from every class of society, and especially open for women.

Maunder was the first editor of the Journal of the BAA, an office later taken by his wife Annie Maunder. He was also director of its Mars Section 1892–1893, the Star Colour Section 1900–1901, President 1894-1896 and finally Solar Section director 1910–1925. His older brother, Thomas Frid Maunder (1841–1935), was a co-founder and secretary of the BAA for 38 years.

== Publications ==
- Maunder, E. Walter (1899). The Indian Eclipse, 1898: Report of the Expeditions Organized by the British Astronomical Association ... London: Hazel, Watson, and Viney, Ld.
- Maunder, E. Walter (1900). The Royal Observatory, Greenwich—Original publication: London: The Religious Tract Society
- Maunder, E. Walter (1904). Astronomy without a Telescope. London: W. Thacker and Co. "maunder edward."
- Maunder, E. W. (1904). "Note on the Distribution of Sun-Spots in Heliographic Latitude, 1874–1902". Monthly Notices of the Royal Astronomical Society. 64 (8): 747–761. Bibcode:1904MNRAS..64..747M. doi:10.1093/mnras/64.8.747.
- Maunder, E. (1908). Astronomy of the Bible: An Elementary Commentary on the Astronomical References of Holy Scripture. New York: Mitchell Kennerley (reprinted in 2007).
- Maunder, A. and E. (1910). The Heavens and their Story. London: Charles H. Kelly.
- Maunder, E. Walter (1912). The Science of the Stars. London: T.C. and E.C. Jack.
- Maunder, E. Walter (1913). Are the Planets Inhabited?. New York: Harper and Brothers.

== Commemoration ==
In 2022 English Heritage announced that Annie and Walter Maunder would be commemorated with a blue plaque at their former home in Brockley, London, later that year. The Maunders wrote The Heavens and their Story while they were living in Brockley.
