= Ilʹin (crater) =

Crater on the Moon

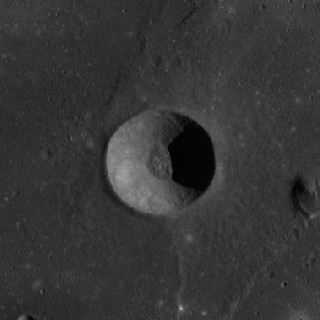
- LRO WAC image
- Coordinates: 17.8°S 97.5°W
- Diameter: 13 km
- Depth: Unknown
- Colongitude: 98° at sunrise
- Eponym: Nikolai Yakovlevich Ilʹin

Ilʹin is a small lunar impact crater that is located on the far side of the Moon, just beyond the western limb. It lies in the western half of Mare Orientale, in the central basin amidst the lava-flooded lunar mare. To the east of this crater is the somewhat larger crater Hohmann.

Ilʹin is circular and bowl-shaped, with little appearance of wear. The interior has a higher albedo than the surrounding lunar mare, but is not noticeably brighter than typical highland terrain.
