= Elizabeth Brown (astronomer) =

British astronomer

Elizabeth Brown FRMetS
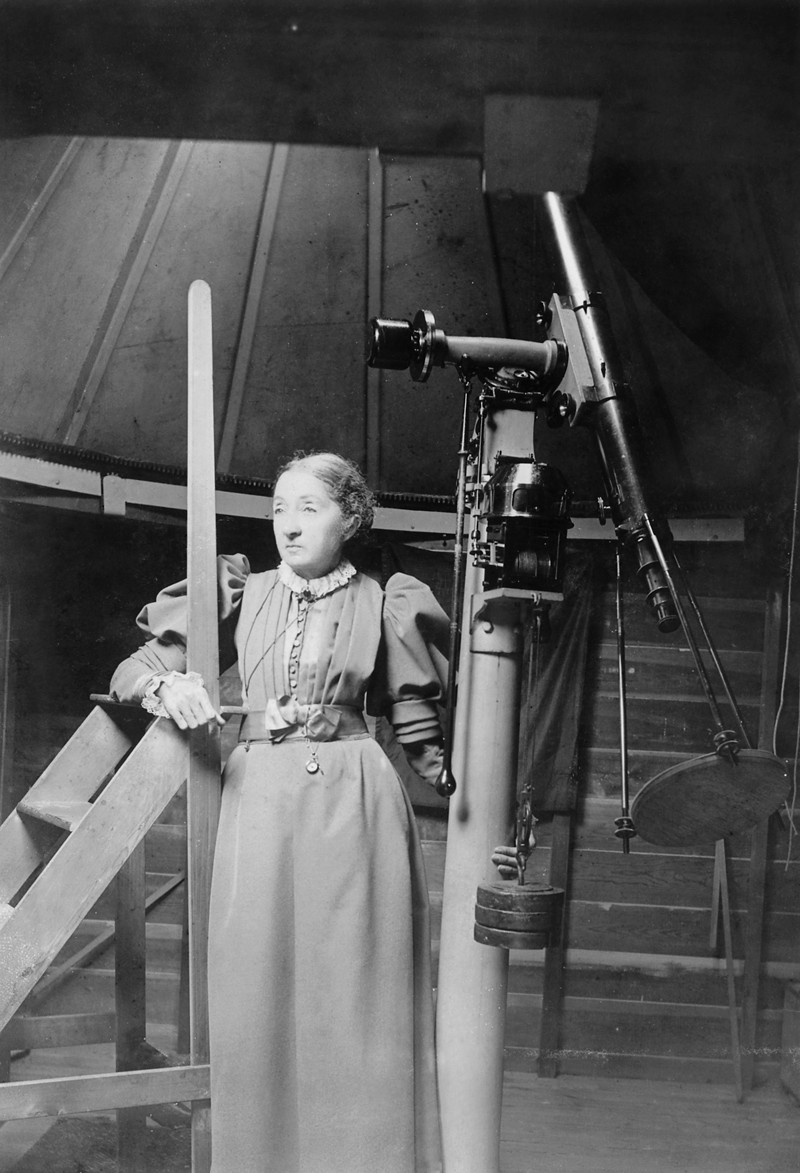
- Brown with her 3½-inch Wray refractor
- Born: 6 August 1830; Cirencester, Gloucestershire, England
- Died: 5 March 1899 (aged 68); Cirencester, Gloucestershire, England
- Occupation: Astronomer

Elizabeth Brown (6 August 1830 – 5 March 1899) was a British astronomer and Quaker who specialized in solar observation, especially sunspots and solar eclipses. She was instrumental in founding the British Astronomical Association and was also one of the first women Fellows of the Royal Meteorological Society.

== Life and career ==
Elizabeth was born and lived in Cirencester, Gloucestershire. Her father, Thomas Brown, introduced her to science, including observing sunspots and taking meteorological measurements, notably, of rainfall. She took over her father's meteorological observations from 1871 until his death aged 91 in 1883. After this release of domestic and filial duties, she began to travel the world to make observations of solar eclipses, publishing two anonymous accounts of her travels.

She was admitted to the Liverpool Astronomical Society following the death of her father. At this time the society operated as an association of amateur astronomers across Britain, rather than as a local organisation. Brown travelled a 140-mile round journey from Cirencester to Liverpool to attend its meetings. She soon afterwards became the director of its Solar Section.

Brown had a central role in organising the formation of the British Astronomical Association in 1890, to coordinate the work of amateur astronomers. She became the Director of the new Association's Solar Section, a post which she held until her death in 1899. She also contributed to the activities of other observing sections, including the lunar, variable star and coloured star sections. Following Elizabeth’s death her sister, Jemima (1832-1907), also became a BAA member. Jemima looked after the astronomical instruments that Elizabeth had bequeathed to the Association.

The British Astronomical Association accepted women as members from its start, unlike the Royal Astronomical Society. Brown was one of three women proposed for fellowship of the Royal Astronomical Society in 1892, but all three controversially failed to attract sufficient votes for election (the other two were Alice Everett and Annie Russell; similarly, the nomination of Isis Pogson had been rejected in 1886). She was elected to Fellowship of the Royal Meteorological Society on 19 April 1893.

Elizabeth Brown travelled widely to seek for solar eclipses, an adventure she describes in her work In Pursuit of a Shadow (1887). The title of the book reveals the influence of the earlier Quaker meteorologist Luke Howard who famously used the phrase to describe his work on clouds. A second set of memoirs, Caught in the Tropics, appeared in 1890. Her daily recording of sunspots, including meticulous drawings, earned her a distinguished reputation.

== Publications ==
- Brown, Elizabeth (March 1881). "The aurora of 1881, January 31". The Observatory. 4 (47): 92. Bibcode:1881Obs.....4...92B.
- Brown, E (July 1881). "Fall of an aerolite". The Observatory. 4 (51): 212. Bibcode:1881Obs.....4..212B.
- Brown, E (October 1881). "A Large Meteor". The Observatory. 4 (54): 296. Bibcode:1881Obs.....4..296B.
- Brown, E (June 1882). "Remarkable Sun-spots of April 1882". The Observatory. 5 (62): 172. Bibcode:1882Obs.....5..172B.
- Brown, E (March 1883). "Meteor" (PDF). Nature. 27 (700): 508. Bibcode:1883Natur..27..508B. doi:10.1038/027508c0.
- Brown, E (April 1883). "The Zodiacal Light (?)" (PDF). Nature. 27 (704): 605. Bibcode:1883Natur..27..605B. doi:10.1038/027605f0. S2CID 4101295.
- Brown, E (October 1884). "Fine Display of Aurorae". The Observatory. 7 (90): 297–298. Bibcode:1884Obs.....7..297B.
- Brown, E (March 1885). "Auroræ" (PDF). Nature. 31 (803): 458. Bibcode:1885Natur..31..458B. doi:10.1038/031458d0.
- Brown, E (June 1890). "Sun-spots of 1889". The Observatory. 13 (163): 212. Bibcode:1890Obs....13..212B.
- Brown, E (June 1891). "A few hints to Beginners in Solar Observation". Publications of the Astronomical Society of the Pacific. 3 (16): 172–175. Bibcode:1891PASP....3..172B. doi:10.1086/120283. S2CID 121142830.
- Brown, E (February 1892). "Note on the Recent Large Groups of Sun-spots". Journal of the British Astronomical Association. 2 (5): 210–211. Bibcode:1892JBAA....2..210B.
- Brown, E (October 1892). "Unusual Appearance in a Sunspot". JBAA. 2 (10): 504. Bibcode:1892JBAA....2..504B.
- Brown, E (January 1893). "Note on the Sunspot of December 24-26, 1892". JBAA. 3 (4): 186–187. Bibcode:1893JBAA....3..186B.
- Brown, E (March 1893). "Some Typical forms of Sunspots". JBAA. 3 (6): 272–273. Bibcode:1893JBAA....3..272B.
- Brown, Elizabeth (September 1893). "The Total Solar Eclipse of 1896". The Observatory. 16: 326–327. Bibcode:1893Obs....16..326B.
- Brown, E (October 1893). "Large Sun-spots of August 1893". JBAA. 3: 494–496. Bibcode:1893JBAA....3..494B.
- Brown, E (December 1893). "Arrangements for Total Solar Eclipse of August 8, 1896". The Observatory. 16 (205): 414–415. Bibcode:1893Obs....16..414B.
- Brown, E (April 1894). "Note on a Peculiar Feature of the Large Sun-spot of February 1894". JBAA. 4 (7): 300. Bibcode:1894JBAA....4..300B.
- Brown, E (May 1894). "A Visit to the Madrid Observatory". JBAA. 4 (8): 361–362. Bibcode:1894JBAA....4..361B.
- Brown, E (June 1894). "1894 Transit of Mercury". JBAA. 4 (10): 435–6. Bibcode:1894JBAA....4..435.
- Brown, Elizabeth (March 1895). "Variable Orange Stars". The Observatory. 18 (225): 120. Bibcode:1895Obs....18..120B.
- Brown, E (April 1895). "Note on the Zodiacal Light seen at Barbados in January 1890". JBAA. 5: 307. Bibcode:1895JBAA....5R.307B.
- Brown, Elizabeth (May 1895). "Variable Orange Stars". The Observatory. 18 (227): 200–201. Bibcode:1895Obs....18..200B.
- Brown, E (August 1895). "Growth and Decay of Sunspots". JBAA. 5 (9): 460–461. Bibcode:1895JBAA....5..460B.
- Brown, E (November 1895). "The Sunspots of the Past Year". JBAA. 6 (1): 15–20. Bibcode:1895JBAA....6...15B.
- Brown, E (November 1895). "Colours of Stars". JBAA. 6 (1): 32–33. Bibcode:1895JBAA....6...26.
- Brown, Elizabeth (January 1897). "Section for the Observation of Variable Stars. Observations of Variable and Suspected Variable Stars". Memoirs of the British Astronomical Association. 5 (2): 28–29. Bibcode:1897MmBAA...5...28B.
- Brown, Elizabeth (January 1898). "Expedition for the Observation of the Total Solar Eclipse, August 9th, 1896. Miss Brown's Report". Memoirs of the British Astronomical Association. 6 (1): 22–23. Bibcode:1898MmBAA...6...22B.
- Brown, Elizabeth (November 1897). "The Green Ray". Memoirs of the British Astronomical Association. 8 (1): 46.
- Brown, E (February 1898). "Remarkable Group of Sun-spots in December 1897". JBAA. 8 (4): 186–187. Bibcode:1898JBAA....8..186B.
- Brown, E (May 1898). "Summary of Sun-Spots for the half year ending March 31, 1898". JBAA. 8 (6): 276. Bibcode:1898JBAA....8..276B.
- Brown, E (November 1898). "Summary of Sun-spots for the Half Year ending September 30th, 1898". JBAA. 9 (1): 24. Bibcode:1898JBAA....9...24B.

== See also ==
- Timeline of women in science
