= Maunder (lunar crater) =

Crater on the Moon

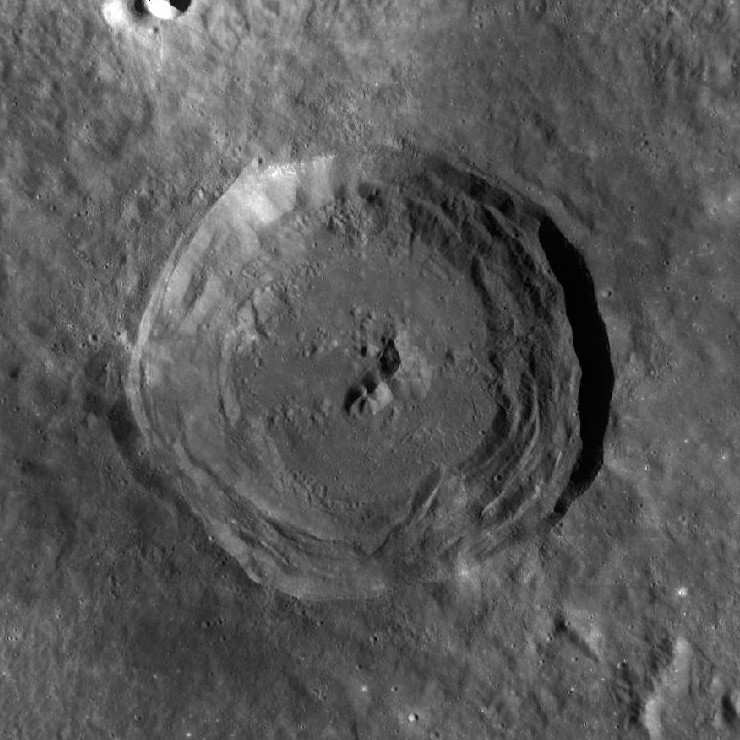
- LRO WAC image
- Coordinates: 14.52°S 93.88°W
- Diameter: 53.80 km
- Depth: 3.2 km
- Colongitude: 94° at sunrise
- Formation: Eratosthenian
- Eponym: Annie S. D. Maunder; Edward W. Maunder

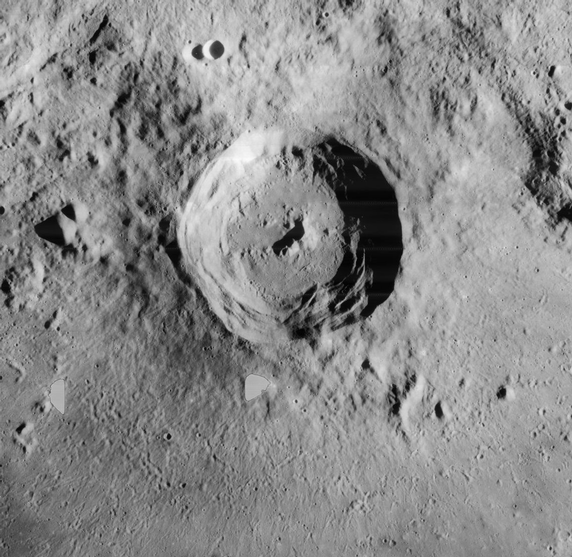
Lunar Orbiter 4 image

Maunder is a lunar impact crater that is located on the far side of the Moon, just beyond the western limb. This region is sometimes brought into view during favorable librations, but not much detail can be seen. The crater lies at the northern end of the Mare Orientale, within the ring of mountains named Montes Rook, and it is the largest crater on this lunar mare. To the southeast is the crater Kopff, and due south is the small Hohmann.

On the lunar geologic timescale, Maunder is a crater of Eratosthenian age. The rim of Maunder is roughly circular, with a sharp edge that has not been significantly eroded. The inner walls are somewhat terraced, and slump down to a rough but level interior floor. The infrared spectrum of pure crystalline plagioclase has been identified on the north and northwest walls, as well as ejecta to the northwest.

At the midpoint of the crater is a double central peak, with the northeastern peak being the larger of the two. The spectra of the central peak fits a noritic gabbro mineralogy, which originated from a depth of 5.5 to 8.4 km. Surrounding the crater is a rough outer rampart that mixes with the rugged terrain along the northern half of the rim. Secondary impacts are visible in the surface to the south.

== Name origin ==
The crater was named after Annie Maunder, an Irish astronomer who worked alongside her husband, Edward Walter Maunder, at the end of the 19th century. Edward Maunder identified the period of colder climate from 1645 to 1715 that is now known as the Maunder Minimum. The name of the crater was approved by the IAU in 1970.

== Satellite craters ==
By convention, these features are identified on lunar maps by placing the letter on the side of the crater midpoint that is closest to Maunder.

Maunder	Latitude	Longitude	Diameter
A	3.2° S	90.5° W	15 km
B	9.0° S	90.3° W	17 km

The following crater has been renamed by the IAU.

- Maunder Z — See Couder (crater).
