= Ernest Mouchez =

French astronomer and admiral

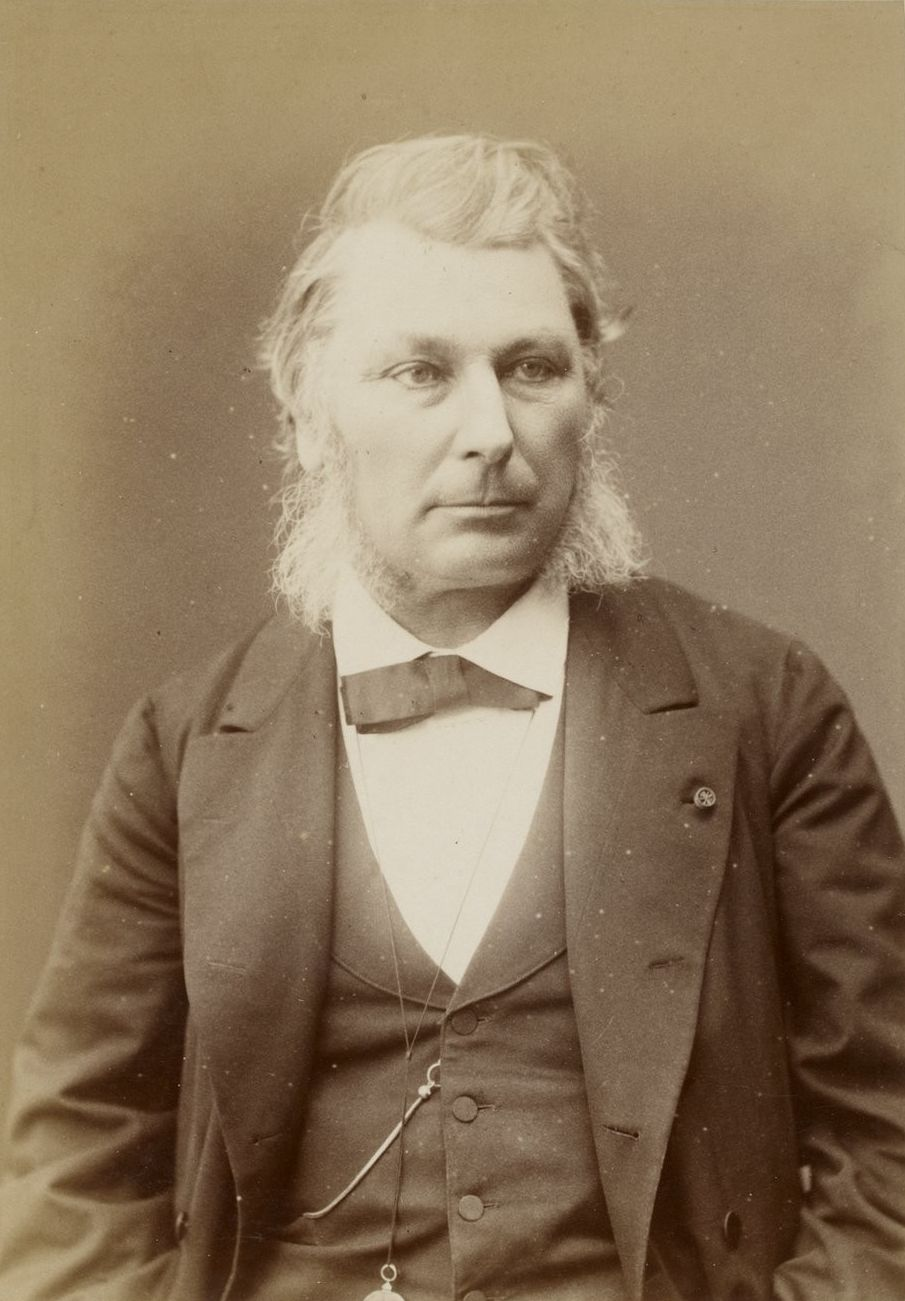
- Born: 24 August 1821; Madrid, Spain
- Died: 25 June 1892 (aged 70); Wissous, Seine-et-Oise
- Citizenship: French
- Known for: Carte du Ciel
- Scientific career
- Fields: Astronomy, Cartography
- Workplaces: French Navy, Paris Observatory

Ernest Amédée Barthélemy Mouchez (French pronunciation: [ɛʁnɛst amede baʁtelemi muʃe]; 24 August 1821 – 25 June 1892) was a French naval officer who became director of the Paris Observatory and launched the ill-fated Carte du Ciel project in 1887.

== Life ==
Born in Madrid, Spain, Mouchez embarked on a career in the French Navy as an ensign in 1843. This was a period of relative international maritime peace and much of the navy's activities were dedicated to exploration and discovery. Mouchez was initially occupied on hydrographic studies along the coasts of Korea, China and South America, penetrating 320 km up the Paraguay River and exploring the Abrolhos Islands. He improved the practice of surveying at sea, adapting terrestrial instruments for naval use, and was especially concerned with the problems of determining longitude. He developed the use of the theodolite and meridian telescope to improve the error in establishing longitude from around 30″ to 3–4″.

Attaining the rank of post captain in 1868, he embarked on a series of expeditions to chart the coast of Algeria. However, in 1870, during the Franco-Prussian War, he was called upon to make an heroic defence of the port of Le Havre.

Returning to his Algerian survey, he brought it to a conclusion in 1873, when he was elected to the Bureau des Longitudes and, in the following year, was sponsored by the Académie des sciences to observe the transit of Venus from St. Paul Island in the Indian Ocean. On 9 December he made a sequence of superb photographic plates of the event.

In 1875, the Académie elected him a member of the astronomy section and in 1878 he was promoted to rear admiral and awarded the role of director of the Paris Observatory. The observatory had fallen into disrepair and disrepute since the chaos of the 1870 war and the Paris Commune of 1871. Mouchez set about a programme of reconstruction but failed to persuade the government to fund a new observatory outside the centre of Paris.

In 1887, he collaborated with Sir David Gill to host an international astronomical conference in Paris. The principal outcome of the conference was a multi-national project to compile and index a photographic atlas of the heavens, the Carte du Ciel. The project consumed massive effort over several decades before it was rendered obsolete by modern astronomical methods.

Mouchez died in Wissous, Seine-et-Oise.

Nautical charts and maps from surveys by Mouchez
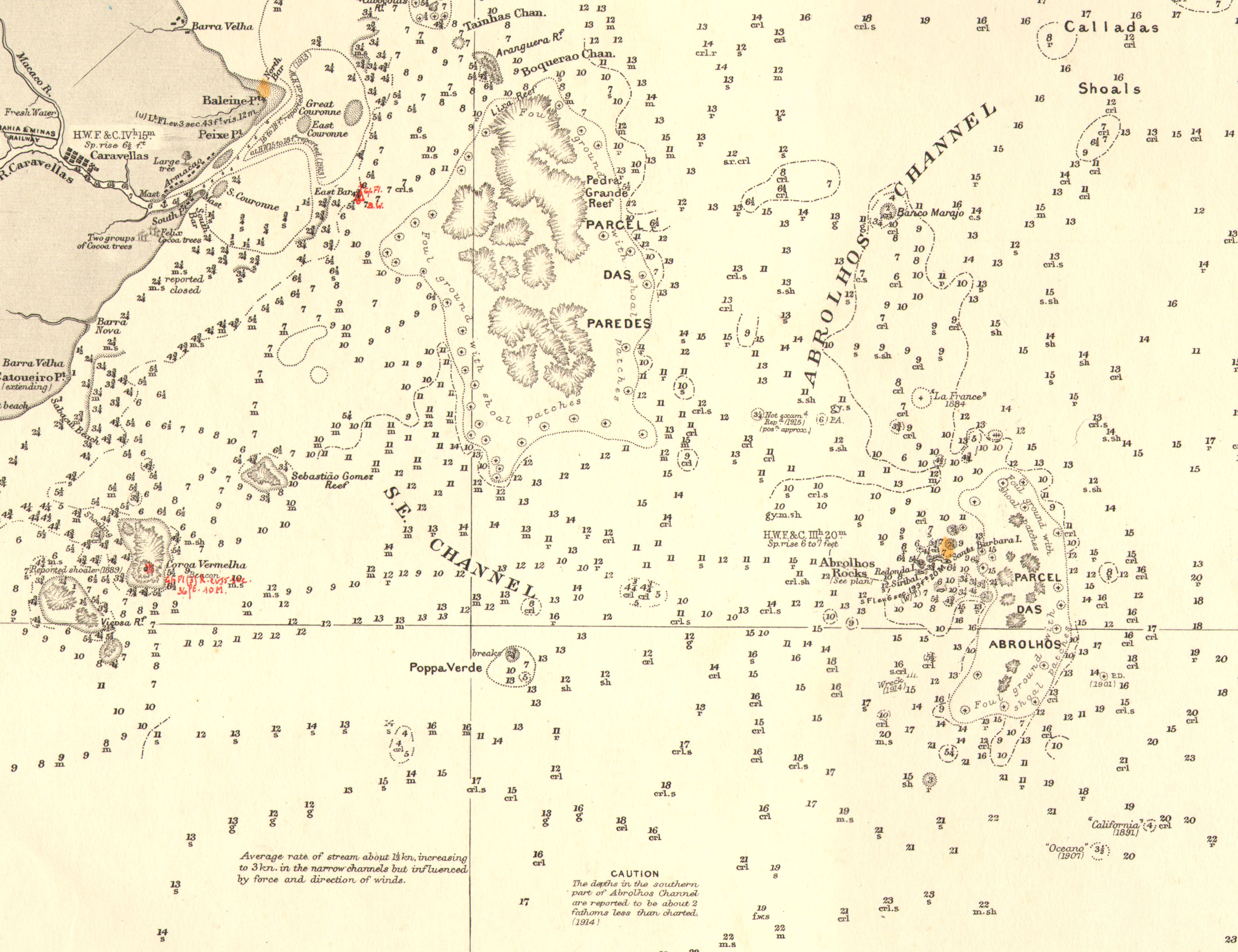
Abrolhos Archipelago, Brazil

Port of Algiers

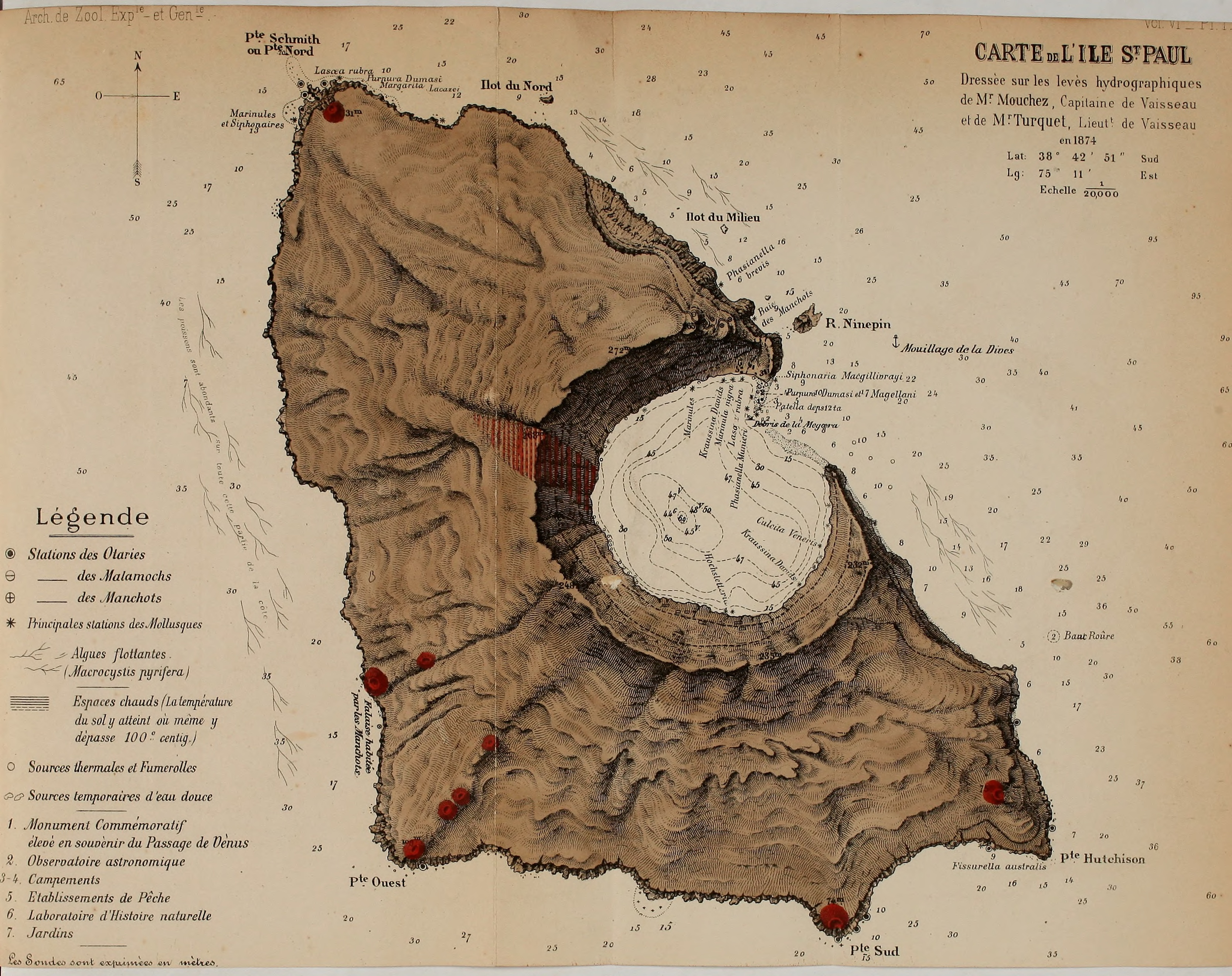
Ile St Paul

== Honours ==
- A statue in Le Havre was unveiled by Benjamin Baillaud in 1921.
- A Street in Paris was given his name.

== Works ==
- Recherches sur la longitude de la côte orientale de l'Amérique du sud (1866)
- Rio de la Plata. Description et instructions nautiques (1873)
- Instructions nautiques sur les côtes d'Algérie (1879)
- Rapport annuel de l'Observatoire de Paris (1885–1892)
- La photographie astronomique à l'Observatoire de Paris et de la Carte de ciel (1887)
- Instructions nautiques sur les côtes du Brésil (1890)
- Works digitalized on Paris Observatory digital library

== Sources ==
- [Anon.] (1875) Notice sur les travaux scientifiques de M. Mouchez, Paris
- [Anon.] (1892) Polybiblion, 2nd ser. 36, July–December
- [Anon.] (1893). "Obituary: List of Fellows and Associates deceased during the year: Amédée Ernest Barthélemy Mouchez". Monthly Notices of the Royal Astronomical Society. 53: 226–229. Bibcode:1893MNRAS..53..226.. doi:10.1093/mnras/53.4.226.
- [Anon.] (2001) "Carte du ciel", Encyclopædia Britannica, Deluxe CDROM edition
- Aubin, D. (2003). "The fading star of the Paris Observatory in the nineteenth century: astronomers' urban culture of circulation and observation". Osiris. 18 (1): 79–100. Bibcode:2003Osir...18...79A. doi:10.1086/649378. S2CID 143773138.
- Simpkins, D. M. (1981) "Mouchez, Ernest Barthélémy", in Gillespie, C. C., ed. (1981). Dictionary of Scientific Biography. New York: Charles Scribner's Sons. ISBN 0-684-16970-3.
- Vapereau, G. (ed.) (1880) Dictionnaire universel des contemporains, 5th ed., Paris

=== Catalogues of Mouchez' works ===
- Royal Society, Catalogue of Scientific Papers, IV 498, VIII 488, X 864;
- Poggendorff, III 940, IV 1034-1035;
- Catalogue général des livres imprimés de la Bibliothèque nationale, CXX, cols.533–538.
