= Walter Hohmann =

German engineer

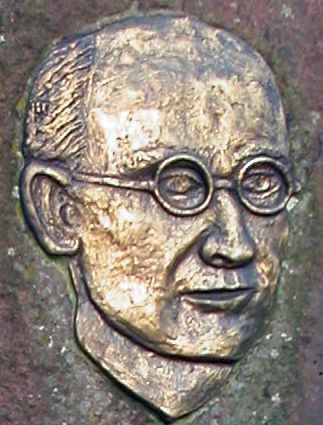
- Born: 18 March 1880; Hardheim, German Empire
- Died: 11 March 1945 (aged 64); Essen, Germany
- Known for: Hohmann transfer orbit
- Scientific career
- Fields: Engineer

Walter Hohmann (/ˈhoʊmən/; German: [ˈhoːman]; 18 March 1880 – 11 March 1945) was a German engineer who made an important contribution to the understanding of orbital dynamics. In a book published in 1925, Hohmann demonstrated a fuel-efficient path to move a spacecraft between two different orbits, now called a Hohmann transfer orbit. He received his Ph.D. from the RWTH Aachen University in 1920.

== Biography ==
Hohmann was born in Hardheim, the son of a doctor. As a boy, he lived with his family in Port Elizabeth, South Africa for a time, before returning to Germany. He studied civil engineering at the Technical University of Munich, graduating in 1904. He then worked for the municipal councils of Vienna, Hanover and Breslau (now Wrocław) before settling in Essen, where he eventually held the post of chief architect.

Hohmann became interested in space as a young boy when his father would show him the southern constellations. As soon as he read the science fiction works of French author Jules Verne and German author Kurd Lasswitz, he started to wonder, "How do you get up there?" Between 1911 and 1912, while Hohmann was working as an engineer in Breslau, his older cousin sent him some astronomy textbooks. Hohmann soon began to fill up most of his free time with the study of astronomy, and started seriously considering the problem of interplanetary spaceflight.

Eventually, Hohmann realized that minimizing the amount of fuel that the spacecraft had to carry would be an important consideration, and he plotted a variety of orbits until he found the one that now bears his name. He published his findings in Die Erreichbarkeit der Himmelskörper (The Attainability of the Celestial Bodies).

The importance of this work saw Hohmann become a leading figure in Germany's amateur rocketry movement in the late 1920s, the Verein für Raumschiffahrt (VfR — "Spaceflight Society"). Writer Willy Ley asked Hohmann to contribute to an anthology of papers on spaceflight, "Die Möglichkeit der Weltraumfahrt" (The Possibility of Space Travel), published in 1928. Hohmann contributed a post about "Fahrtrouten, Fahrzeiten und Landungsmöglichkeiten" (Routes, Timetables, and Landing Options) where he proposed using a separable landing module to travel to the Moon, an idea that was later utilized in the Apollo lunar missions.

Following the rise to power of the Nazi party, Hohmann distanced himself as much as possible from rocketry, wishing to play no part in the development of the rocket as a weapon. He died in an Essen hospital shortly before the end of World War II as a result of stress experienced during the intense Allied bombing of the city.

== Walter-Hohmann-Observatory ==
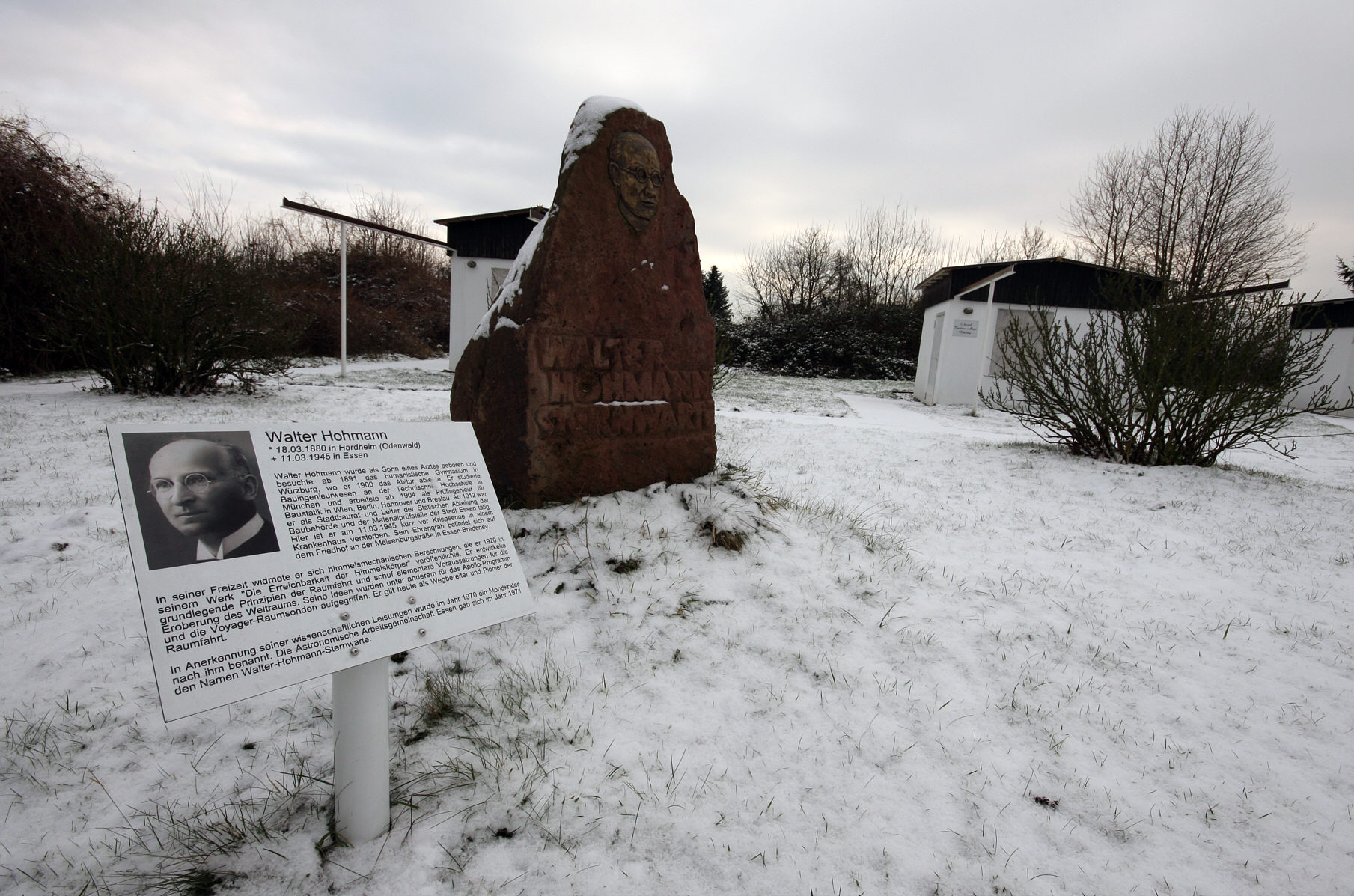
Commemorative plaque at the Walter-Hohmann-Observatory

In 2009, the Walter-Hohmann-Observatory in Essen, Germany installed a Commemorative plaque at their ground:

Walter Hohmann was born as the son of a doctor and visited the high-school in Würzburg (Germany), where he graduated In 1900. He studied engineering at the technical university in Munich (Germany) and worked from 1904 as an engineer for structural analysis in Vienna (Austria), Berlin (Germany), Hanover (Germany) and Wroclaw (Germany). From 1912 he worked as a city planner and director of the static building office and the department of materials testing of the city of Essen (Germany). Here he died in a hospital on 11.03.1945, shortly before the war ended. His honorary grave is located at the cemetery at "Meisenburgstraße" in the city of Essen (Germany).

In his spare time he devoted himself to celestial mechanics calculations, and in 1920 he published his book "Die Erreichbarkeit der Himmelskörper" (The Attainability of the Celestial Bodies). He developed basic principles and created advanced tools necessary for the conquest of space. His ideas were taken up for the Apollo program and the Voyager spacecraft (for example). Today he is considered a pioneer of space travel.

In recognition of his scientific achievements, a lunar crater was named after him in 1970. The Astronomical Association of Essen (Germany) gave itself the name "Walter-Hohmann-Observatory" in 1971.

The lunar crater Hohmann and the asteroid 9661 Hohmann is named after him.
