= Joseph David Everett =

English physicist

Prof Joseph David Everett DCL, FRS, FRSE (1831–1904) was an English physicist, professor of natural philosophy at Queen's College, Belfast.

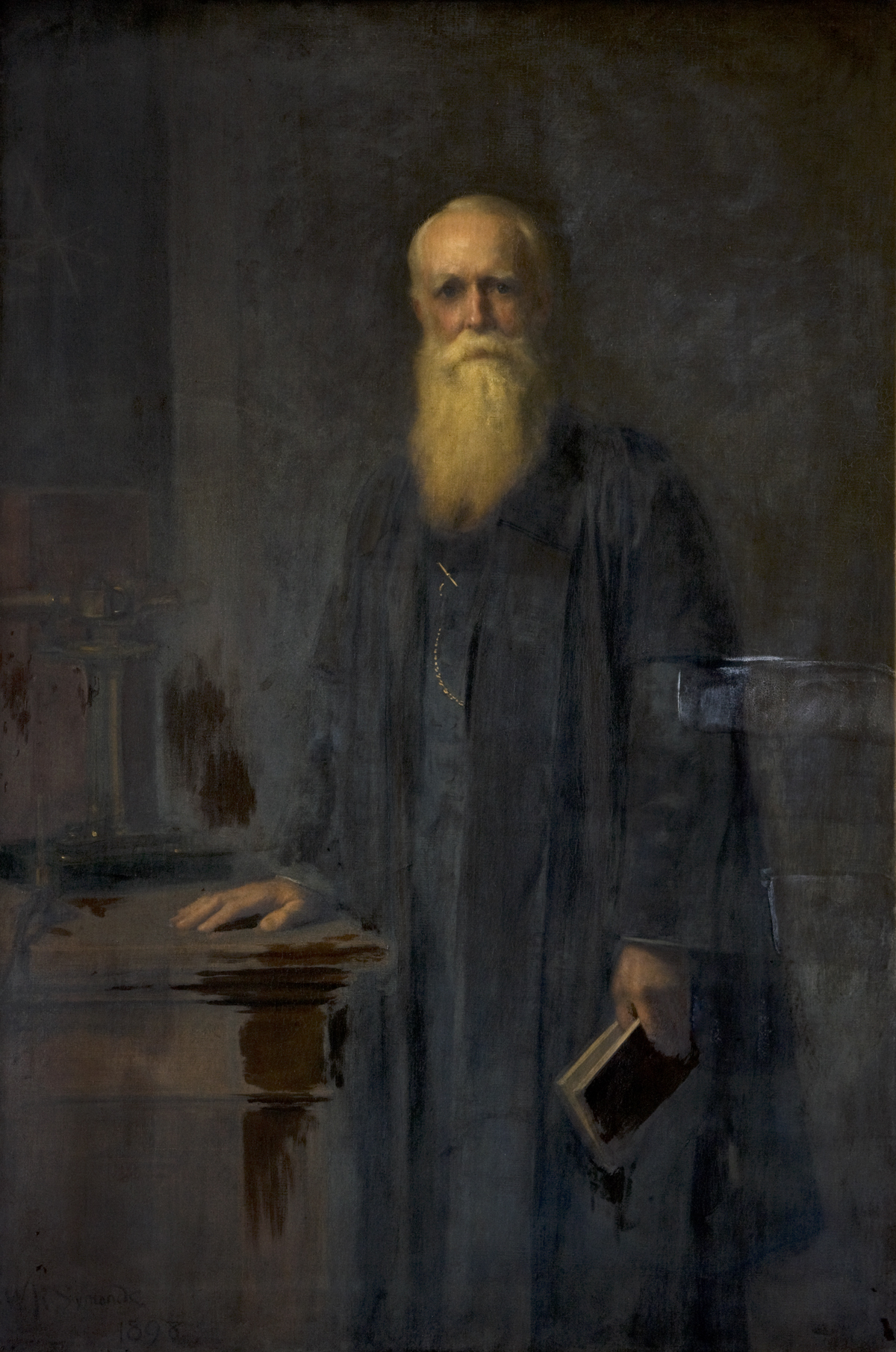
Joseph David Everett, 1898 portrait by William R. Symonds

== Life ==
Born at Rushmere, near Ipswich, Suffolk, on 11 September 1831, he was the eldest son of Joseph David Everett, a landowner and farmer of Rushmere, by his wife Elizabeth, eldest daughter of John Garwood, a corn merchant in London; Robert Lacey Everett was a brother. He was educated at Mr. Buck's private school at Ipswich. On leaving school he attended classes in mathematics at the Ipswich Mechanics' Institution under Stephen Jackson, proprietor of the Ipswich Journal, who advised him to teach.

After a short experience of teaching at a private school at Newmarket, where he had Charles Haddon Spurgeon as a colleague, Everett became, in 1850, mathematical master at John Charles Thorowgood's school at Totteridge. In 1854 he gained one of Dr. Williams's bursaries and became a student at Glasgow College; he graduated B.A. in 1856 with honourable distinction in classics and mental philosophy, and M.A. in 1857 with distinction in physical science. He had thought of entering the ministry, but gave up the idea, and after acting for a short time as secretary of the Meteorological Society of Edinburgh, he became professor of mathematics in King's College, Windsor, Nova Scotia, in 1859. Through his efforts, an astronomical observatory was built at the College in 1861.

Everett returned to Glasgow in 1864 as assistant to Hugh Blackburn, professor of mathematics in the university (1849–79), and worked for a time in Lord Kelvin's laboratory. From 1867 till his retirement in 1897 he was professor of natural philosophy at Queen's College, Belfast, serving on the council from 1875 to 1881.

Everett was elected fellow of the Royal Society of Edinburgh in 1863, and fellow of the Royal Society of London in 1879; and was a vice-president of the Physical Society of London (1900–4). He acted as secretary and subsequently as chairman of the committee of the British Association for investigating the rate of increase of underground temperature downwards (1867–1904), and as secretary of the committee for the selection and nomenclature of dynamical units (1871–3). He was also a fellow of the Royal University of Ireland. He moved from Belfast to London in 1898 and eventually settled at Ealing, regularly attending meetings of scientific societies in London.

He died from heart failure in Ealing on 9 August 1904, and was interred at Ipswich.

== Works ==
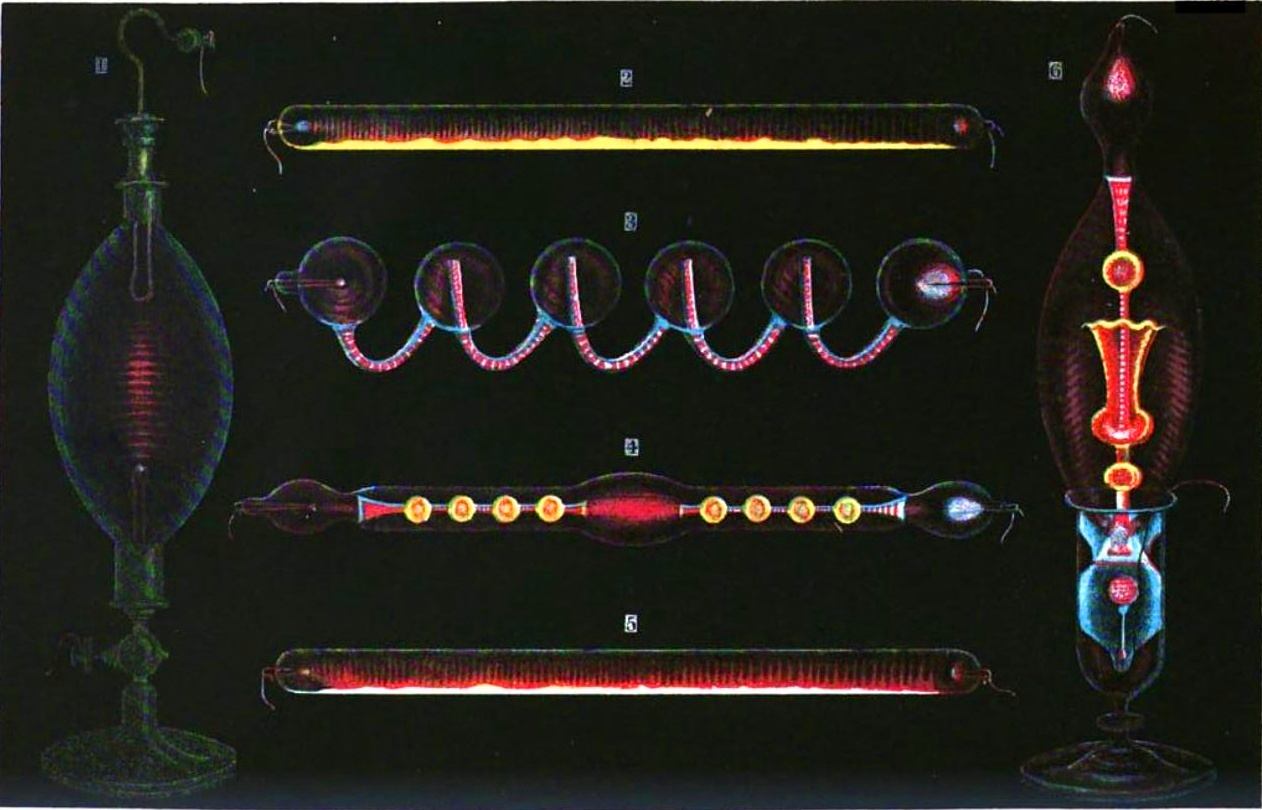
Geissler tubes, illustration from Elementary Treatise on Natural Philosophy, translated by Joseph David Everett

Everett wrote memoirs on dynamics, light, and sound, mostly expository. His main publications were:

- Units and Physical Constants'' (later The C.G.S. System of Units), 1875; 2nd ed. 1879 3rd ed. 1886; Polish transl., Warsaw, 1885.
- An Elementary Text Book of Physics, 1877; 2nd edit. 1883.
- Vibratory Motion and Sound, 1882.
- Outlines of Natural Philosophy, 1887.

He translated from Augustin Privat-Deschanel Elementary Treatise on Natural Philosophy: Physics (1870, largely rewritten; 6th edit. 1882) and, with his daughter Alice Everett, Heinrich Hovestadt's Jena Glass and its Scientific and Industrial Applications (1902).

Everett invented a system of shorthand which he published (1877 and 1883); and, a pioneer cyclist, invented a spring hub attachment for the spokes of bicycle wheels. He also introduced the so-called "gridiron" slide rule, in 1866.

== Family ==
Everett married on 3 September 1862 Jessie, daughter of Alexander Fraser, later of Ewing Place Congregational Church, Glasgow (of the Frasers of Kirkhill, Inverness), and left three daughters and three sons. The eldest was daughter Alice Everett (1865-1949), pioneering astronomer and engineer. The second son, Wilfred, became professor of engineering in the Government Engineering College, Shibpur, Calcutta.

== Notes ==
Attribution

This article incorporates text from a publication now in the public domain: Stephen, Leslie, ed. (1885). "Everett, Joseph David". Dictionary of National Biography. Vol. 1. London: Smith, Elder & Co.
