= Alice Everett =

British astronomer and engineer

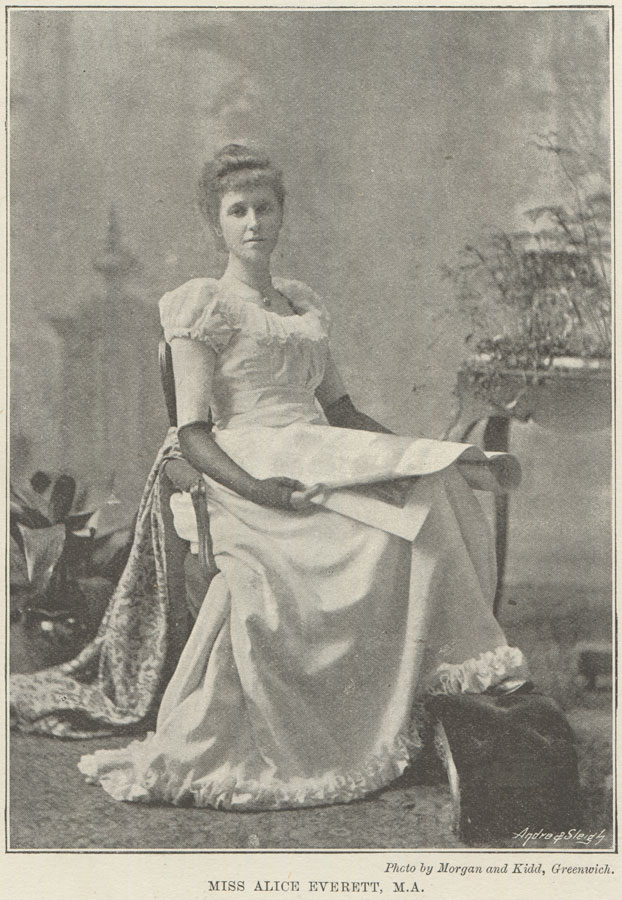
- Portrait of Alice Everett
- Born: 15 May 1865; Glasgow, Scotland
- Died: 21 July 1949 (aged 84); London, England
- Education: Girton College, Cambridge, Queen's College, Belfast
- Scientific career
- Fields: astronomy, optics, engineering
- Workplaces: Royal Observatory, Greenwich

Alice Everett (15 May 1865 – 21 July 1949) was a British astronomer and physicist. Everett is best known for being the first woman to be paid for astronomical work at the Royal Observatory, Greenwich, when she began her employment at the observatory January 1890. In 1903 she was the first woman to have a paper published by the Physical Society of London. She also contributed to the fields of optics and early television.

== Early life ==
Alice Everett was born at 105 Douglas Street in Glasgow on 15 May 1865 to Jessie (née Fraser) (1841-1924) and Joseph David Everett, FRS. She had five siblings and the family moved to Belfast when she was two when her father was appointed as Professor of Natural Philosophy at Queen's University, Belfast. Her father would remain in the post until his retirement thirty years later in 1897. Everett was educated at the Methodist College Belfast, where she was a prize winning pupil.

== University education ==
At this time, the sole means of access to a university education in Ireland for women was through the Royal University of Ireland, which awarded degrees solely through examination. In 1882 Queen's College, Belfast began accepting female students, allowing them to take lectures in preparation for the Royal University examinations. Everett applied for this option and in 1884 she was awarded first place in the first-year science examinations but the college refused to grant the scholarship to a woman. In 1886 Everett moved to the all-women's college Girton College, Cambridge. In 1887 she sat the Royal University of Ireland examination for mathematics and mathematical physics, passed with honours, and was awarded a bachelor's degree. She was awarded a Master of Arts in 1889 by the same university. Also in 1889, she passed the Mathematical Tripos at Cambridge University. Female students were permitted to sit the examinations but the university would not grant degrees to female students until 1928. 1889 marked the end of Everett's university education and the beginning of a ground-breaking career in astronomy.

== Career in astronomy ==
The UK Civil Service rules that applied at the Royal Observatory, Greenwich made the employment of women very difficult. However, in 1890 William Christie, the Astronomer Royal, was interested in employing some of the highly educated women that began graduating from English universities. He got round the regulation by paying women as supernumerary computers and not putting them on the permanent payroll. He employed four women, not as supernumerary computers but as second assistants who undertook both observations and computing. Among others he hired Everett, who became the first woman to work for the Royal Observatory, Greenwich when she began working in January 1890. At Greenwich, Everett was assigned to work in the Astrographic Department, contributing to the international Carte du Ciel star mapping project. In addition to her work as a computer, Everett was trained to use the Observatory's new astrographic telescope (installed in 1890) to take the photographs. Everett's job also involved measuring the plates, calculating the co-ordinates of the stars, and reducing the data for the catalogue. During this time, Everett also made observations for the Transit Department with the Prime-Meridian-defining Airy Transit Circle.

In 1891 Everett persuaded her friend Annie Russell to apply to work at the Royal Observatory and in September Russell began work at the observatory. She had attended Girton College with Everett and the two had sat and passed the difficult Tripos examination together. In 1892 Everett, Russell and Elizabeth Brown tried to get elected for fellowship at the Royal Astronomical Society. None of the women was admitted, because all fell short of the required votes. Similarly, the nomination of Isis Pogson had been rejected in 1886. So instead they joined and actively contributed to the amateur British Astronomical Association (BAA). Everett would publish her work in the BAA's Journal, The Observatory, Monthly Notices of the Royal Astronomical Society and elsewhere.

After five years at Greenwich, Everett became tired of the low salary and began looking for work elsewhere. She failed to get a position at the Dunsink Observatory, Dublin, and instead obtained a three-year temporary post at the Astrophysical Observatory of Potsdam, then Europe's leading institution for astrophysical research. Everett began working at the observatory as a scientific assistant in October 1895, becoming the first woman to work in an observatory in Germany. She continued to work on the Carte du Ciel project. During her time in Potsdam she measured stars on photographic chart-plates and in one year, 1897, helped measure the positions of 22,000 stars. She left Potsdam July 1899. Everett moved for a one-year post at the observatory of Vassar College in the United States where she wrote two papers with Mary Whitney. James Keeler, director of the Lick Observatory had hoped to hire her for the spectroscopic programme at the observatory but was unable to obtain funds. Instead Everett would return to London in 1900 where her interests turned from astronomy to the related field of optics. Her astronomical career came to an end at the age of 35.

== Asteroid namesake ==
In 2023, asteroid 50727 Aliceverett was named in her honor.

== Optics ==
Everett's interest in optics had been sparked when she assisted her retired father in translating an article in German on Jena optical glass. She would assist her father with his research and experiments in optics until his death in 1904. In 1903 her father communicated a paper by her to the Physical Society of London describing experiments on zonal observations in lenses, the first paper by a woman to appear in the society's journal. However opportunities for women in this field of science (or indeed any field of science) were few. As a result, Everett would be unable to find regular paid work until the First World War, which gave many women an opportunity to enter the workforce. In 1917 and at the age of fifty-two, Everett joined the staff of the National Physical Laboratory. Everett worked in the optics section until she reached the age of retirement (60) in 1925.

== Engineering and television ==
Retirement would mark the third strand of Everett's technical career, engineering. In the late 1920s Everett would take and pass examinations in wireless and electrical engineering. Everett also developed an interest in the new field of television and may have been one of two women present at the demonstration of the first television image by John Logie Baird in January 1926. As a result, Everett would become one of the founding members and Fellows of the newly established Television Society (now Royal Television Society) in September 1927. In the late 1920s and early 1930s, Everett would become involved with the Baird Television Company and Television Society and in 1933 the two would apply for a joint patent relating to television optics. Everett would continue contribution to the field of television for the rest of her life. In recognition of her contribution to the field of physics, she was granted a civil list pension of £100 in 1938. On 21 July 1949, she died in London and would leave her library of scientific books to the Television Society.

== Publications ==
- Everett, Alice (November 1891). "The Total Lunar Eclipse of November 15, 1891". Journal of the British Astronomical Association. 2 (2): 88. Bibcode:1891JBAA....2...88E.
- Everett, Alice (March 1892). "On the photographic Magnitude of Nova Aurigae". Journal of the British Astronomical Association. 2 (6): 276–278. Bibcode:1892JBAA....2..276E.
- Everett, Alice (March 1894). "Total Eclipse of the Sun, August 9, 1896". Journal of the British Astronomical Association. 4: 246. Bibcode:1894JBAA....4..246E.
- Everett, Alice (June 1895). "Note on the binary ι Leonis". Monthly Notices of the Royal Astronomical Society. 55: 440–441. Bibcode:1895MNRAS..55..440E. doi:10.1093/mnras/55.8.440.
- Everett, Alice (June 1896). "Galactic Longitude and Latitude of Poles of Binary Star Orbits". Monthly Notices of the Royal Astronomical Society. 56 (9): 462–466. Bibcode:1896MNRAS..56..462E. doi:10.1093/mnras/56.9.462.
- Everett, Alice (December 1902). "Photographs of Cross-sections of Hollow Pencils formed by Oblique Transmission through an Annulus of a Lens". Journal of the British Astronomical Association. 13 (2): 74–75. Bibcode:1902JBAA...13...74E.
- Everett, Alice (May 1903). "The Jena Glass Works, with special reference to Astronomical Objectives". Journal of the British Astronomical Association. 13 (7): 275–277. Bibcode:1903JBAA...13..275E.
- Everett, Alice (June 1912). "Clouds and Shadows" (PDF). Nature. 89 (2226): 426. Bibcode:1912Natur..89..426E. doi:10.1038/089426a0. S2CID 3982436.
- Everett, Alice (March 1925). "The Translation of Helmholtz's Physiological Optics" (PDF). Nature. 115 (2890): 424. Bibcode:1925Natur.115..424E. doi:10.1038/115424b0. S2CID 4083281.
