= Couder (crater) =

Crater on the Moon

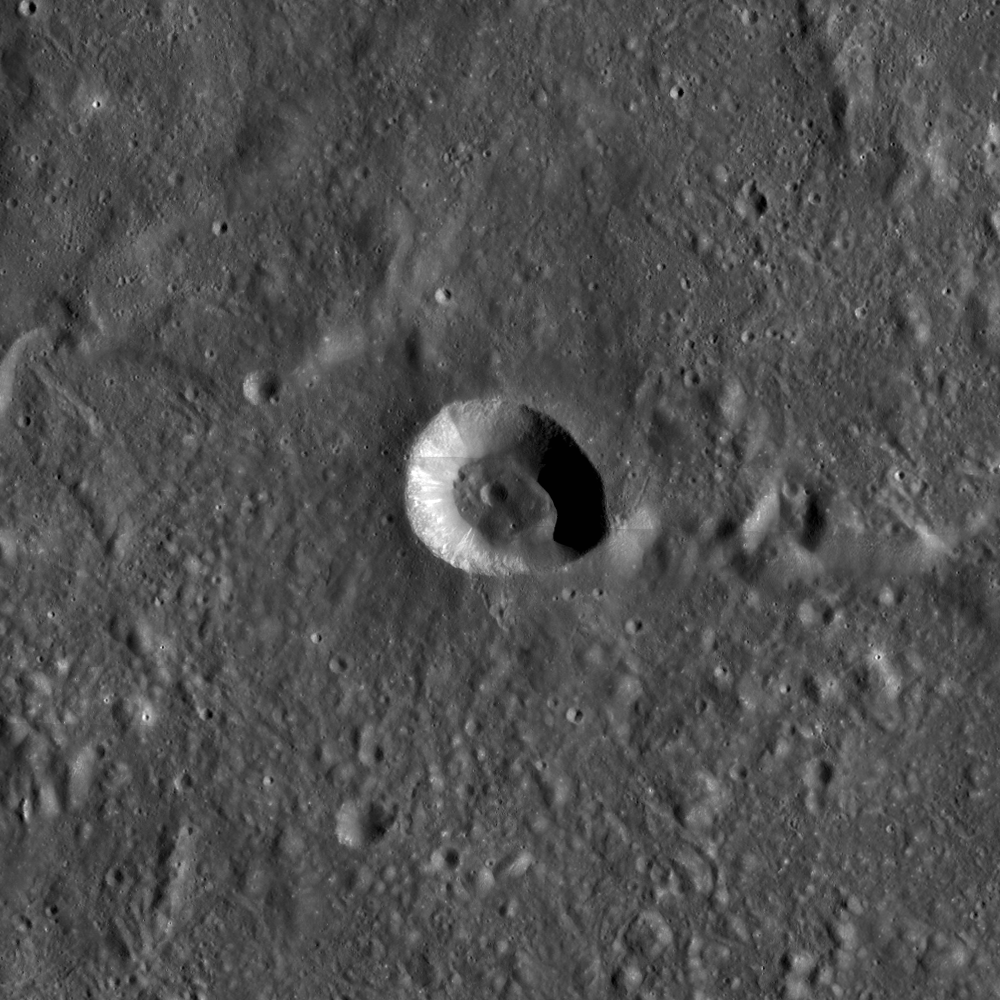
- LROC image
- Coordinates: 4.8°S 92.4°W
- Diameter: 18.56 km (11.53 mi)
- Depth: Unknown
- Colongitude: 93° at sunrise
- Eponym: André Couder

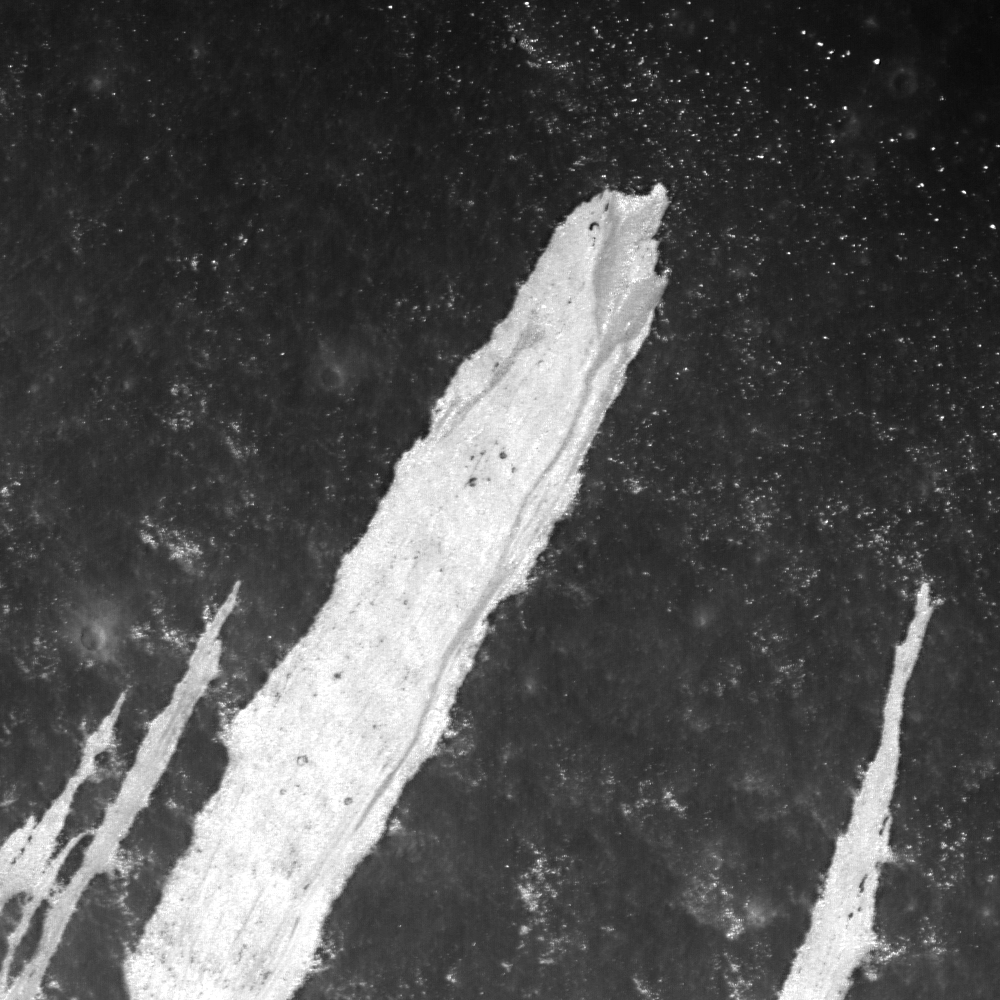
Evidence of recent debris flows in the interior of Couder, from LRO

Couder is a small lunar impact crater that is located just behind the western limb of the Moon, in a region of the surface that is brought into view during favorable librations. It lies on the inner foothills of the Montes Cordillera, a ring-shaped mountain range that surrounds the Mare Orientale impact basin. This region is relatively devoid of major craters, with the nearest being Schlüter almost due east. Slightly farther to the south of Couder is Maunder, at the edge of the mare.

This is a bowl-shaped crater with a sharp rim and an interior floor about half the diameter of the crater. The crater is slightly to the southwest, where the inner wall is also at its widest. It is otherwise an undistinguished crater formation. Images from the Lunar Reconnaissance Orbiter camera show hundreds of boulder trails on the inner walls of Couder, particularly along the northern wall. These are the results of impact events or shallow seismic activity in the area.

Previously identified as Maunder Z, this crater is named after French astronomer André Couder (1897-1979). Its designation was officially adopted by the International Astronomical Union in 1985.
