= André Couder =

French optician and astronomer

- Born: 27 November 1897; Alençon
- Died: January 16, 1979 (aged 81); Paris
- Resting place: Bourg-la-Reine
- Education: Chimie ParisTech
- Occupations: optician and astronomer
- Board member of: Société astronomique de France (SAF)
- Awards: Valz Prize; Janssen Medal; Prix Jules Janssen (Société astronomique de France)

André Couder (27 November 1897 – 16 January 1979) was a French optician and astronomer.

== Information ==
From 1925, he worked in the optics laboratory of the Paris Observatory. Between 1952 and 1958 he was vice-president of the International Astronomical Union. A lunar crater, Couder, is named for him. He was awarded the Valz Prize in 1936, the Janssen Medal from the French Academy of Sciences in 1952, and the Prix Jules Janssen from the Société astronomique de France in 1953.

Couder was the President of the Société astronomique de France from 1955-1957. The Couder crater on the Moon is name after him.
