= Annie S. D. Maunder =

Irish astronomer (1868–1947)

Annie S. D. Maunder FRAS
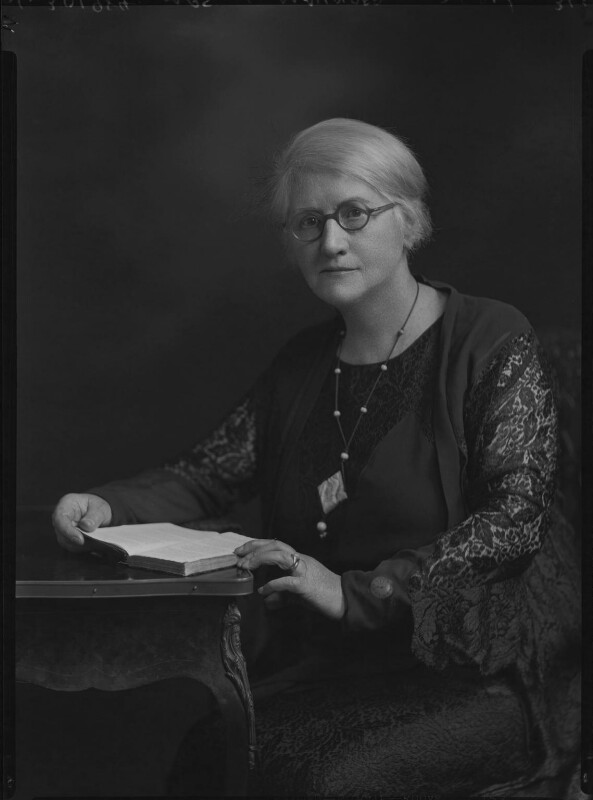
- Annie S. D. Maunder in 1931
- Born: Annie Scott Dill Russell; 14 April 1868; Strabane, County Tyrone, Ireland
- Died: 15 September 1947 (aged 79); Wandsworth, London, England
- Education: Victoria College, Belfast; Girton College, Cambridge
- Known for: Maunder Minimum
- Spouse: Edward Walter Maunder (m. 1851–1928)
- Scientific career
- Fields: Solar astronomy
- Workplaces: Royal Observatory, Greenwich

Annie Scott Dill Maunder (née Russell; 14 April 1868 – 15 September 1947) was an Irish astronomer, who recorded the first evidence of the movement of the sunspot emergence from the poles toward the equator over the 11-year solar cycle, finding the now-called Maunder Minimum. As sole author, she also devised with her husband, Edward Walter Maunder, the butterfly diagram for sunspots. Alone, she discovered that the sunspots in the Sun were asymmetrical. She was one of the leading astronomers of her time, but because of her gender, her contribution was often underplayed at the time. In 1916, she was elected to the Royal Astronomical Society, 21 years after being refused membership because of her gender.

== Early life and education ==
Annie Scott Dill Russell was born in 1868 in The Manse, Strabane, County Tyrone, Ireland, to William Andrew Russell and Hessy Nesbitt Russell (née Dill). Her father was the minister of the Presbyterian Church in Strabane until 1882. Her mother was the daughter of a minister at the same church. Annie was one of six children brought up in a devoutly Christian household with a "serious minded upbringing." All of the children were talented, high-level academics. Her older sister, Hester Dill Russell (later Smith), studied medicine under Elizabeth Garrett Anderson at the London School of Medicine for Women. Hester qualified as the first exhibitioner in the final MB examination in 1891. Hester became a medical missionary in India and later married another medical missionary.

Annie and her sister Hester pursued secondary education at the Ladies Collegiate School in Belfast, which later became Victoria College. Winning a prize in an 1886 intermediate school examination at the age of 18, Annie was able to sit the Girton open entrance scholarship examination and was awarded a three-year scholarship of £35 annually.

Annie studied at Girton College, Cambridge, and in 1889 she passed the degree examinations with honours, as the top mathematician of her year at Girton. Here, she also ranked Senior Optime (equivalent to second class at other universities) in the university results list. Annie was the first woman from Ireland to receive this rank. Her mathematician tutor was a fellow of a men's college. He praised her for ability to "throw herself into her work with such success, in spite of being more than ordinarily handicapped, even for a woman, with insufficiency of preliminary training". However the restrictions of the period did not allow her to receive the bachelor's degree she had earned; Cambridge did not award degrees to women until 1948.

== Personal life ==
Annie, aged 27, married Walter, aged 45, in a Presbyterian church in Greenwich on 28 December 1895. Walter and Annie had no children together; although, Walter had five children from a previous marriage. Annie was 17 years younger than Walter and only nine years older than his oldest son. The oldest of the children was 21 and the youngest was 7. Annie was described as having an active mind and a "lively imagination combined with a tireless zeal in seeking evidence and working out details before presenting any conclusions." Walter died in 1928 at the age of 76. Annie died almost two decades later, aged 79, in Wandsworth, London in 1947.

== Astronomical research ==
=== Career at the Royal Observatory ===
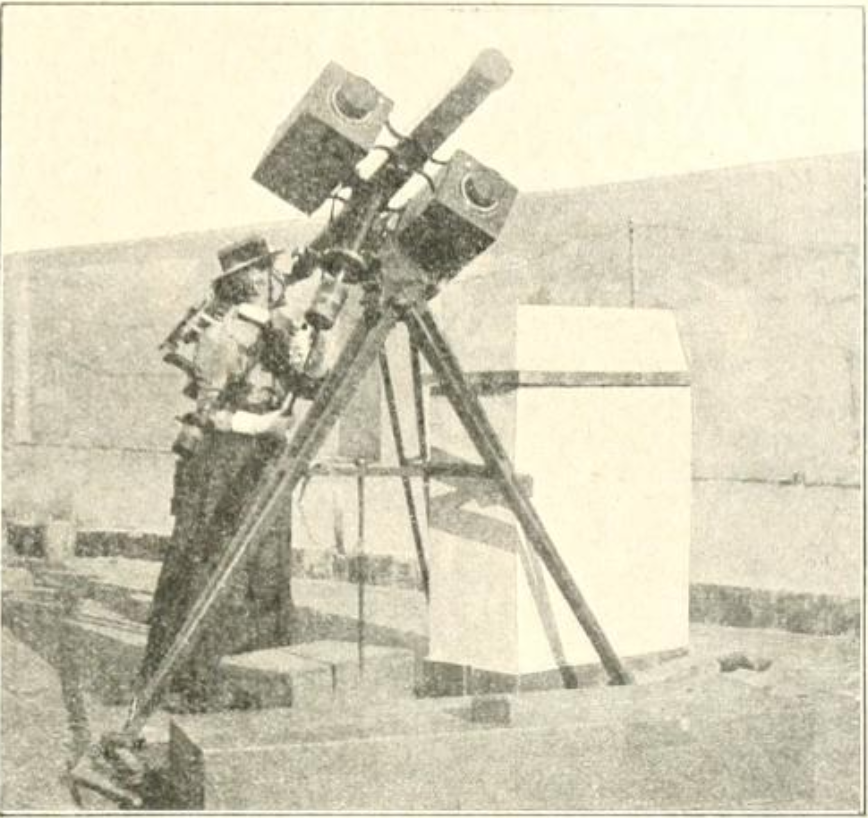
Annie Maunder and her two cameras, at work in Algiers in 1900. Photographed by her stepdaughter Edith Maunder.

In January 1890, Annie was told about a position at Greenwich that was available by her good friend Alice Everett. In response, Annie wrote many times to the Royal Observatory hoping to be considered for the position. Annie's father submitted a request for her to obtain the job, and a powerful promoter, Sir Robert Ball, wrote her a letter of recommendation. For a year, Annie worked as a mathematics mistress at the Ladies' High School on the island of Jersey until she was offered the position by the Chief Assistant, Herbert Hall Turner. In 1891, Annie began her work at the Royal Observatory, Greenwich, serving as one of the "lady computers" assigned to the solar department. This was a special department set up in 1873 to photograph the sun. Annie was offered £4 a month which she regarded as being barely enough to live on, as a teacher she had made £80 a year and was provided housing.

Annie worked under Walter Maunder on the Greenwich photoheliograph program. Her duties included using the Dallmeyer photo-heliograph to capture pictures of sunspots, find their location, and determine their properties. There, Annie assisted Walter Maunder, and she spent a great deal of time photographing the sun. She also tracked the movements of a great number of sunspots caused by the solar maximum of 1894. This included the giant sunspot of July 1892 which was caused by a magnetic storm resulting in the largest spot ever record at Greenwich at the time. In 1891, her first year at Greenwich, the number of recorded observations in the solar department exceeded 7 times the average number of recordings for the past 35 years. While she was not credited for this, Walter Maunder nominated her for the Fellowship of the Royal Astronomical Society in 1892. In November 1894, she was made editor of the Journal of the British Astronomical Association (BAA) by her husband who was president at the time. She kept this position for 35 years.

=== Collaboration with Walter ===
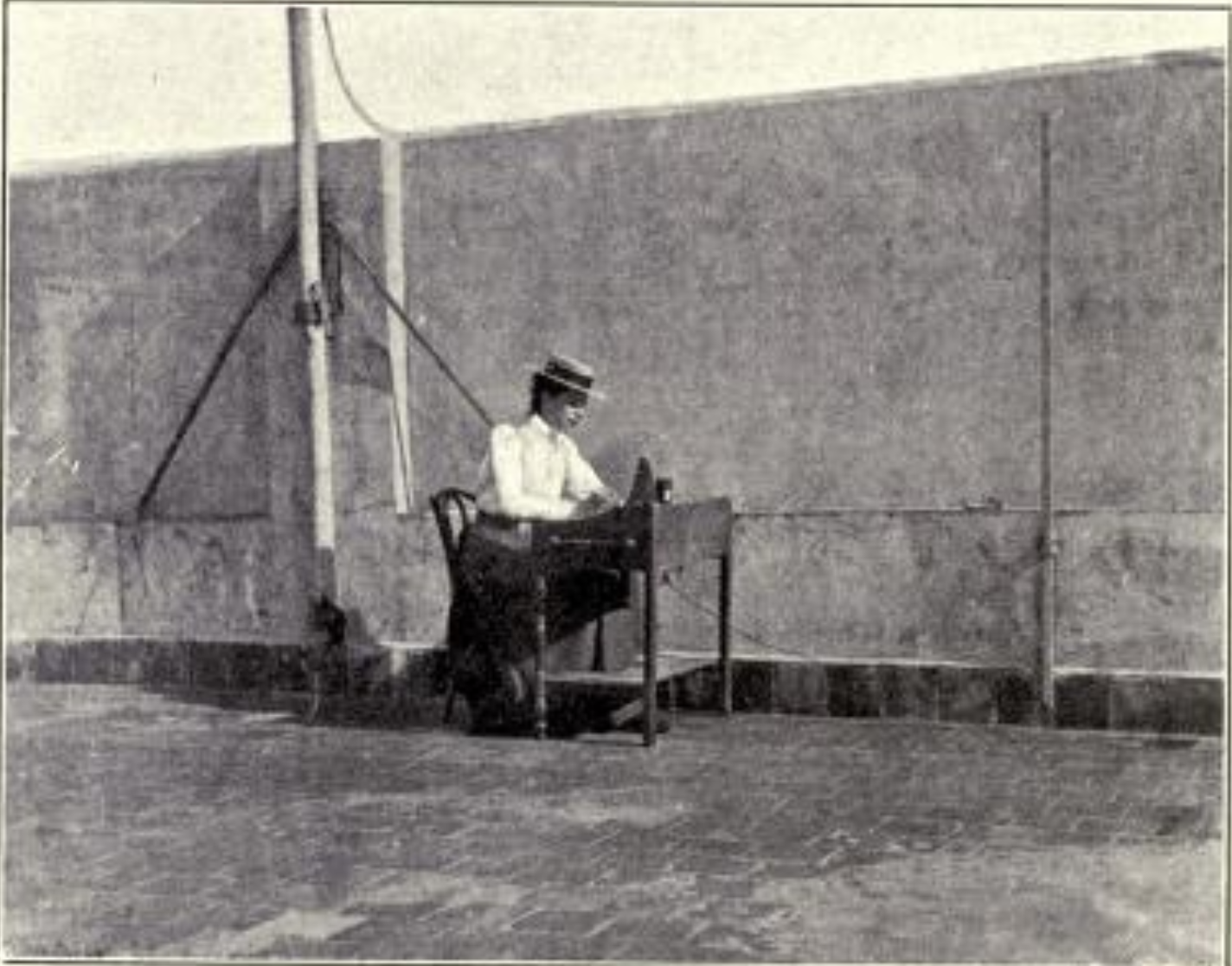
Edith Maunder calling time on the solar eclipse in Algier, 1900.

Annie and Walter were married in 1895, and Annie was required to resign from her job due to restrictions on married women working in public service. It is believed that "the lady computer scheme began as an experiment, was destined to have a time limit and was not repeated". Forty years passed before another woman astronomer was hired alongside men at the Royal Observatory. However, the two continued to collaborate, and Annie accompanied Walter on solar eclipse expeditions. Walter was in charge of financing and organizing expeditions through the National Eclipse Committee of the Royal Observatory of Greenwich. Annie took part in five eclipse expeditions with the BAA, her first in 1896 in Norway. For the Maunders expedition to India in 1898, Walter was not a designated member of the expedition, so he and Annie went on their own.

In 1897, Annie received a grant from Girton College to acquire a short-focus camera with a 1.5-inch lens which she took on expeditions. The lens used was made by T.R. Dallmeyer, a famous London optician. She used this camera in India to photograph the outer solar corona in the Solar eclipse of January 22, 1898. With this camera she captured the longest ray, coronal streamer, seen at the time with her own equipment that she operated and designed herself. It was made with a large field-of-view for photographing the Milky Way, which made it possible to look for faint and distant corona. Annie took a series of photographs with her camera and ranging exposures during the couple minutes of the totality of the eclipse. Her photographs recorded a stream from the Sun that extended over 10 million kilometres. The Irish science writer Agnes Clerke observed, "Mrs. Maunder with her tiny lens has beaten all the big instruments." Annie's description of the direction and motion of the particles in the corona which she observed, describes the now accepted Parker Spiral structure of the solar wind.

In 1900 Annie, along with other members of the BAA, travelled to Algiers to observe the total Solar eclipse of May 28, 1900. Annie's stepdaughters Edith and Irene joined the observation, with Edith keeping time and Irene taking photographs; Irene published an account of her experience of the eclipse in the BAA journal. The members of the association that accompanied her were Mary Acworth Evershed, Lilian Martin-Leake, and C O Stevens. She photographed the corona and observed "plume" like rays, coining the term which is still used today.

In May 1901, the Maunders went on a solar expedition in Mauritius in which Annie was not included as an official observer (though her husband Walter was) and had to pay her own way. Since Annie was not an official observer, she decided to go to a separate location to photograph the eclipse. Of the two Mauritius corona photographs that were published, one was Walter's and one was Annie's. The only expedition in which Annie's expenses were paid for was the expedition to Canada where the Maunders were invited and sponsored by the Canadian Government.

=== Publications ===
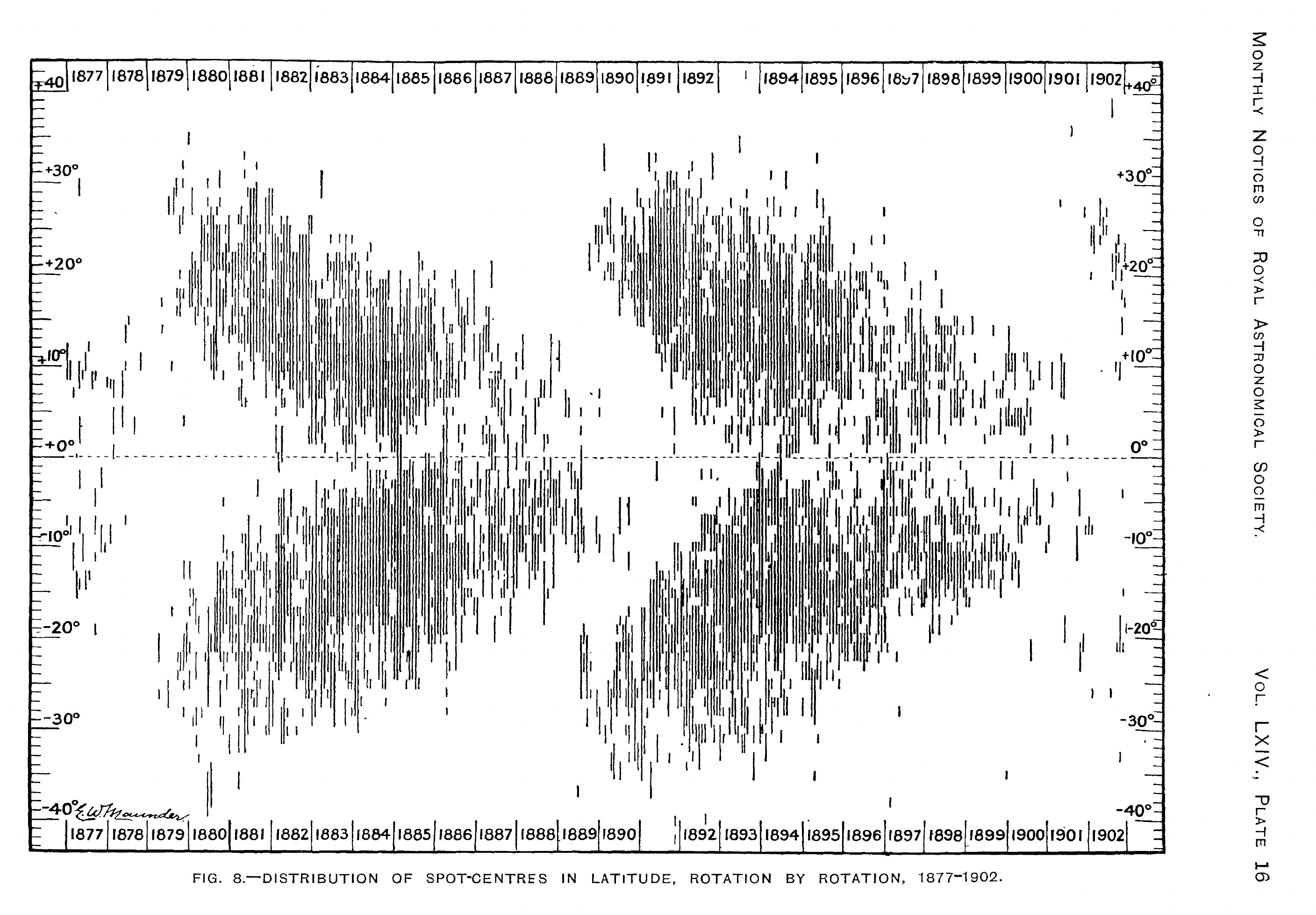
1904 butterfly diagram by the Maunders

In 1904, Annie and Walter created the butterfly diagram to analyse sunspots, showing the latitude of the sunspots over time. The butterfly diagram "is one of the most powerful representations of the inner workings of the Sun". The paper originally had two desiccated butterflies but a third was added after the 11 to 12-year course. Annie was not published as coauthor on her husband's paper over the butterfly diagram. In 1943 Sydney Chapman, President of the Royal Society used the butterfly diagram as the subject of his 1943 presidential address, an honour for something she considered as her "most cherished pieces of work". The butterfly diagram is currently in the High Altitude Observatory. Annie gave the butterfly diagram to Walter Orr Roberts (the director of the High Altitude Observatory) during the Second World War.

Annie co-authored with her husband on some papers. In 1907, she published a paper covering "an analysis of the formidable sunspot data-set that had been gathered at the ROG, covering 1889–1901" as sole author. This analysis contained data that took 13 years to collect, and 19 tables of results. In this paper she found east–west asymmetries in sunspots, a controversial finding which she could not explain. Years later, Arthur Schuster, a famous physicist, confirmed her findings and suggested an explanation for the asymmetry. Modern science and data has also confirmed her observations on the asymmetrical nature of the sunspots. Annie published The Heavens and their Story in 1908, with her husband Walter as co-author. (She was credited by her husband as the primary author.) The book was written for the amateur readers, containing her photographs of the sun and the Milky Way, in hopes to draw in more people to the field of astronomy. The book discusses the sudden terrestrial magnetic storms coinciding with the sunspots' rotation period which was seen in the 1898 eclipse in India. The Maunders thought that the magnetic storms were made of positively and negatively charged electrified particles, an "insight [that] far predates better-known statements on the same matter, and has much in common with our present-day understanding".

- Maunder, A S D; Maunder, H D (November 1897). "Hints for Board Ship and Tent Life in India during the Eclipse Expedition of 1898". Journal of the British Astronomical Association. 8 (1): 38–39. Bibcode:1897JBAA....8...38R.
- Maunder, A S D; Maunder, E W (January 1898). "Expedition for the Observation of the Total Solar Eclipse, August 9th, 1896. Mr. and Mrs. Maunder's Report". Memoirs of the British Astronomical Association. 6 (1): 20–21. Bibcode:1898MmBAA...6...20M.
- Maunder, A S D; Maunder, E W (February 1898). "The Zodiacal Light". Journal of the British Astronomical Association. 8 (4): 174–176. Bibcode:1898JBAA....8..174W.
- Maunder, A S D (January 1902). "Preliminary note on observations of the Total Solar Eclipse of 1901 May 18, made at Pamplemousses, Mauritius". Monthly Notices of the Royal Astronomical Society. 62: 57–63. Bibcode:1902MNRAS..62A..57M. doi:10.1093/mnras/62.1.57.
- Maunder, A S D; Maunder, E W (July 1903). "Some Experiments on the Limits of Vision for Lines and Spots as applicable to the Question of the Actuality of the Canals of Mars". Journal of the British Astronomical Association. 13 (9): 344. Bibcode:1903JBAA...13..344M.
- Maunder, A S D; Maunder, E W (March 1904). "Date of Passage of the Vernal Equinox from Taurus into Aries". Monthly Notices of the Royal Astronomical Society. 64: 488–505. Bibcode:1904MNRAS..64..488M. doi:10.1093/mnras/64.5.488.
- Maunder, A S D; Maunder, E W (April 1904). "The Oldest Astronomy III". Journal of the British Astronomical Association. 14 (6): 241–426. Bibcode:1904JBAA...14..241M.
- Maunder, A S D; Maunder, E W (June 1905). "Rotation Period of the Sun from Greenwich Sun-spot Measures, 1879–1901". Monthly Notices of the Royal Astronomical Society. 65: 813–825. Bibcode:1905MNRAS..65..813M. doi:10.1093/mnras/65.8.813.
- Maunder, A S D (May 1907). "An Apparent Influence of the Earth on the Numbers and Areas of Sun-spots in the Cycle 1889-1901". Monthly Notices of the Royal Astronomical Society. 67 (7): 451–476. doi:10.1093/mnras/67.7.451.
- Maunder, A S D (January 1909). "Catalogue of Recurrent Groups of Sun Spots for the Years 1874 to 1906 Compiled by Mrs. Annie S. D. Maunder, from the Ledgers of Groups of Sun Spots Published in the Greenwich Observations, 1886–1907". Greenwich Observations in Astronomy, Magnetism and Meteorology Made at the Royal Observatory. Series 2. 69: O1–O50. Bibcode:1909GOAMM..69O...1M.
- Maunder, A S D (August 1907). "The "Highways" and the "Waterways" of Mars". Knowledge & Scientific News. 4 (8): 169–171.
- Maunder, A S D (June 1911). "An Apparent Influence of the Earth on the Numbers and Areas of Sun-spots in the Cycle 1889–1901". The Observatory. 34 (436): 236–239. Bibcode:1911Obs....34..236M.
- Maunder, A S D (October 1912). "The Date of the Bundahis". The Observatory. 35 (453): 362–367. Bibcode:1912Obs....35..362M.
- Maunder, A S D (November 1912). "The Zoroastrian Star-Champions". The Observatory. 35 (454): 393–396. Bibcode:1912Obs....35..393M.
- Maunder, A S D (December 1912). "The Zoroastrian Star-Champions". The Observatory. 35 (455): 438–443. Bibcode:1912Obs....35..438M.
- Maunder, A S D (March 1913). "The Zoroastrian Star-Champions". The Observatory. 36 (459): 136–141. Bibcode:1913Obs....36..136M.
- Maunder, A S D; Maunder, E W (January 1923). "La Période de Rotation du Soleil d'après les Orages Magnétiques". Bulletin de l'Observatoire de Lyon. 6: 19–21. Bibcode:1923BuLyo...6...19M.
- Maunder, A S D; Maunder, E W (June 1924). "The Rotation Period of the Sun as Derived from Magnetic Storms". Monthly Notices of the Royal Astronomical Society. 84 (8): 610–615. Bibcode:1924MNRAS..84..610M. doi:10.1093/mnras/84.8.610.
- Maunder, A S D (August 1934). "The Origin of the Symbols of the Planets". The Observatory. 57 (723): 238–247. Bibcode:1934Obs....57..238M.
- Maunder, A S D (September 1934). "Old Cometary Records". The Observatory. 57 (724): 278–281. Bibcode:1934Obs....57..278M.
- Maunder, A S D (December 1936). "The Origin of the Constellations". The Observatory. 59 (751): 367–375. Bibcode:1936Obs....59..367M.

=== Fellowship at the Royal Astronomical Society ===
She was elected as a Fellow of the Royal Astronomical Society (RAS) in November 1916, ten months after the bar on female Fellows was lifted. She had become a member of the BAA on 25 November 1891, just over a year since Walter participated in its foundation in 1890. Annie had two stints as the editor of the BAA Journal initially from 1894 to 1896 and then from 1917 to 1930. Although Walter had been fellow of the RAS since 1875, he wanted an association of people from every class of society who were interested in astronomy, especially open for women. Annie had first been nominated for election to the RAS 24 years earlier due strongly in part to Walter's recommendation. Along with her were two additional nominees, Elizabeth Brown and Alice Everett. None of the three women received the three-quarters vote at the April 1892 meeting that was required for election. One Fellow specifically implied that the women would largely serve as a distraction and simply a social element to the meetings without contributing much of worth. Annie did not take lightly to the prejudice against her and other women throughout her field occupied largely by men, and she especially did not agree with the results of the 1892 RAS election.

== Legacy ==
The crater Maunder on the Moon is jointly named for Walter and Annie Maunder, as is the Maunder Minimum.

In 2016 the RAS established the Annie Maunder medal for an outstanding contribution to outreach and public engagement in astronomy or geophysics.

In June 2018 it was announced that the Royal Observatory, Greenwich had installed a new telescope in its Altazimuth Pavilion, the Annie Maunder Astrographic Telescope (AMAT), as part of a revival of telescopy in London enabled by cleaner air and advanced technology. There is also to be an exhibition about Maunder's story, on the ground floor of the building.

In March 2022 English Heritage unveiled a blue plaque to Annie and Walter Maunder at their former home in Brockley, south London. The Maunders wrote The Heavens and their Story (1908) while they were living in Brockley.

On 1 April 2022, a satellite named after her (ÑuSat 23 or "Annie", COSPAR 2022-033M) was launched into space as part of the Satellogic Aleph-1 constellation.

In 2023 an asteroid was named after Maunder; it is called Anniemaunder.
