= Hedin (crater) =

Crater on the Moon

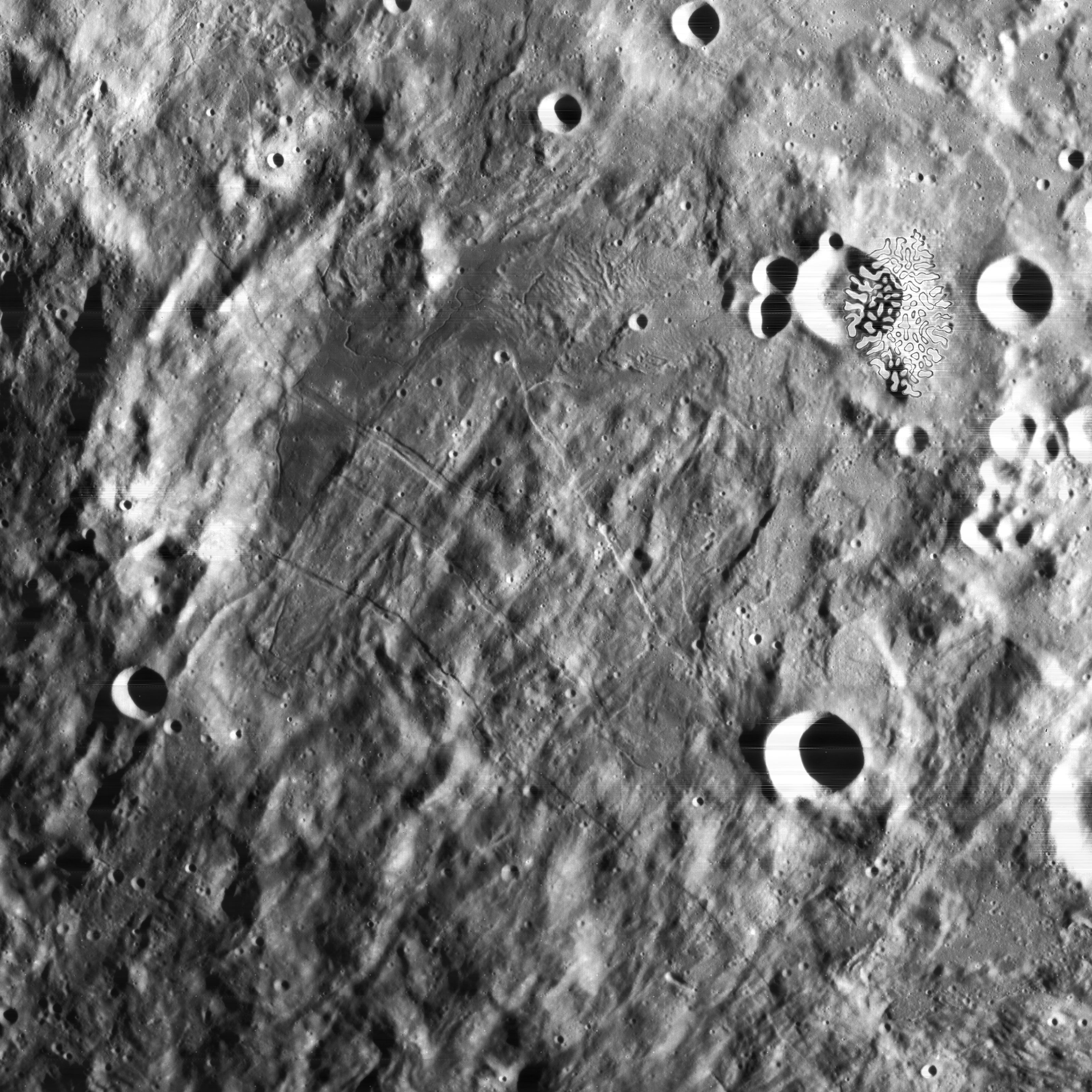
- Lunar Orbiter 4 image
- Coordinates: 2.0°N 76.5°W
- Diameter: 150 km
- Depth: Unknown
- Colongitude: 77° at sunrise
- Eponym: Sven A. Hedin

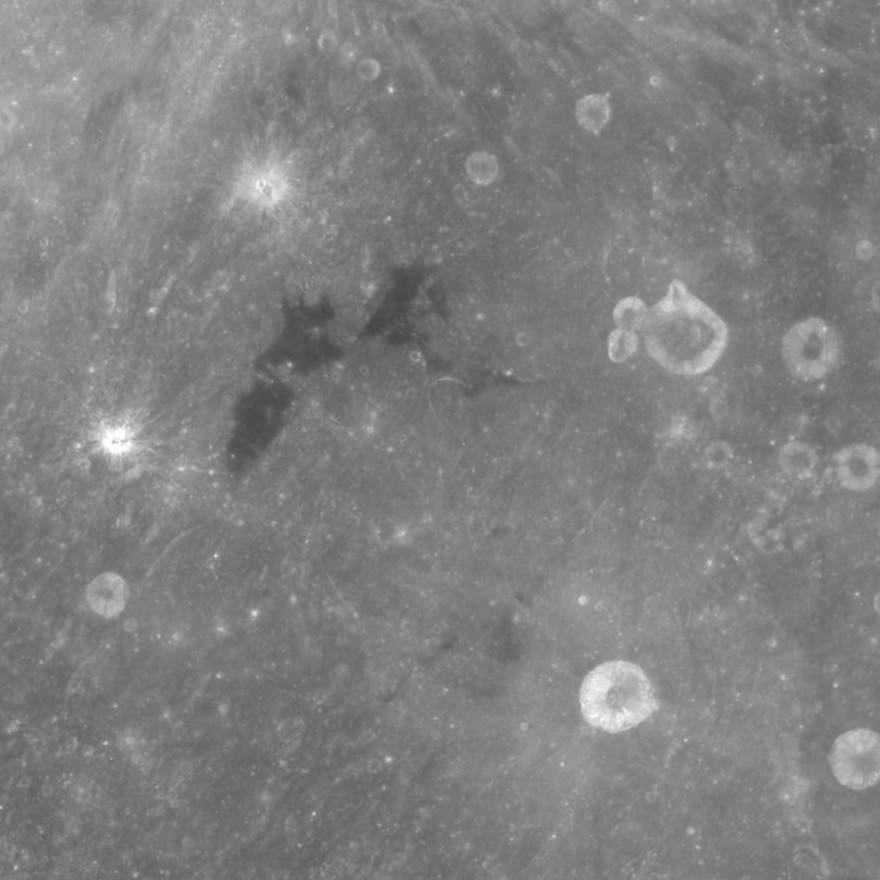
Clementine mosaic of Hedin. Eroded crater rim is practically invisible at this high sun angle, but the dark mare deposit is prominent.

Hedin is a lunar impact crater of the dimension traditionally termed a walled plain. It lies due south of the crater pair Olbers and Glushko, and northwest of the similarly dimensioned walled plain Riccioli. To the east is another walled plain, Hevelius.

This crater has a deteriorated outer rim that has been worn down and reshaped through impact erosion. Several small craters lie along or near the rim, including Hedin F to the northeast and Hedin H to the southeast.

The interior floor has been scored by the impact event that created the Mare Orientale to the southeast. But these features are cross-hatched by a pair of linear rilles that follow a path towards the southeast. Only a section of the floor along the northwest rim is relatively level, retaining the low albedo of ground that has been resurfaced by lava.

This crater is sometimes referred to as "Sven Hedin" in older publications. It is named after Swedish explorer Sven A. Hedin (1865–1952).

== Satellite craters ==
By convention these features are identified on lunar maps by placing the letter on the side of the crater midpoint that is closest to Hedin.

Hedin	Latitude	Longitude	Diameter
A	5.5° N	78.1° W	60 km
B	4.4° N	83.7° W	20 km
C	4.4° N	84.6° W	10 km
F	4.0° N	74.4° W	19 km
G	3.8° N	73.4° W	14 km
H	3.0° N	72.2° W	11 km
K	2.9° N	73.0° W	11 km
L	5.1° N	71.3° W	10 km
N	4.9° N	71.7° W	24 km
R	5.3° N	75.9° W	7 km
S	5.7° N	75.1° W	8 km
T	4.2° N	72.8° W	7 km
V	5.2° N	73.7° W	9 km
Z	1.9° N	78.9° W	10 km
