= Olbers (crater) =

Crater on the Moon

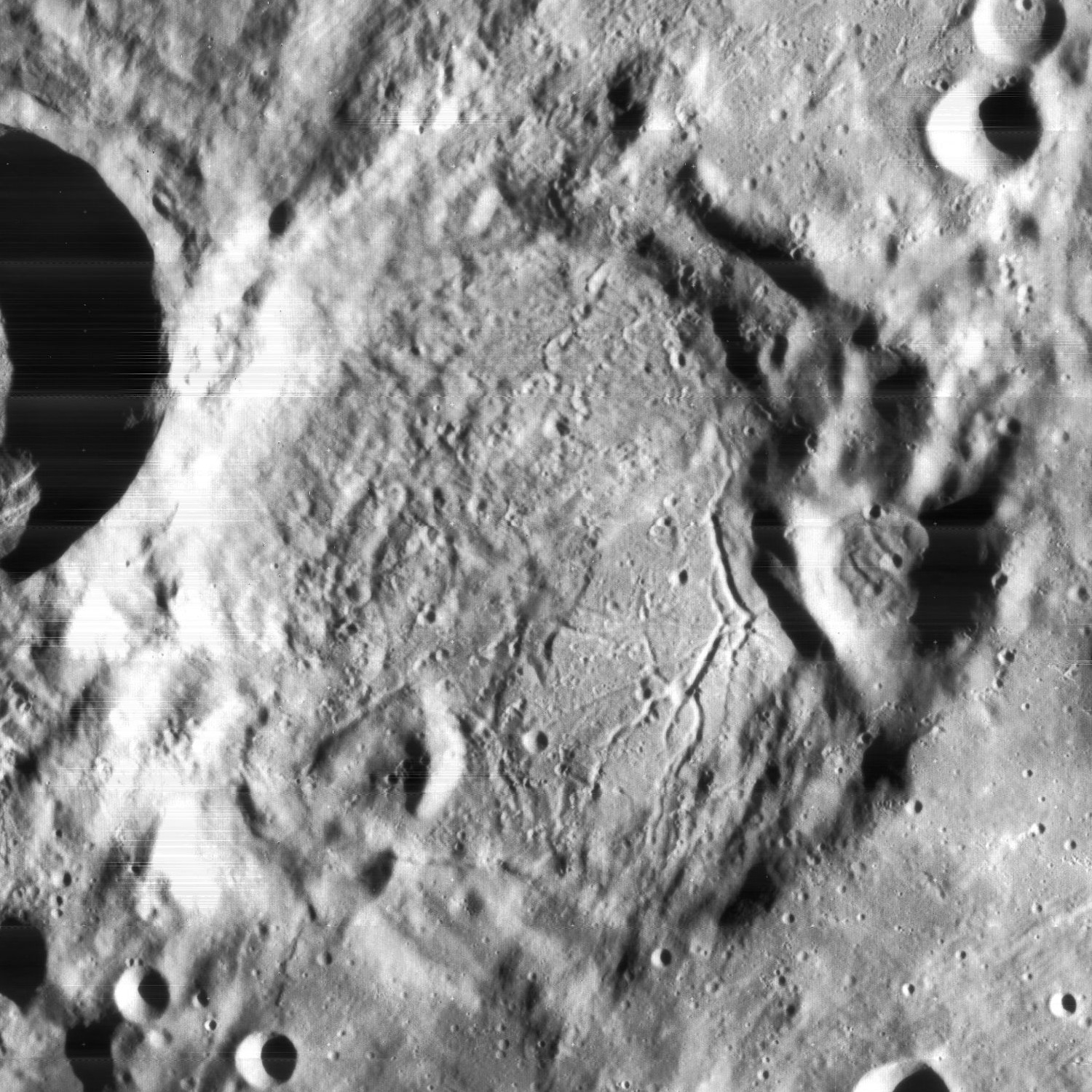
- Lunar Orbiter 4 image
- Coordinates: 7.4°N 75.9°W
- Diameter: 74 km
- Depth: 3.0 km
- Colongitude: 76° at sunrise
- Eponym: Heinrich W. M. Olbers

Olbers is a lunar impact crater that lies at the west edge of the Oceanus Procellarum, near the western limb of the Moon. It lies to the northwest of the crater Hevelius, and to the north of the indistinct Hedin. Farther to the south is the crater Riccioli. Due to its location, this crater appears very oblong because of foreshortening. It is viewed nearly edge-on, making observation of the interior difficult from the Earth.

The rim of Olbers is somewhat worn, with notches to the north, east, and south. The interior floor is relatively flat, especially toward the eastern rim, and is not marked by notable craterlets. The floor is covered by ray material and ejecta from the adjacent Glushko.

== Satellite craters ==
By convention these features are identified on lunar maps by placing the letter on the side of the crater midpoint that is closest to Olbers.

Olbers	Latitude	Longitude	Diameter
B	6.8° N	74.1° W	16 km
D	10.2° N	78.2° W	116 km
G	8.4° N	74.5° W	10 km
H	8.7° N	74.4° W	8 km
K	6.8° N	78.2° W	24 km
M	8.0° N	81.2° W	33 km
N	9.0° N	79.7° W	22 km
S	6.8° N	76.7° W	21 km
V	9.1° N	73.0° W	7 km
W	5.9° N	81.5° W	18 km
Y	6.5° N	83.6° W	21 km

The following crater has been renamed by the IAU:

- Olbers A — See Glushko (crater).
