= Riccioli (disambiguation) =

Giovanni Battista Riccioli (1598 – 1671) was an Italian astronomer.

Riccioli could also refer to:

- 122632 Riccioli, a minor planet
- Riccioli (crater), a crater on the Moon
