= Lohrmann (crater) =

Lunar impact crater

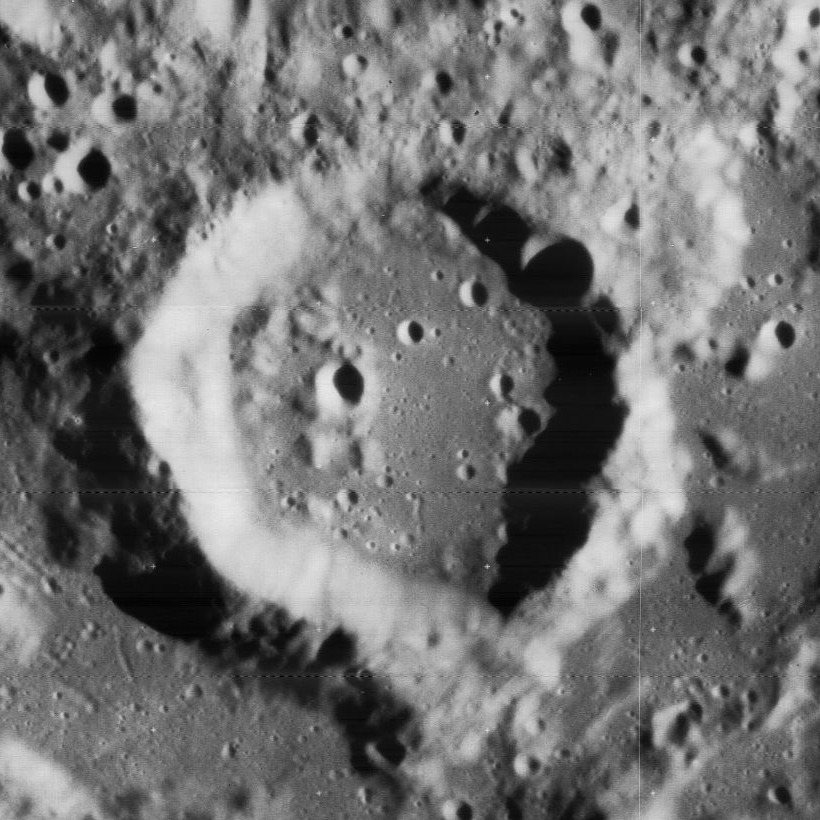
- Lunar Orbiter 4 image
- Coordinates: 0.5°S 67.2°W
- Diameter: 31 km
- Depth: 1.7 km
- Colongitude: 68° at sunrise
- Eponym: Wilhelm G. Lohrmann

Lohrmann is a small lunar impact crater that is located to the west of the Oceanus Procellarum, near the western limb of the Moon. It lies to the north of the dark-floored walled plain named Grimaldi, and just to the south of the crater Hevelius.

This crater is nearly circular, although it does not appear so from the Earth due to foreshortening. It has a narrow inner wall at the north end and a somewhat eroded edge. The interior floor has some low hills and a small craterlet in the western half. The remainder of the floor is relatively featureless except for some tiny craters. The infrared spectrum of pure crystalline plagioclase has been identified on the central floor.

== Bright satellite crater Lohrmann A ==
During and after full moon, crater Lohrmann is difficult to detect and to observe. Bright satellite crater Lohrmann A, east of Lohrmann, at the dark western rim of Oceanus Procellarum, is a guide to find the location of Lohrmann. East of Lohrmann A and north of the bright satellite crater Grimaldi C is the location of a small officially unnamed swirl formation. The brightness of satellite craters Lohrmann A and Grimaldi C is also noticeable on the photographic version of chart LAC 74 (page 148) in The Clementine Atlas of the Moon (Ben Bussey / Paul D. Spudis). Also captured on LAC 74 is the small swirl formation east of Lohrmann A.

== Satellite craters ==
By convention these features are identified on lunar maps by placing the letter on the side of the crater midpoint that is closest to Lohrmann.

Lohrmann	Latitude	Longitude	Diameter
A	0.7° S	62.7° W	12 km
B	0.7° S	69.4° W	14 km
D	0.1° S	65.2° W	11 km
E	1.7° S	67.4° W	10 km
F	1.4° S	69.1° W	11 km
M	0.5° S	68.9° W	7 km
N	0.6° S	70.1° W	8 km
