= Wilhelm Gotthelf Lohrmann =

Saxon cartographer, astronomer, and meteorologist (1796–1840)

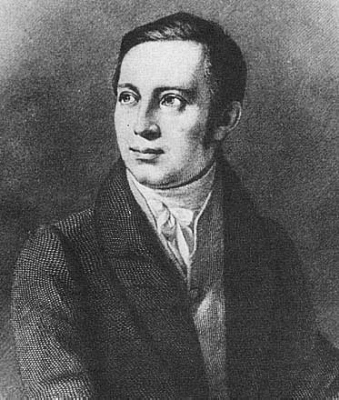
Wilhelm Gotthelf Lohrmann

Wilhelm Gotthelf Lohrmann (31 January 1796 – 20 February 1840) was a Saxon cartographer, astronomer, meteorologist and patron of the sciences.

He was born in Dresden, the son of a brickmaster. In 1810 he attended school at the Pfeilschmidtschen Garnisonsschule, then studied architecture. His mother died in 1812, his father in 1817, and his first wife Christiane Amalie died in 1827. The couple had married in 1819, and she had borne six children. Wilhelm would marry again in 1828 to Henriette.

In 1821 he made observations of the Moon, enabling him to produce a Mondkärtchen (lunar map). This map was further developed in 1824 as Topographie der sichtbaren Mondoberfläche ("Topography of the visible surface of the moon"), and the four sections are now stored as a historical work at the Technische Universität Dresden library. His maps were completed in 1836, but were not published before his death. In 1878, Johann Schmidt edited and published all 25 sections of the map as Mondkarte in 25 Sektionen. These were republished in 1963. The maps used orthographic projection of the surface as viewed at mean libration.

He was responsible for the founding of the Technische Bildungsanstalt Dresden (Dresden Technical School) on May 1, 1828, and was the first director of that institution. The Lohrmann Observatory is named after him.

Wilhelm's instrument would later be used by Samuel Heinrich Schwabe for his observations of the Sun and sunspots. The asteroid 4680 Lohrmann was named after him, as was the crater Lohrmann on the Moon.
