= Ernst Hartwig =

German astronomer

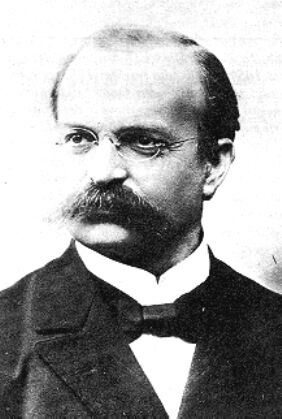
Carl Ernst Albrecht Hartwig

Carl Ernst Albrecht Hartwig (14 January 1851 in Frankfurt – 3 May 1923 in Bamberg) was a German astronomer.

On 20 August 1885, Hartwig discovered a new star, SN 1885A (S Andromedae), in the Andromeda Galaxy, which was the first supernova that was ever seen that was outside the Milky Way. He is also credited for the discovery and co-discovery of three parabolic and hyperbolic comets, namely C/1879 Q2, C/1880 S1 and C/1886 T1. In 1882, Hartwig observed the transit of Venus in Argentina. During the 1883 observation campaign of comet 6P/d'Arrest he found five NGC objects working at the Strasbourg Observatory. In 1874 he became assistant at the Observatory of Strasbourg, 1884 astronomer at Dorpat Observatory and 1887 director of the Remeis Observatory at Bamberg.

The French Academy of Sciences awarded him the Valz Prize in 1902 for his heliometer observations and work on variable stars. Lunar crater Hartwig and Martian crater Hartwig were both named in his honor.
