= Cavalerius (crater) =

Crater on the Moon

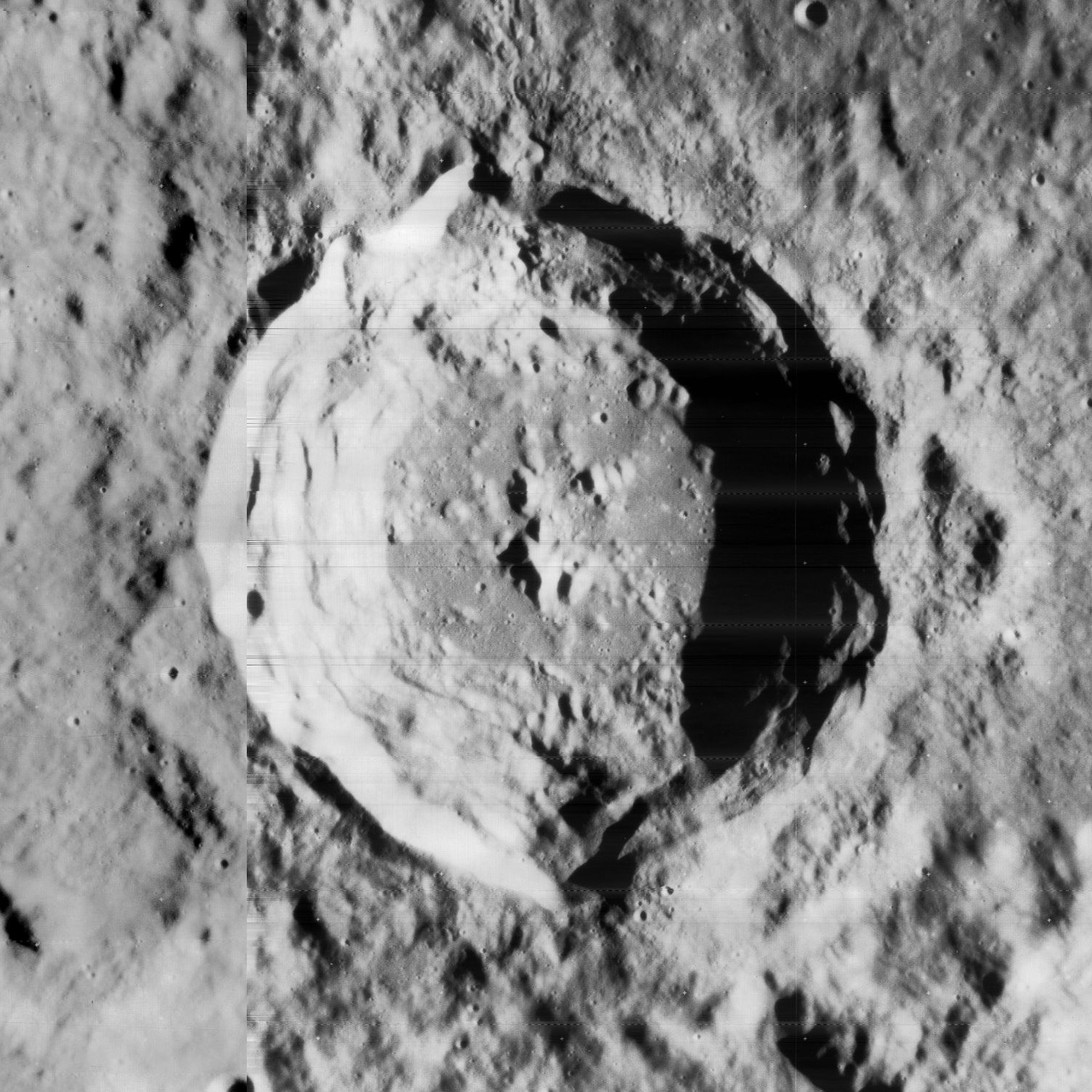
- Mosaic of Lunar Orbiter 4 images
- Coordinates: 5.1°N 66.8°W
- Diameter: 59.35 km (36.88 mi)
- Depth: 3.0 km (1.9 mi)
- Colongitude: 67° at sunrise
- Formation: Eratosthenian
- Eponym: Buonaventura Cavalieri

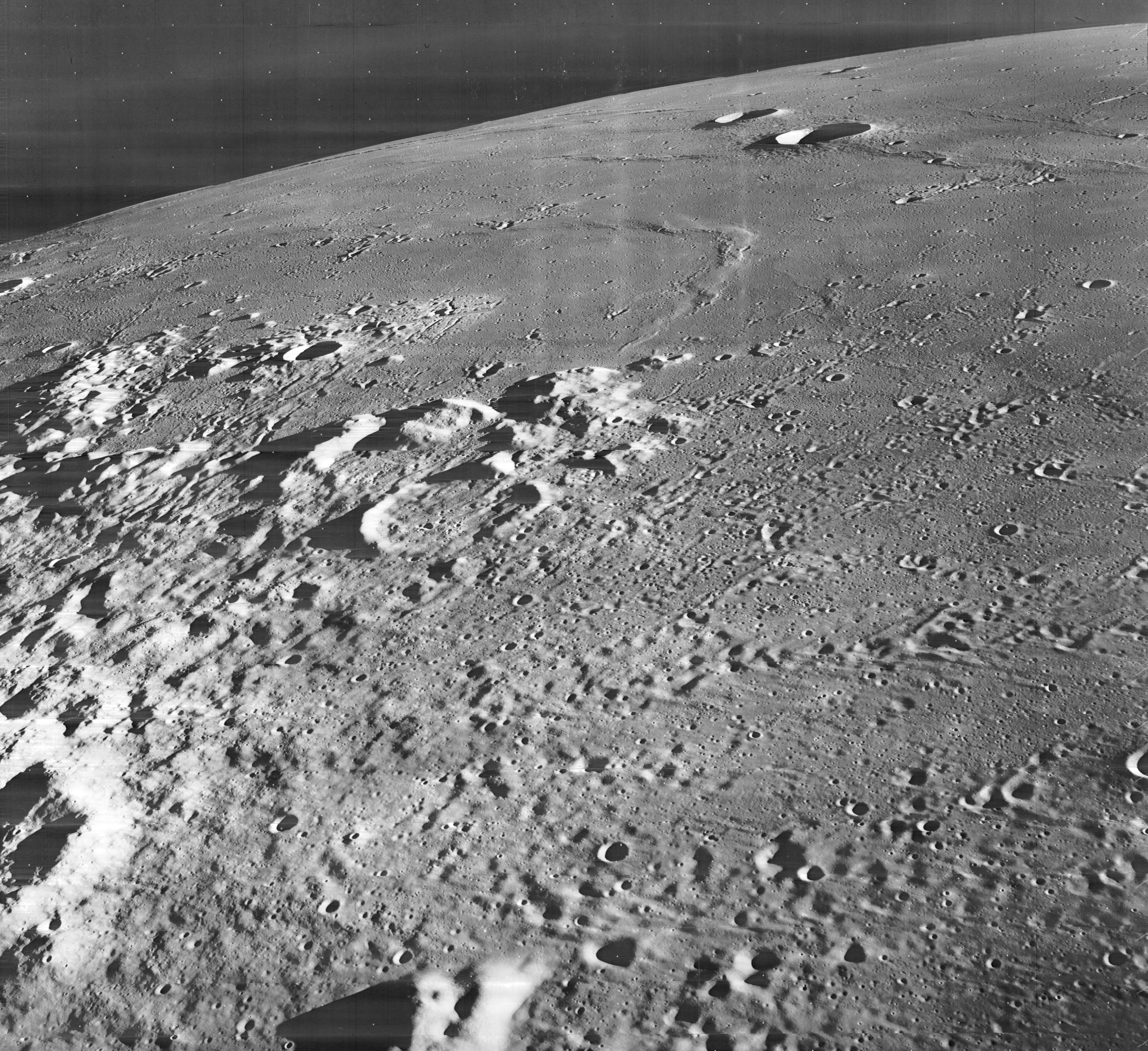
Planitia Descensus, northeast of Cavalerius. Secondary craters of Cavalerius are abundant in the foreground.

Cavalerius is a prominent lunar impact crater that lies on the western edge of the Oceanus Procellarum lunar mare on the west part of the visible Moon. Patrick Moore calls it "a fine object when on the terminator". It nearly joins the northern rim of Hevelius to the south. To the east-northeast is the Reiner Gamma anomaly.

This formation has an estimated age of 3.2±0.2 Ga, which dates it to the Eratosthenian period on the lunar geologic timescale. The rim of Cavalerius is relatively high and sharp, rising to over 3 kilometers in places. There are clefts in the northern and southern parts of the rim and inner walls. Parts of the inner sides are terraced with slumping evident. The interior floor is hummocky in places, with mixed low hills and level areas. In the midpoint of the crater floor is a low central peak, with neighboring ridges to the north and east. The floor of the crater appears rich in clinopyroxene and olivine, while the walls and rim display abundant indications of orthopyroxene.

This crater was named after the Italian mathematician Buonaventura Cavalieri (1598-1647). His name was incorporated into lunar nomenclature by Italian astronomer Giovanni B. Riccioli in 1651. Its designation was officially adopted by the International Astronomical Union in 1935.

Northeast of this crater is the site designated Planitia Descensus, the landing site of the Soviet Luna 9 probe, the first vehicle to soft-land on the Moon. It lies among some low ridges along the edge of the Oceanus Procellarum.

== Satellite craters ==
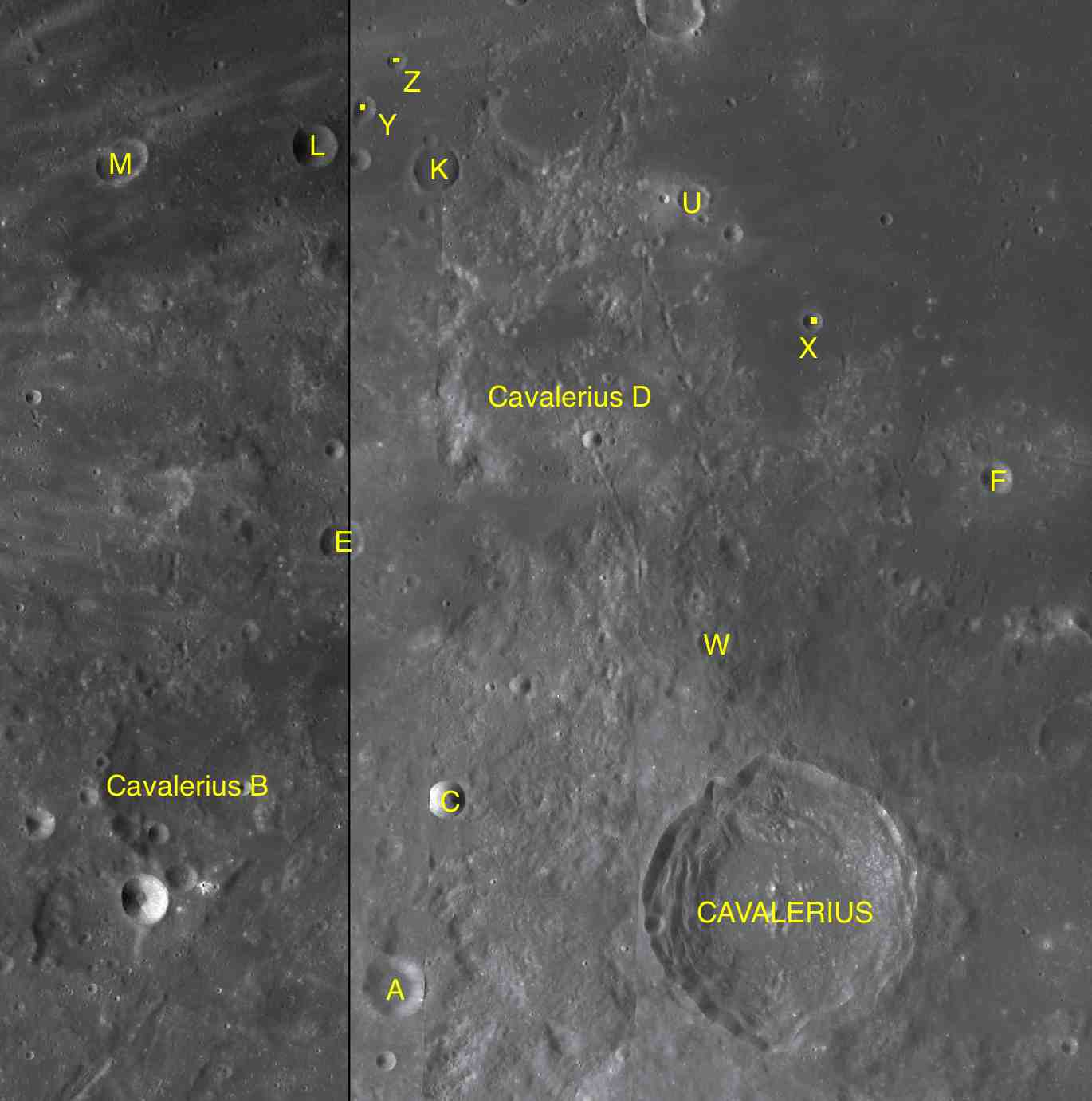
Satellite features of Cavalerius

By convention these features are identified on lunar maps by placing the letter on the side of the crater midpoint that is closest to Cavalerius.

Cavalerius	Latitude	Longitude	Diameter
A	4.5° N	69.5° W	14 km
B	6.0° N	71.0° W	39 km
C	5.8° N	69.2° W	8 km
D	8.6° N	68.3° W	52 km
E	7.7° N	69.9° W	9 km
F	8.1° N	65.3° W	7 km
K	10.3° N	69.2° W	10 km
L	10.4° N	70.2° W	10 km
M	10.3° N	71.5° W	12 km
U	10.1° N	67.4° W	7 km
W	6.9° N	67.3° W	7 km
X	9.2° N	66.6° W	4 km
Y	10.7° N	69.8° W	7 km
Z	11.0° N	69.5° W	4 km

There is a lunar dome near Cavalerius A, "showing evidence of ancient (pre-Orientale) mare volcanism and cryptomare deposits." Cavalerius E is a concentric (double-walled) crater.
