= Bernhard Pattenhausen =

20th-century German geodesist

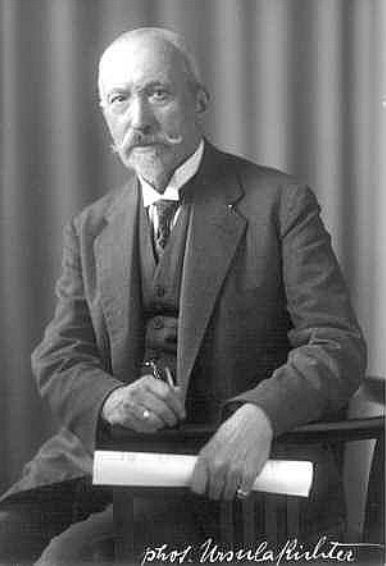
- Bernhard Pattenhausen in 1920
- Born: July 7, 1855; Hamburg, Germany
- Died: August 25, 1926 (aged 71); Darmstadt, Weimar Republic
- Education: Karlsruhe Institute of Technology
- Occupation: geodesist
- Known for: Lohrmann Observatory

Bernhard Nikolaus Philipp Pattenhausen (July 7, 1855 – August 25, 1926) was a German geodesist. He co-founded the Lohrmann Observatory in Dresden in 1913.

== Early life ==
Pattenhausen was born in Darmstadt, Germany in 1855, the twelfth child of a family of merchants. He studied engineering at the Karlsruhe Institute of Technology from 1872 to 1876.

== Career ==
After graduating from KIT, Pattenhausen worked for two years as an assistant to Wilhelm Jordan. He received a post-doctoral habilitation in 1889 which enabled him to teach independently at a university. He also worked at the Ducal Forestry Institute in Braunschweig for several years before being appointed director in 1893. That year, he was made professor of mathematics and geodesy at the Dresden University of Technology, becoming rector in 1907 or 1908.

Pattenhausen was director of the Mathematical and Physical Salon in[Dresden after 1894. He was appointed chairman of the Society for Geography in Dresden from 1904 to 1919, and became a Privy Councillor in 1906. He co-founded the Lohrmann Observatory at TU Dresden in 1913.

He was awarded an honorary doctorate from the Braunschweig University of Technology in 1926. He died of a stroke in 1926 and was burined in the Tolkweitz cemetery of Dresden.
