= Lohrmann Observatory =

Astronomical observatory in Dresden, Germany

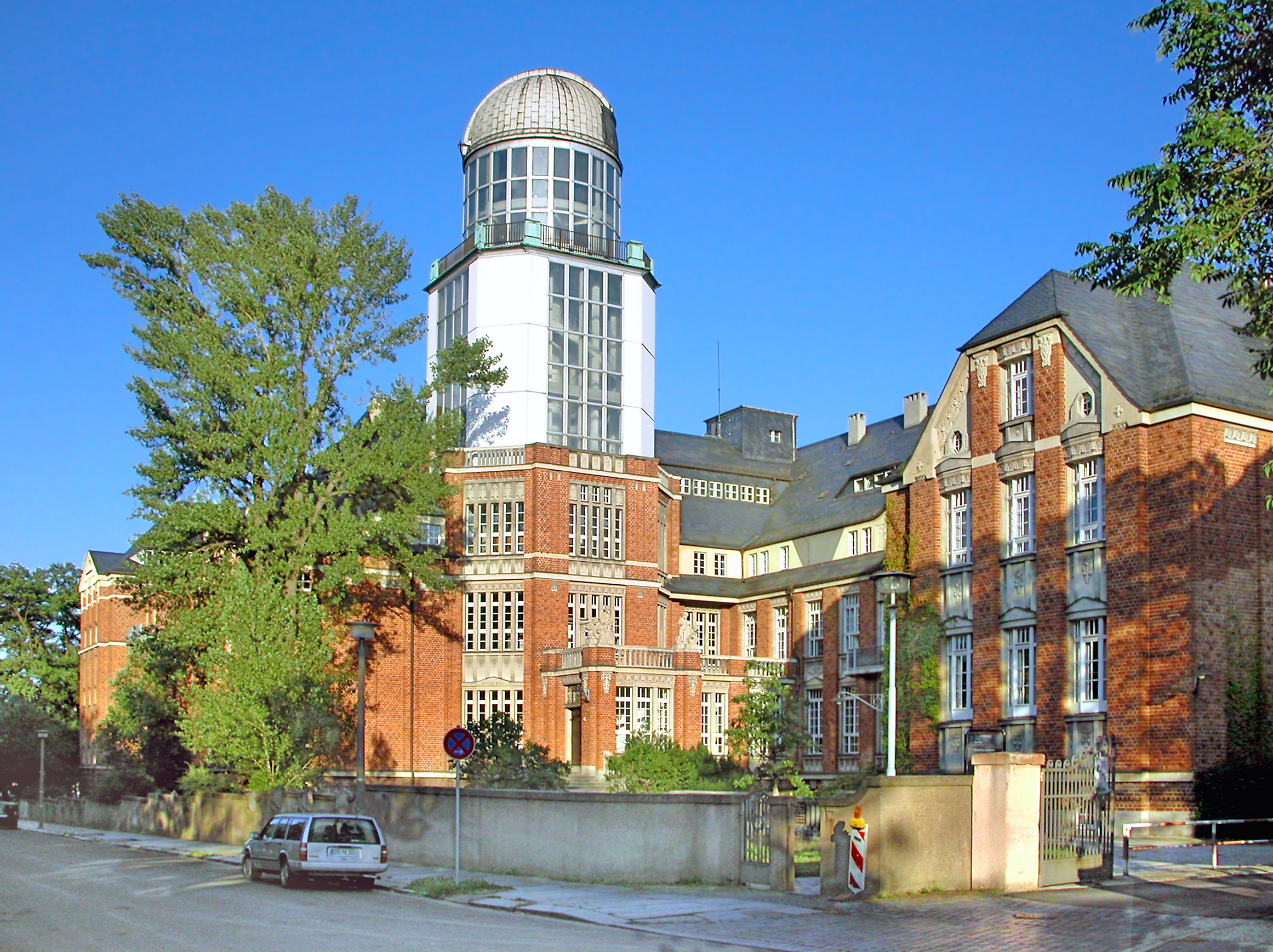
- Lohrmann Observatory in the Beyer Building
- Organization: Dresden University of Technology
- Observatory code: 040
- Location: Dresden, Germany
- Coordinates: 51.029871°N 13.729123°E
- Altitude: 140 metres (460 ft)
- Established: 1913
- Website: tu-dresden.de/bu/umwelt/geo/ipg/astro

The Lohrmann Observatory is an astronomical observatory at the Dresden University of Technology in Dresden, Germany. Founded by Bernhard Pattenhausen in 1913, it is housed in the upper tower of the Beyer Building on the southern border of the TU Dresden campus, one of the earliest high-rise buildings in Germany. The observatory is named after the Dresden astronomer and cartographer Wilhelm Gotthelf Lohrmann, who produced some of the most detailed maps of the Moon in the 19th century.

The observatory's research has focused on geodetic astronomy, celestial mechanics, and astrometry. Its main instrument is a 30 cm Heyde refracting telescope with a 500 cm focal length, the largest telescope in Saxony. The observatory also houses a 24-seat planetarium and a collection of historical astronomical-geodetic instruments. A field observatory was operated at Triebenberg, the highest point in Dresden, from 2007 until its closure in 2017.

The observatory is assigned code 040 by the International Astronomical Union.

== History ==
The observatory was founded by Bernhard Pattenhausen (1855–1926), a professor at TU Dresden and director of the Geodetic Institute, and began construction in 1910. Completed in 1913, it formed part of the Beyer Building, dubbed the Beyerbau, on the southern border of the TU Dresden campus. The dome was built atop a 10-floor tower 40 meters above street level and was one of "the first high-rise buildings in Germany." In 1915, a refracting telescope was commissioned under the dome primarily for demonstration purposes.

During World War II, the refractor was disassembled and temporarily relocated at the Leipzig Observatory in Austria. The Beyerbau building and dome suffered heavy damage on February 13, 1945, during the Bombing of Dresden. Reconstruction was carried out in 1951, and a refurbished refractor telescope was added in 1957.

The observatory became part of the Lohrmann Institute for Geodetic Astronomy, established in 1961, until its dissolution in 1968. The Chair of Astronomy at TU Dresden is ex officio the director of the observatory.

Research at the observatory focused on geodetic astronomy, celestial mechanics and astrometry. Observations of minor planets were conducted between 1959 and 1974, and of star occultations by the moon between 1960 and 1996. The glass dome was remodeled with thermally insulated glass in the 1980s, and the guidance system for the refractor was improved in 1994.

The observatory is assigned the observatory code 040 by the International Astronomical Union (IAU).

=== Triebenberg Field Observatory ===
Due to unfavorable observation conditions from light pollution in the urban environment of Dresden, a branch office was opened in Gönnsdorf, a district in east Dresden, in the 1960s. An astrographwas commissioned there in 1975.

In 2007, a new observatory was built on the Triebenberg, the highest point in Dresden. It was assigned observatory code C01 by the IAU after becoming operational. Its main instrument was an automatic 60 cm Newtonian telescope with a Peltier-cooled 16-megapixel charge-coupled device (CCD). The telescope was connected to a camera, so visual observations were reserved for the Lohrmann Observatory telescope. The Triebenberg Observatory was mainly used to determine the position of asteroids and transit photometry of exoplanets.

The Triebenberg branch and its field observatory were closed in 2017.

=== Wilhelm Gotthelf Lohrmann ===
Lohrmann was born January 31, 1796, the son of Dresden's official brick manufacturer (Ratsziegelmeister). He began to show interest in geodesy at age 9, and later studied architecture at the Dresden Academy of Fine Arts. Lohrmann was a lifelong member of the Royal Saxon Chamber Surveying Institute, becoming director in 1818. He conducted scientific research as an amateur astronomer and met Johann Franz Encke in Gotha and Joseph von Fraunhofer in Munich.

Between 1822 and 1836, Lohrmann worked to map the moon's surface. He used a telescope and cartographic projections to map selenography coordinates and measure lunar libration. In 1828, he began systematic meteorological observations. That year, he became co-founder and head of the Technical Education Institute, the forerunner to TU Dresden.

He was elected to the city parliament in 1830, working to develop the railway system of the Kingdom of Saxony in 1833. He became director of the state Surveying Institute in 1840.

Lohrmann died on February 20, 1840, of typhoid fever. He is buried at the Eliasfriedhof cemetery in Dresden.

== Architecture ==
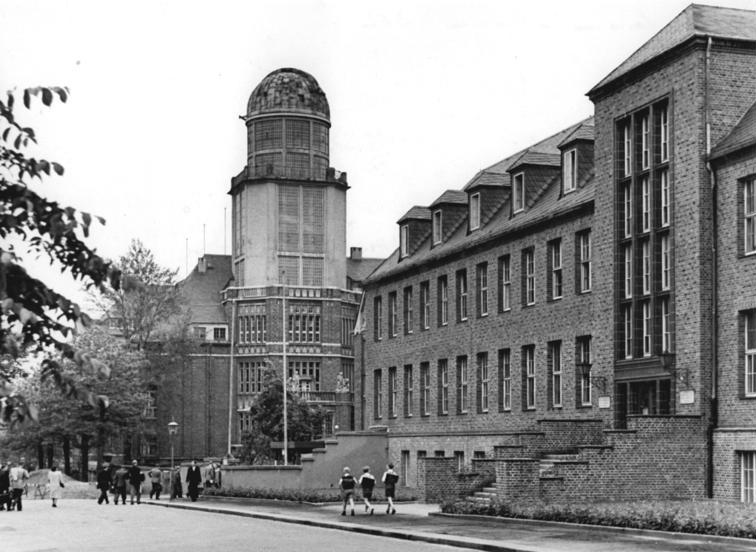
Lohrmann Observatory in 1953

The observatory was planned and erected by architect Martin Dülfer, who was part of the Dresden reform movement. He took stylistic inspiration from northern German building traditions, including red brick, hipped roofs, flat bay windows, and narrow pillars. He also incorporated Art Nouveau elements.

As one of the earliest high-rise buildings in Germany, Dülfer emulated the Bau 15 in Jena and the Narva Tower in Friedrichshain. He chose an octagonal base for the staggered tower, a feature typical of observatories since the Tower of the Winds in the Roman Agora. The tower was constructed with a glass roundabout for the dome, including high windows with alternating pilasters to achieve an impression of verticality and monumentality. Bombing during the war destroyed the wooden roof truss and tower cladding. The restored version preserved the original form of the tower.

== Instruments ==
The main instrument is a 30 cm Heyde refractor with a 500 cm focal length. It is the largest telescope in Saxony. The telescope is primarily used for visual observations of the moon, planets, Orion Nebula, and Andromeda Galaxy. It is equipped with a secondary guide telescope and astronomical camera.

The observatory also has two Schmidt–Cassegrain telescopes. The first has a 25 cm aperture diameter and 250 cm focal length and comes equipped with a CCD camera, primarily used by students. The second has a 20 cm aperture and 200 cm focal length. It features automatic initialization, battery operation, and an additional solar telescope for observations of the sun's primary Hydrogen-alpha emission line.

There is also a 6 cm aperture and 84 cm focal length telescope primarily used for training and public observation of astronomical events such as the transit of Venus in 2004.

The observatory tower has a 24-seat planetarium equipped with a Zeiss ZKP1. It also houses a collection of historical astronomical-geodetic instruments.

== Directors ==
- Bernhard Pattenhausen (1913–1925)
- Hans-Ulrich Sandig (1956–1975)
- Klaus-Günter Steinert (1975–1995)
- Michael Soffel (1995–2019)
- Sergei A. Klioner (2019-Present)

== See also ==
- List of observatory codes
