= C/1862 N1 (Schmidt) =

Hyperbolic comet

Discovery
- Discovered by: Johann Schmidt; Wilhelm Tempel
- Discovery site: Athens Observatory
- Discovery date: 2 July 1862

Designations
- Alternative designations: Comet Schmidt–Tempel; 1862 II

Orbital characteristics
- Epoch: 4 July 1862 (JD 2401325.5)
- Observation arc: 29 days
- Number of observations: 72
- Aphelion: ~1,935 AU (inbound)
- Perihelion: 0.981 AU
- Semi-major axis: ~968 AU (inbound)
- Eccentricity: 0.99898 (inbound); 1.00002 (outbound)
- Orbital period: ~30,100 years (inbound)
- Inclination: 172.11°
- Longitude of ascending node: 328.44°
- Argument of periapsis: 27.166°
- Mean anomaly: 359.25°
- Last perihelion: 22 June 1862

Physical characteristics
- Comet total magnitude (M1): 9.4
- Apparent magnitude: 4–5 (1862 apparition)

C/1862 N1 (Schmidt), sometimes referred to as C/1862 N1 (Schmidt–Tempel), is a non-periodic comet discovered by Johann Friedrich Julius Schmidt on 2 July 1862.

== Observational history ==
The comet was discovered on 2 July 1862 Johann Friedrich Julius Schmidt, then director of the National Observatory of Athens, and a few hours later was discovered by Wilhelm Tempel, at Marseille Observatory. The comet upon discovery was located in the constellation Cassiopeia and Schmidt described the comet as being tailless, with a coma 22 arcminutes across, and visible with the naked eye. Temple estimated its magnitude to be 4–5. Schmidt observed the comet again on July 4 and noted a tail half a degree long.

The comet passed at a distance of 0.0982 AU (14.69 million km) from Earth on 4 July, making it the fourth closest known approach of a comet to Earth in the 19th century. Consequently the comet moved away from both the Earth and the Sun, while brightening moonlight hampered observations. The comet was last observed with the naked eye on 7 July. The comet faded rapidly throughout the month and it was last observed on 31 July.

== Meteors ==
The comet has been tentatively associated with the weak meteor shower ζ Arietids, observed between 13 and 25 August. The minimum orbital intersection distance between the comet and Earth is 0.028 AU.
