= Hartwig (lunar crater) =

Lunar impact crater

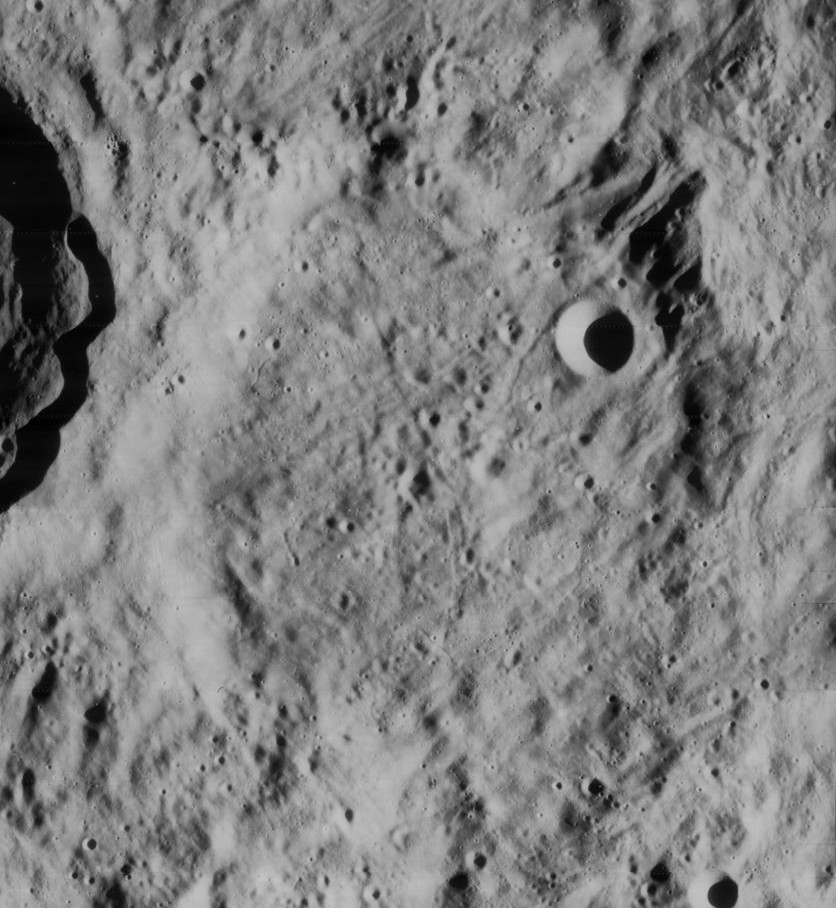
- Lunar Orbiter 4 image
- Coordinates: 6.1°S 80.5°W
- Diameter: 80 km
- Depth: Unknown
- Colongitude: 81° at sunrise
- Eponym: Karl E. Hartwig

Hartwig is a lunar impact crater that is located near the western limb of the Moon. It is attached to the eastern rim of the prominent crater Schlüter, to the northeast of the Montes Cordillera mountain range that surrounds the Mare Orientale. To the east-northeast of Hartwig is the larger crater Riccioli.

This crater lies within the outer blanket of ejecta that surrounds the Mare Orientale impact basin, and its form has been modified by this material. Much of the eastern rim of the crater is overlaid by this ejecta, and only a portion of the western rim near Schluter remains well-formed. The interior floor has likewise been modified. There is a small crater on the floor near the northeastern rim. Hartwig is associated with a magnetic anomaly.

This crater is named after German astronomer Karl E. Hartwig (1851–1923), a specialist in lunar rotation theory.

== Satellite craters ==
By convention these features are identified on lunar maps by placing the letter on the side of the crater midpoint that is closest to Hartwig.

Hartwig	Latitude	Longitude	Diameter
A	5.7° S	79.8° W	10 km
B	8.3° S	77.4° W	11 km
