= Q Cygni =

1876 Nova in the constellation Cygnus

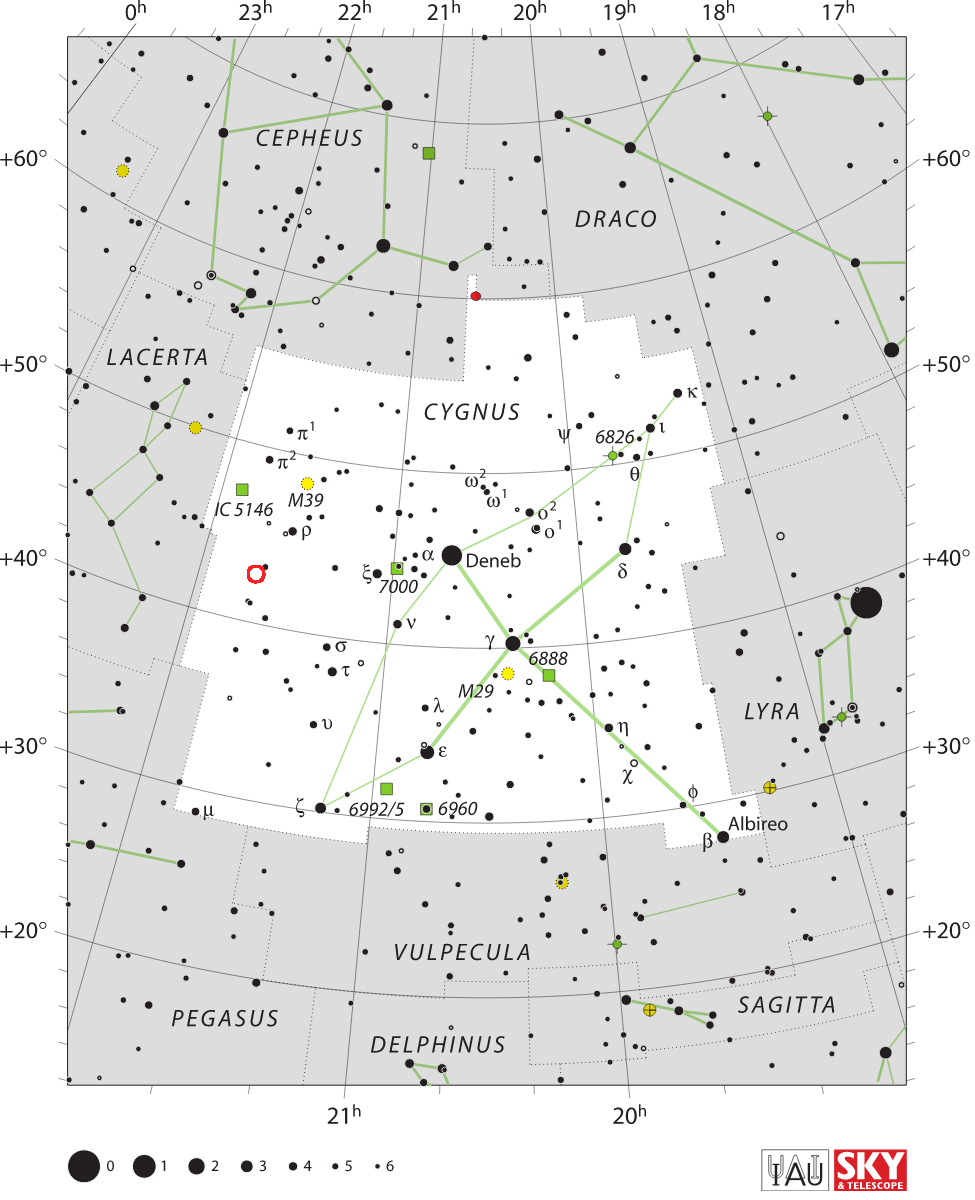
- Location of Q Cygni (circled in red)

Observation data Epoch J2000 Equinox ICRS
- Constellation: Cygnus
- Right ascension: 21^{h} 41^{m} 43.928^{s}
- Declination: +42° 50′ 29.04″
- Apparent magnitude (V): 3.0 - 15.6

Characteristics
- Spectral type: K5
- Variable type: Nova

Astrometry
Parallax (π)	0.729±0.024 mas
Distance	1372+51 −42 (741 - 3,300) pc
Absolute magnitude (M_{V})	−9.1 - +2.9

Details

White dwarf
Mass	0.8 M_{☉}
Surface gravity (log g)	8.5 cgs
Temperature	31,000 K

secondary
Mass	0.6 M_{☉}

Other designations
- Nova Cygni 1876, HR 8296, BD+42°4182a, AAVSO 2137+42, 2MASS J21414393+4250290, Gaia DR2 1966874711229398656

Database references
SIMBAD	data

Q Cygni (Q Cyg), is a star located in the constellation Cygnus. It is also known as Nova Cygni 1876, and has the designation NGC 7114, and HR 8296. Nova Cygni is located in the northwestern portion of Cygnus along the border with Lacerta.

One of the earliest novae recorded, Q Cygni was discovered by astronomer Johann Friedrich Julius Schmidt on November 24, 1876. The star had undergone a nova, brightening to about 3rd magnitude and remaining as bright for four days.

The system is termed a cataclysmic variable, composed of a white dwarf in close orbit with another star that orbit each other every 10 hours. The white dwarf is surrounded by an accretion disc, which blazes much brighter than the star it circles. The system has been estimated to be 740 ± 11 parsecs distant. The secondary star has been estimated to be around 0.6 times as massive as the Sun, making it an orange dwarf of spectral type K5. Also known as a donor star, the secondary supplies mass to the white dwarf via its accretion disc.

A small nebulous disc was reported around the nova and this led to it being listed in the New General Catalogue as a possible planetary nebula. No nebulosity is visible in modern observations and the Revised New General Catalogue lists this as a "non-existent" object.

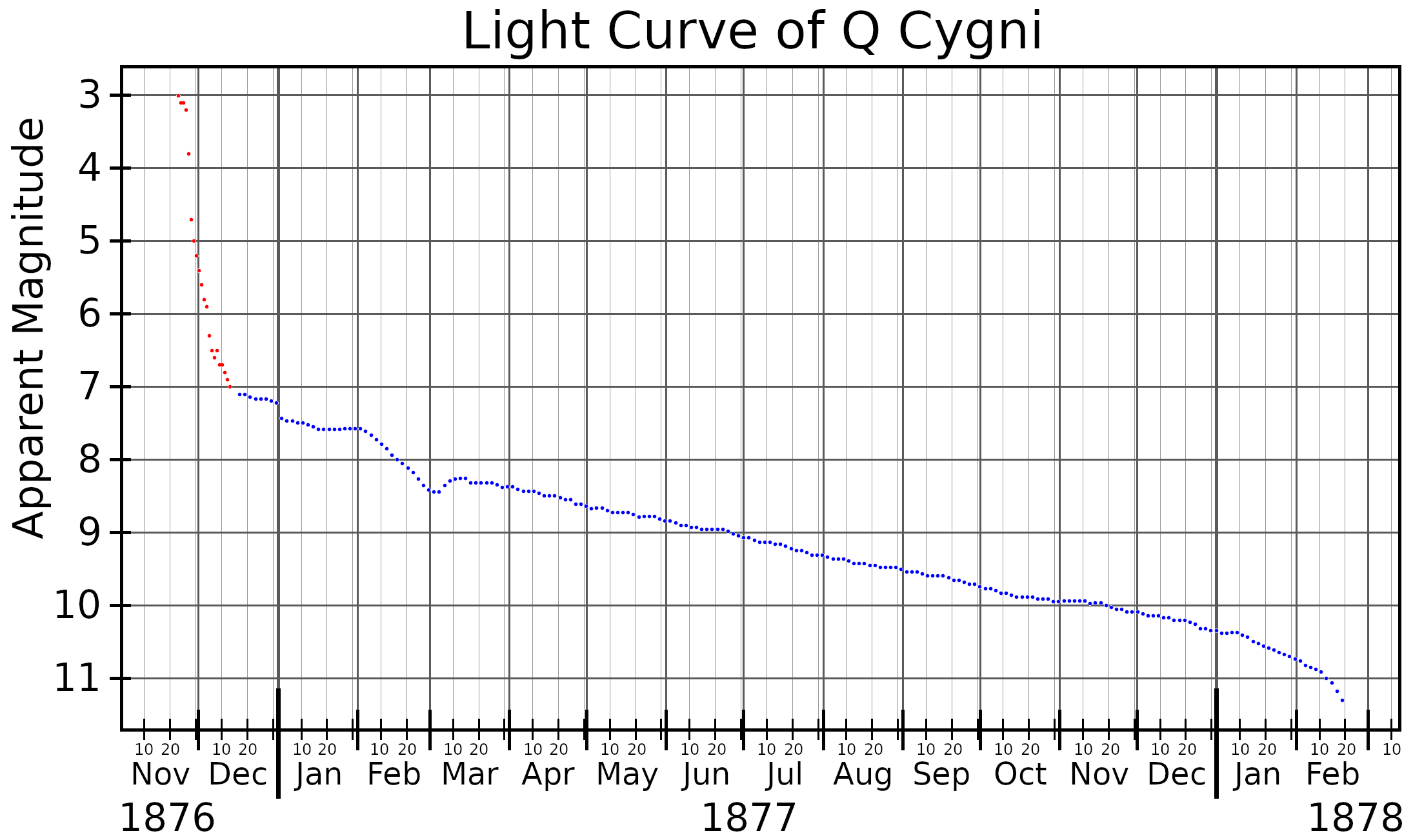
The light curve of Q Cygni. The red points are from a table published by Schmidt, and the blue points were measured from a plot published by Lockyer.
