= Johann Friedrich Julius Schmidt =

German astronomer and geophysicist

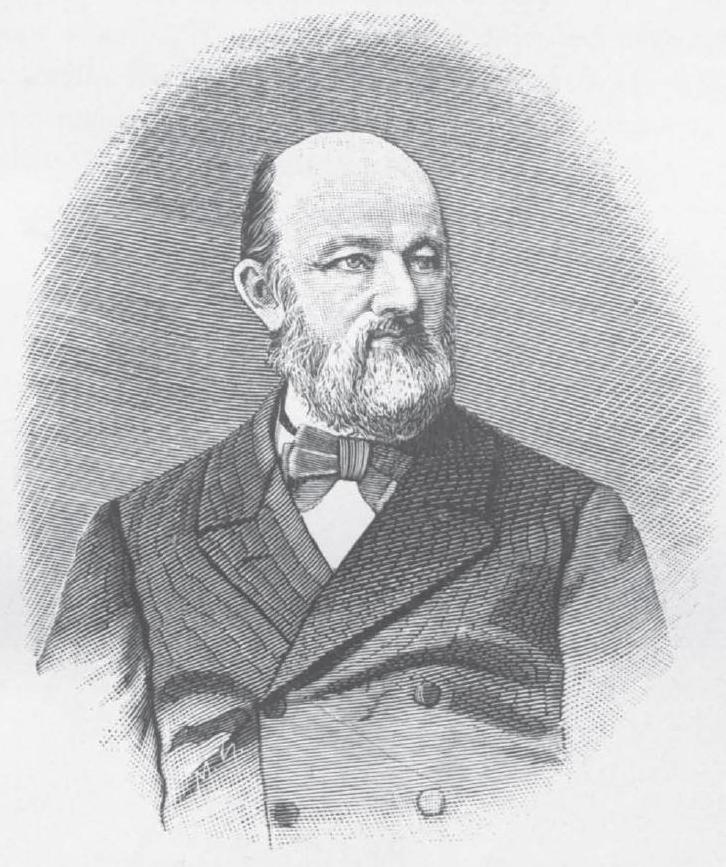
- Born: October 25, 1825; Eutin, Grand Duchy of Oldenburg (now Germany)
- Died: February 7, 1884 (aged 58); Athens, Greece
- Occupations: Astronomer; Geophysicist; Selenographer
- Parents: Carl Friedrich Schmidt; Maria Elisabeth Quirling

Johann Friedrich Julius Schmidt (25 October 1825 in Eutin, Grand Duchy of Oldenburg – 7 February 1884 in Athens, Greece) was a German astronomer and geophysicist. He was the director of the National Observatory of Athens in Greece from 1858 to 1884. Julius Schmidt was tireless in his work, it was suggested by William Henry Pickering that he perhaps devoted more of his life than any other man to the study of the Moon. During his lifetime, he made some of the most complete lunar maps of the 19th century.

According to his own analysis, he mapped no less than 32,856 craters, with Mädler mapping 7,735 and Lohrmann 7,177. Schmidt also mapped 348 lunar rilles. In six years, he made almost 57,000 micrometer settings to make 3050 height measurements of the terrain.

== Biography ==
=== Early life ===
Schmidt was born in the town of Eutin to his father Carl Friedrich Schmidt, a glazier and his mother Maria Elisabeth Quirling. He went to school at a gymnasium in Hamburg, where he impressed with his sense of form and drawing abilities and demonstrated a strong interest in science. In the autumn of 1839, during an auction in his hometown, he stumbled upon a copy of Schröter's book, Selenotopographische Fragmente. As Schmidt himself put it,

“The sight of numerous illustrations of shadow-casting mountains and craters made such a strong and lasting impression that it determined the main direction of my later life.”

Prior to this, 14-year-old Schmidt had been interested in botany and zoology for a while. He could not make the decision to switch careers until he could see for himself what a sight the Moon would grant when viewed through a telescope. That wish was fulfilled when his father made him a "small, very good" telescope which Schmidt used to look at the Moon. Leaning against a lamppost, he recognized the rays of Tycho and immediately made his first attempt at drawing the crater and ray system. This telescope could only magnify 10x, however, the objective was ground according to "Dollond's principle", meaning it was achromatic.

Reading Schröter's work and drawing the Moon became his main occupation, and it was not long until Schmidt devised a tripod for the telescope, which could go in both up-down and left-right motions. Although the execution was rough, the wooden mount made it much easier for him to continue lunar observations. Now he started drawing entire phases, not considering the libration but paying attention to the shadows. Thus passed by 1840, with Schmidt's habits making him neglect school.

In the spring of 1841, Hellwag, a government councilor who was well experienced in astronomy, noticed his efforts. Hellwag asked Hofrath Voss, the son of the well known Eutin school rector, to entrust Schmidt with a 1200mm focal length Dollond telescope which Schmidt found to be very sharp, approximating the magnification to be 15-20x. He saw the bands of Jupiter, Saturn's rings and a crescent Venus for the first time with it.

In July 1841, the Hamburg Gymnasium made a visit to the Altona Observatory, where Schmidt looked through a larger telescope for the first time and became acquainted with the well-known map of the Moon made by Wilhelm Beer and Johann Heinrich Mädler. Dr. Petersen showed him the craters Gassendi and Bullialdus.

Rümker taught him the fundamentals of astronomical observation and let him use various telescopes from 1842 to 1845. In 1843, he made his first contribution to Astronomische Nachrichten, about the Sun and variable stars, with many more to follow.

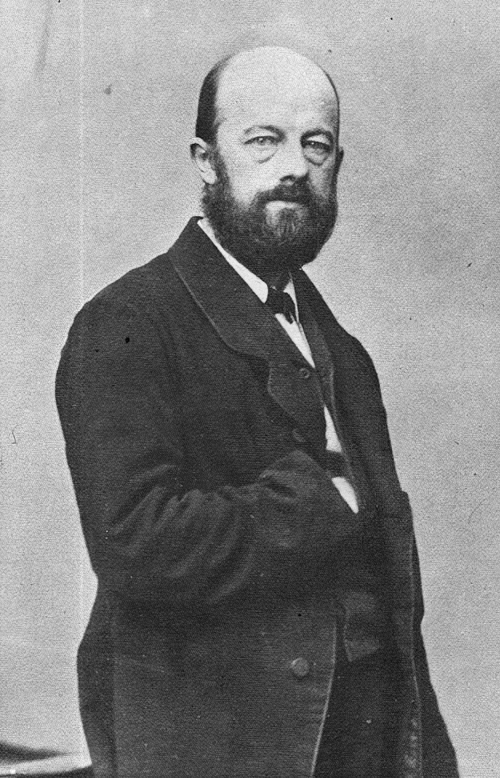
A photo of Julius Schmidt

=== Benzenberg's assistant ===
In 1845, he obtained a position as an assistant at Johann Friedrich Benzenberg's private observatory in Bilk near Düsseldorf, being tasked to with naked eye objects such as meteors, and searching for possible objects closer to the Sun than Mercury. However, the telescope made available to him was practically a low power terrestrial telescope, and the larger instrument was kept under a lock and key, as to prevent 20 year old Schmidt from damaging its "outer looks and splendor".

Here, he confined himself to drawing parts of the lunar landscape instead of the entire face, using the method of drawing the same area under different lighting conditions or sun angles, the same one Schröter used. The drawing of entire phases was stopped from this point forward.

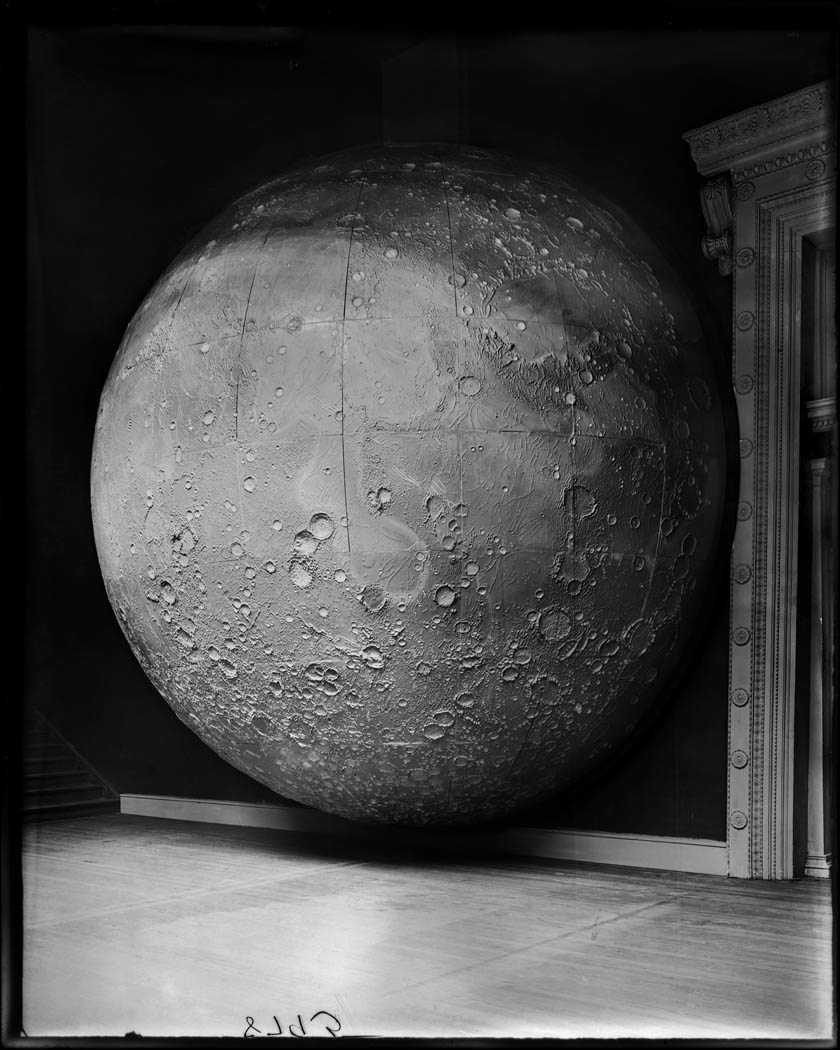
Field Columbian Museum Moon Model, made by Julius Schmidt and Thomas Dickert in 1854

=== Years 1846 – 1858 ===
A year later, after Benzenberg died, he joined the Bonn Observatory under Friedrich Wilhelm Argelander. Here, Schmidt measured the visual magnitudes and positions for Hora V of the Berlin Academy of Sciences star chart and catalogue project. He was not able to continue observing the Moon due to his job, but he still obtained numerous valuable drawings, and when he did not, what was seen was preserved in writing. He left Bonn in May of 1853 due to ill health. He received an honorary doctorate from Bonn in 1868.

From 1853 to 1858 he was director of Baron von Unkrechtsberg's private observatory at Olmütz (today Olomouc, Czech Republic), where he made only a few drawings, but undertook micrometric measurements of its mountains to further increase the knowledge of the Moon.

=== Work at Athens Observatory ===
In 1858, Simon Sinas made a proposal for Schmidt to come to Athens and become the director of the Athens Observatory (now known as National Observatory of Athens). Accepting the offer would bring him a good salary, freedom to do the research he wants to do and a site with a large amount of clear nights per year. The decision was his, as Schmidt never married, so on December 2, he chose to accept the offer. The degraded state of the observatory forbid observation. It was not until November 1859 that it was in a usable state, after a year of repairs requested by Schmidt, though the restoration was entirely completed in 1861.

The observatory's instruments at the time included:

- a 158mm aperture f/15 achromatic refracting telescope restored by Plössl
- a 94mm aperture meridian circle
- five small telescopes for comets
- two chronometers; one for mean time and another for sidereal time
- two barometers
- other meteorological instruments

When the air was stable enough, he drew while using an eyepiece that provides 300x magnification in combination with the large observatory telescope. Only in very rare cases could he use an eyepiece of 500x magnification. He ran systematic studies on not only the Moon but also sunspots, color of stars, variable stars, meteors, comets, Saturn's rings, eclipses, twilight, zodiacal light, nebulas, weather, seismic activity, rotational period and diameters of the major planets and satellites of the gas giants.

In 1862 he discovered the comet C/1862 N1 (Schmidt), which was named after him.

On 19 January 1865, while he was inspecting the Cape catalogue nebulae with a 6 ft refractor he discovered five galaxies: NGC 1381, NGC 1382, NGC 1386, NGC 1389 and NGC 1428, all of which are members of the Fornax Cluster. Their discovery was published ten years later in 1876 with the work Über einige im Cape-Catalog fehlende Nebel.

In 1866 he made the astonishing claim that Linné crater had considerably changed its appearance, which began a controversy that continued for many decades. Coming from such a careful lifelong observer, the claim carried some weight; however, the claim is generally considered unproven. Schmidt may have been biased by his volcano observations taken place during the same year.

He spent over two years on the first draft of his great Moon map encompassing the entirety of the lunar surface, gradually entering the results of his more recent observations from Athens, when he realized continuing this undertaking would not end well. The dimensions of the initial four quadrants were too large to capture the detail he hoped for with the necessary precision. Even disregarding this, having such large plates engraved in copper would have been very difficult to execute. He had to accept these facts and discarded the work in April 1867. He chose Lohrmann's divisions for the second attempt, using 25 sections to cover the entirety of the Moon.

Charte der Gebirge des Mondes, as it is known, was finished in 1874. Julius Schmidt presented the chart at the Berlin Observatory in December of that year. This was the first map of the Moon to surpass the celebrated Mappa Selenographica of Beer and Mädler.

On 24 November 1876, he discovered Nova Cygni, also known as Q Cygni.

In 1878, Schmidt also edited and published all 25 sections of a moon map by Wilhelm Gotthelf Lohrmann. Lohrmann had completed his map in 1836 but had died in 1840; only the first four sections of the map had been published in 1824. Schmidt was awarded the Valz Prize from the French Academy of Sciences in recognition of this selenographic work.

=== Death ===
Due to age and distance between his home and the observatory, he stopped regularly working there from 1871 onwards. He asked the Berlin Academy of Sciences to provide him with a small telescope on an equatorial mount, so he could continue astronomical observations from his house. Schmidt's wish was granted.

He died unexpectedly on February 7, 1884, due to heart problems. Just the day before, he had been attending a social event at the German Embassy. When he passed, the King and Queen of Greece, professors, students and thousands of Greek citizens attended the funeral oration at his observatory. Julius Schmidt was buried in the First Cemetery of Athens. He was only 58 years old.

== Legacy ==
The crater Schmidt on the Moon is jointly named for him and two other people of the same last name. Schmidt crater on Mars is named for him and Otto Schmidt.

== Works ==
=== Major written works ===
Books authored by Julius Schmidt
Date	Title	Title in English
1852	Beobachtungen über Sternschnuppen	Shooting Star Observations
1856	Höhen-Bestimmungen am Vesuv	Altitude Determinations at Vesuvius
1856	Die Eruption des Vesuv	The Eruption of Vesuvius
1856	Das Zodiakallicht	The Zodiacal Light
1856	Der Mond	The Moon
1857	Beobachtungen der Sonnenflecken	Sunspot Observations
1858	Leistungen der Bourdon'schen Metallbarometer	Performance of Bourdon's Metal Barometers
1866	Rillen auf dem Monde	Rilles on the Moon
1869	Physikalische Geographie von Griechenland	Physical Geography of Greece
1874	Vulkanstudien	Volcano Studies
1875	Studien über Erdbehen	Studies on Earthquakes
1878	Charte der Gebirge des Mondes	Chart of the Mountains of the Moon

=== Charte der Gebirge des Mondes ===
The complete title is Charte der Gebirge des Mondes nach eigenen Beobachtungen in den Jahren 1840-1874, which translates to "Chart of the Mountains of the Moon based on my own Observations in the Years 1840-1874". The chart is split into 25 sections based on Lohrmann's divisions. The relief is portrayed using hachure shading, with lines indicating slope. Schmidt makes no attempt to portray color, but uses darker shades for the mare regions. The wrinkle ridges have exaggerated slopes.

Its sister book of the same name includes Schmidt's biography, an in-depth explanation of the charts, his observations and decisions, and list of micrometer measurements, height measurements and descriptions of thousands of features.

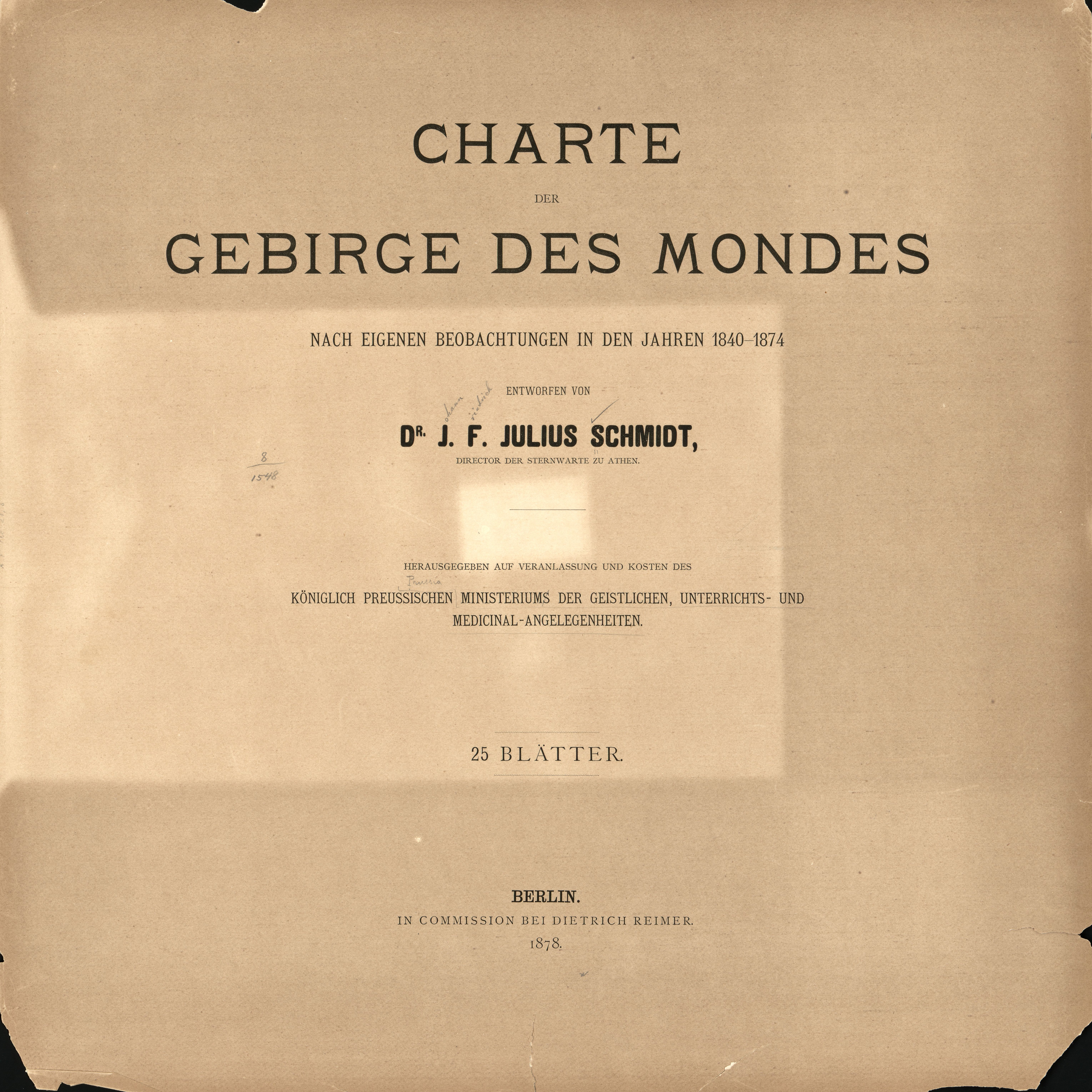
Title page of the chart

== Bibliography ==
- Theodossiou, E.Th.; Manimanis, V.N.; Mantarakis, P. (2007). "Demetrios Eginitis Restorer of the Athens Observatory" (PDF). Journal of Astronomical History and Heritage. 10 (2): 123. Bibcode:2007JAHH...10..123T. doi:10.3724/SP.J.1440-2807.2007.02.05. ISSN 1440-2807. S2CID 129260817.
- Harvey, Stephen; Matsopoulos, Nicolas (2020). The Moon A Translation of Der Mond by Johann Friedrich Julius Schmidt. Horsham, United Kingdom: Springer. ISBN 978-3-030-37269-9.
