= Francesco Maria Grimaldi =

Italian priest and mathematician

The Reverend Francesco Maria Grimaldi SJ
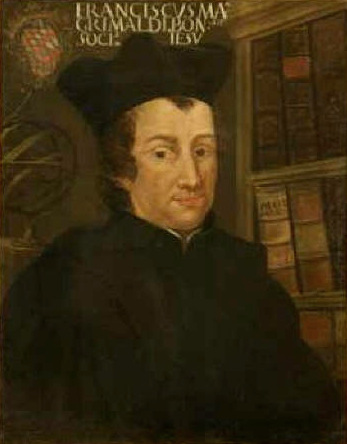
- Born: 2 April 1618; Bologna
- Died: 28 August 1663 (aged 45); Bologna
- Other names: Francisco Maria Grimaldo; Franciscus Grimaldi
- Known for: Free fall, diffraction
- Scientific career
- Fields: Mathematics, Physics

Francesco Maria Grimaldi SJ (2 April 1618 – 28 December 1663) was an Italian Jesuit priest, mathematician and physicist who taught at the Jesuit college in Bologna. He was born in Bologna to Paride Grimaldi and Anna Cattani.

== Work ==
Between 1640 and 1650, working with Riccioli, he investigated the free fall of objects, confirming that the distance of fall was proportional to the square of the time taken. Grimaldi and Riccioli also made a calculation of gravity at the Earth's surface by recording the oscillations of an accurate pendulum.

In astronomy, he built and used instruments to measure lunar mountains as well as the height of clouds, and drew an accurate map or, selenograph, which was published by Riccioli and now adorns the entrance to the National Air and Space Museum in Washington D.C.

He discovered and was the first to make accurate observations on the diffraction of light and coined the word 'diffraction'. In his book Physico-Mathesis de Lumine, Coloribus et Iride (1665), he stated the theory of the reconstitution of sunlight from refracted coloured light. (There is a far-fetched account that Leonardo da Vinci had earlier noted the effect.)

Through experimentation he was able to demonstrate that the observed passage of light could not be reconciled with the idea that it moved in a rectilinear path. Rather, the light that passed through the hole took on the shape of a cone. Later physicists used his work as evidence that light was a wave, significantly, Dutch mathematician Christiaan Huygens. He also discovered what are known as diffraction bands.

The crater Grimaldi on the Moon is named after him.

The asteroid129743 Grimaldi is named after him.

== Publications ==
He only published one work:

- Physico-mathesis de lumine, coloribus et iride aliisque adnexis (in Latin). Girolamo Bernia: Johann Zieger. 1665.

The work is mainly remembered for being the first report of diffraction. In the work, he was mainly concerned with two questions:

1. Is light a substance or an accident [roughly the same as "property"]?
2. What is the relation between light and color?

He argued that light is probably a subtle fluid (thus a substance), though it might still be an accident (as Aristotelians believed). He also argued that color is associated with undulations of the subtle fluid.

== See also ==
- List of Jesuit scientists
- List of Roman Catholic scientist-clerics
