= Grimaldi (crater) =

Crater on the Moon

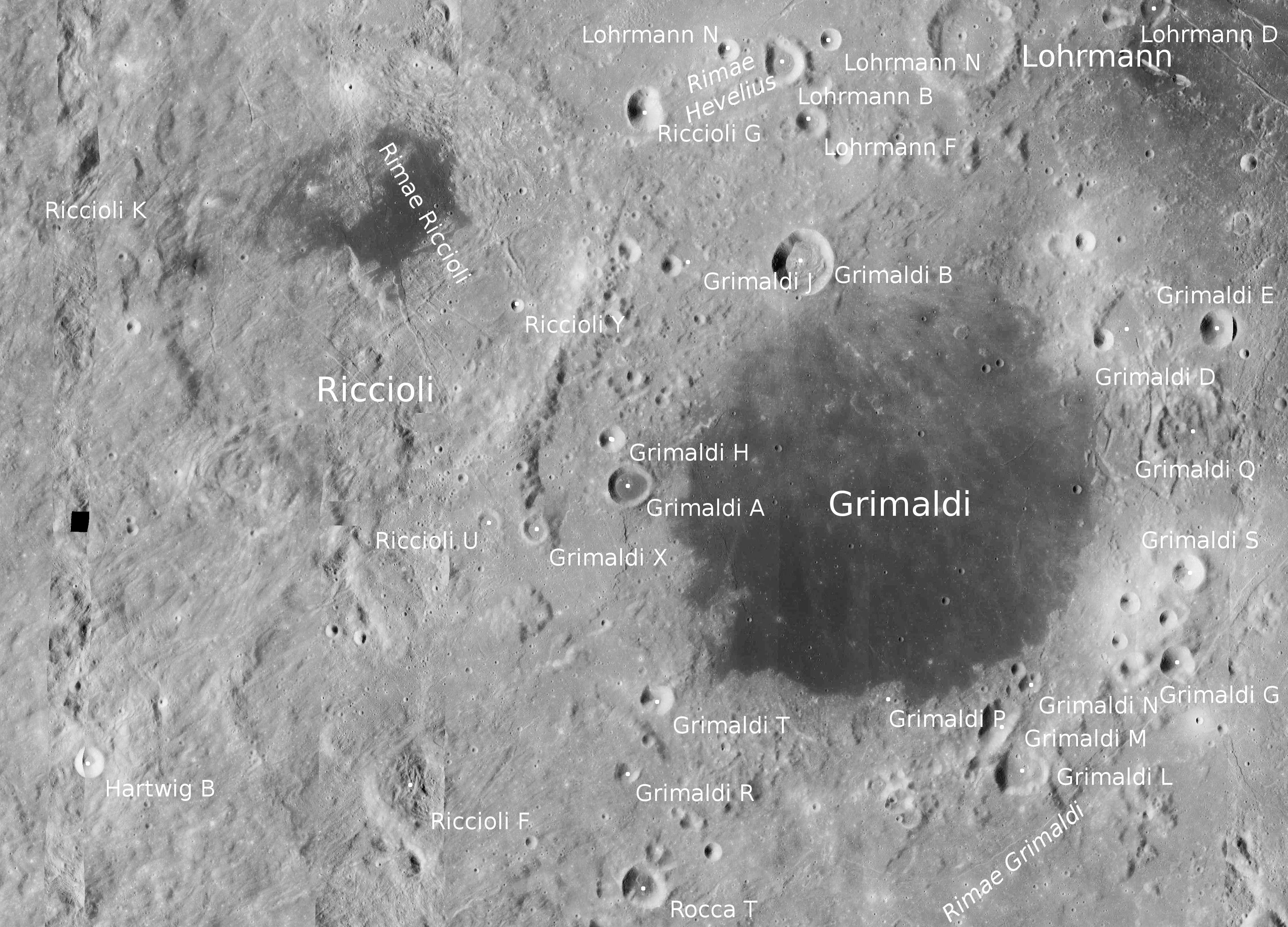
- LROC - WAC
- Coordinates: 5.2°S 68.6°W
- Diameter: 173.49 km
- Depth: 2.7 km
- Colongitude: 67° at sunrise
- Formation: Pre-Nectarian
- Eponym: Francesco M. Grimaldi

Grimaldi is a large basin located near the western limb of the Moon. This class of formation is known as a peak ring basin, which has a single interior topographic ring or a discontinuous ring of peaks with no central peak. It lies to the southwest of the Oceanus Procellarum, and southeast of the crater Riccioli. Between Oceanus Procellarum is Damoiseau, and to the north is Lohrmann. It is named after Francesco Maria Grimaldi.

The inner wall of Grimaldi has been so heavily worn and eroded by subsequent impacts that it forms a low, irregular ring of hills, ridges and peaks, rather than a typical crater rim. However, there are peaks remaining that reach heights of over 2 kilometers. The mare lava floor is the most notable feature of this crater, forming a flat, relatively smooth and featureless surface with a particularly low albedo. The dark shade of the floor contrasts with the brighter surroundings and high albedo bowl-shaped craters such as Grimaldi D, Grimaldi S, and several unnamed bright craters, making the dark crater easy to locate. The approximate diameter of the inner rim is 174 kilometers.

Beyond the basin are the scattered remnants of an outer wall, which has a diameter of 220 kilometers. This exterior rim is more intact to the north and west of the crater than elsewhere. To the southeast of Grimaldi is a system of rilles named the Rimae Grimaldi. To the northwest, rilles belonging to the Rimae Riccioli approach the western edge of Grimaldi's rim.

A mass concentration (mascon), or gravitational high, has been identified in the center of Grimaldi (corresponding with the mare). The mascon was mapped at high resolution by GRAIL.

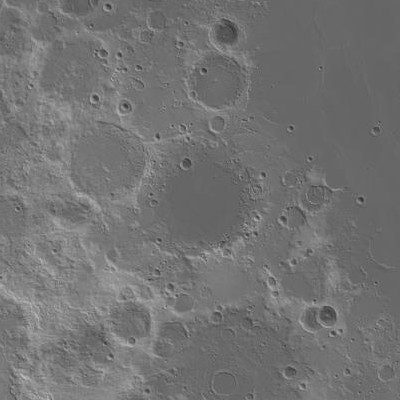
Topographic map of the basin

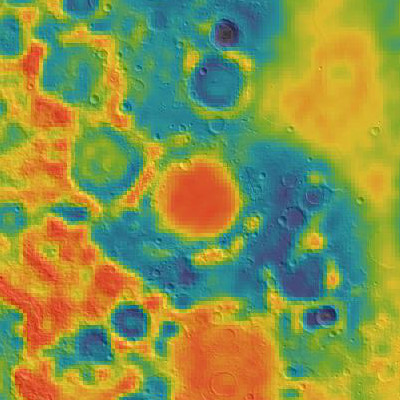
Gravity map based on GRAIL

Grimaldi has a history of transient lunar phenomena, including occasional flashes of light, color patches, and areas of hazy visibility. Gaseous emissions from this area have also been detected using spectroscopy.

== Satellite craters ==
By convention these features are identified on lunar maps by placing the letter on the side of the crater midpoint that is closest to Grimaldi.

Grimaldi	Latitude	Longitude	Diameter
A	5.4° S	71.2° W	15 km
B	2.9° S	69.2° W	22 km
C	2.6° S	61.5° W	10 km
D	3.7° S	65.5° W	22 km
E	3.7° S	64.4° W	13 km
F	4.0° S	62.7° W	29 km
G	7.4° S	64.9° W	13 km
H	4.9° S	71.4° W	9 km
J	2.9° S	70.6° W	16 km
L	8.5° S	66.7° W	19 km
M	8.0° S	67.0° W	18 km
N	7.6° S	66.6° W	8 km
P	8.0° S	68.3° W	10 km
Q	4.8° S	64.8° W	21 km
R	8.5° S	71.2° W	9 km
S	6.4° S	65.0° W	11 km
T	7.7° S	70.9° W	12 km
X	5.8° S	72.3° W	9 km
