= Hevelius (crater) =

Crater on the Moon

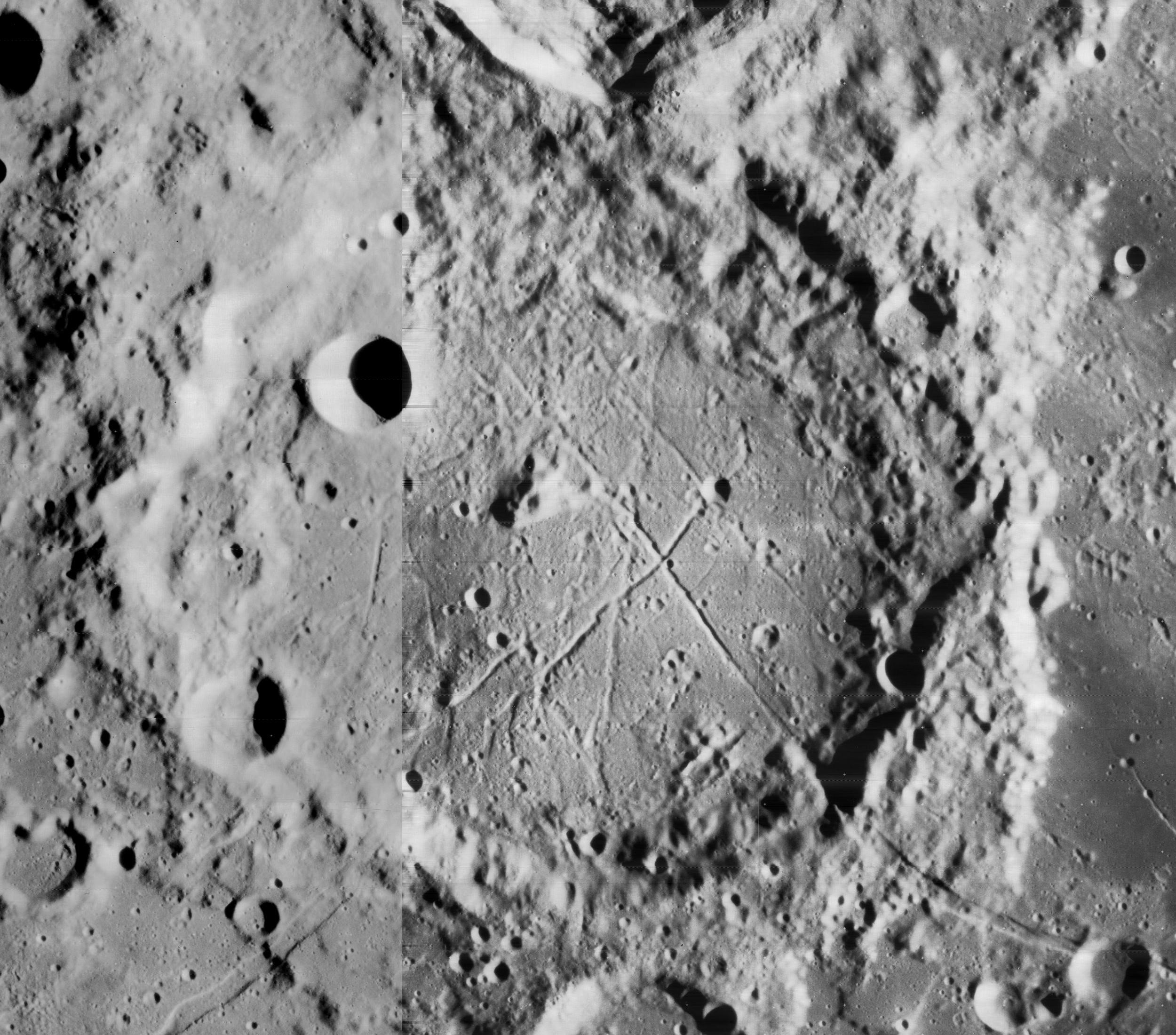
- Mosaic of Lunar Orbiter 4 images
- Coordinates: 2.2°N 67.3°W
- Diameter: 106 km
- Depth: 1.8 km
- Colongitude: 68° at sunrise
- Formation: Nectarian
- Eponym: Johannes Hevelius

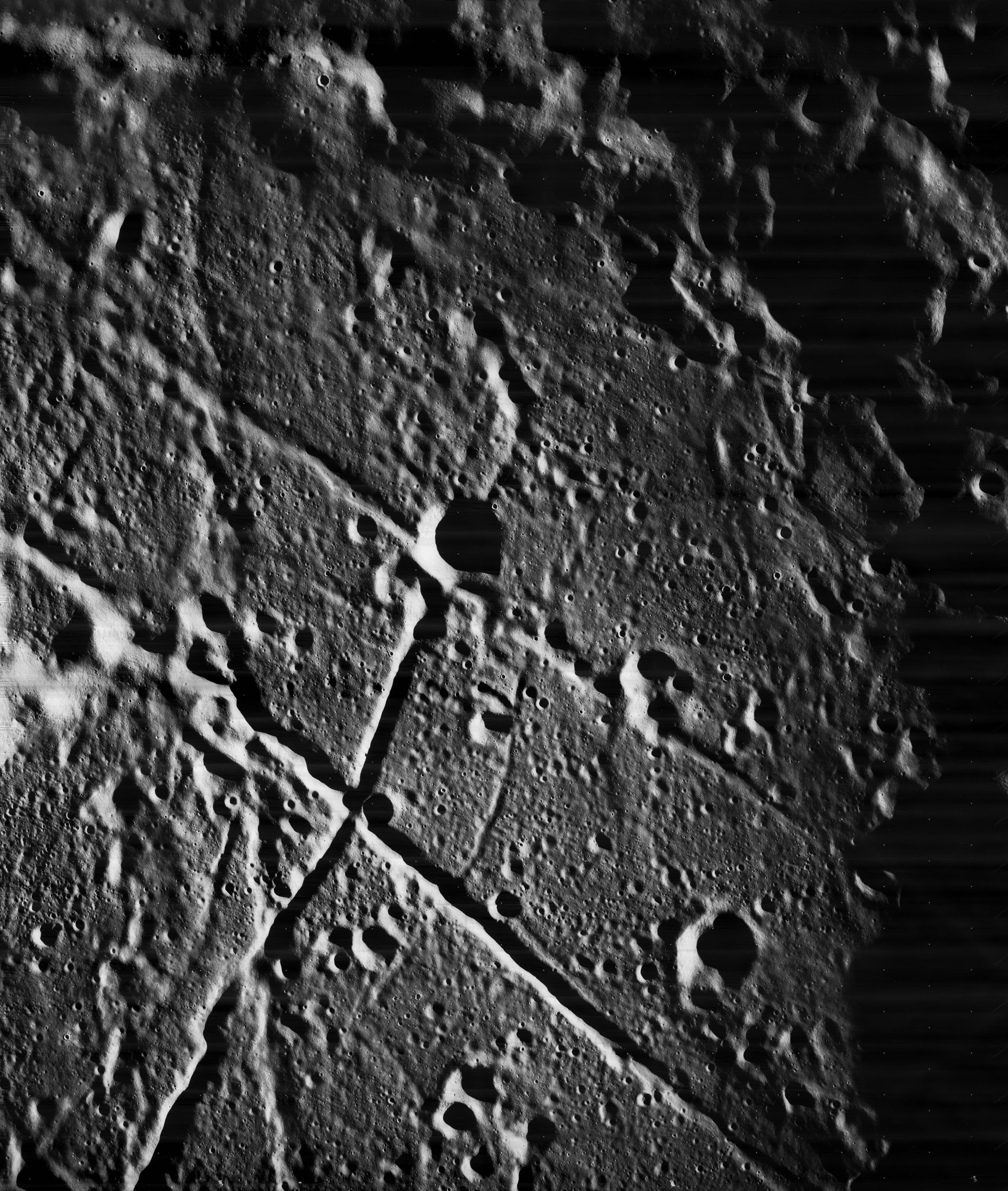
Closeup of the Rimae Hevelius at low sun angle, in the northeast portion of the crater floor. From Lunar Orbiter 3

Hevelius is a low-rimmed lunar impact crater that lies at the western edge of the Oceanus Procellarum, named after the astronomer Johannes Hevelius by the IAU in 1935. The smaller but prominent crater Cavalerius is joined to the northern rim by low ridges. Due south of Hevelius is the crater Lohrmann and the dark-hued Grimaldi.

The crater's name was approved by the IAU in 1970.

Only a low, eroded rim of Hevelius rises above the surface. The western wall is overlain by several small impacts. The flat floor of the crater has been flooded by lava, and is now cross-crossed by a system of small clefts named the Rimae Hevelius. There is a low, one-km-high central peak offset to the northwest of the midpoint. The northeastern part of the interior is more irregular and contains a straight ridge running toward the southeast. Along the northwest floor, near the inner wall, is a small crater.

Hevelius is a crater of Nectarian age.

This feature is sometimes referred to as Hevel, the astronomer's name in German (Hevelius is a Latinized form).

== Satellite craters ==
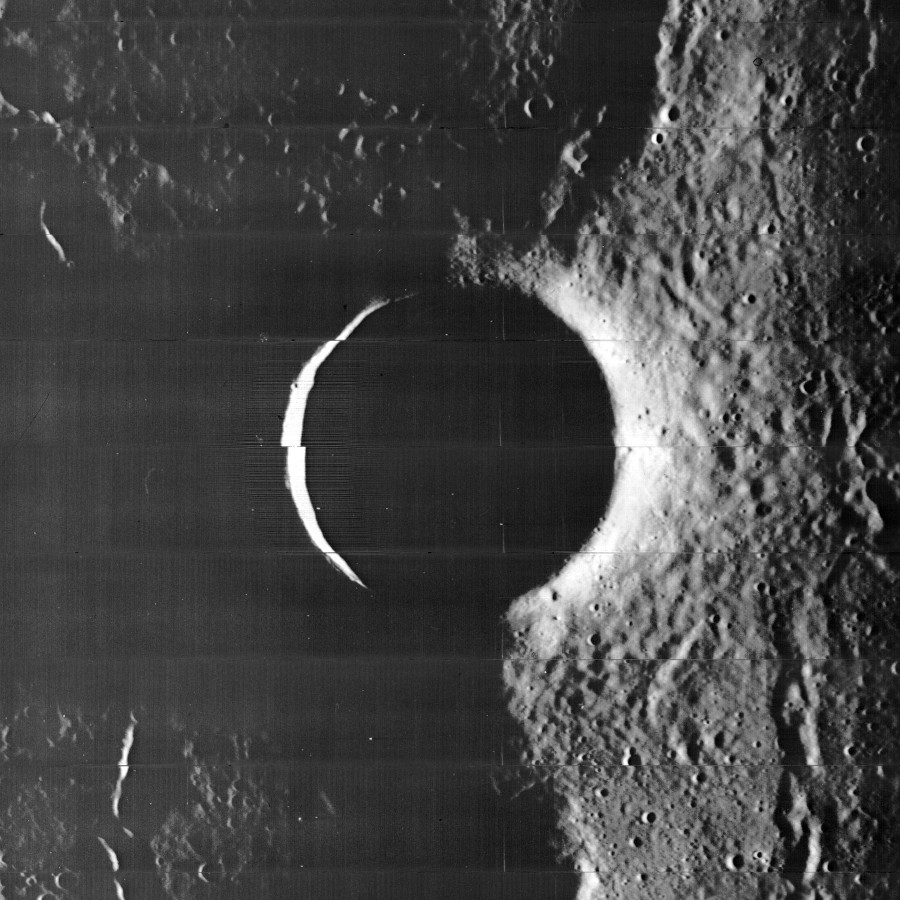
Hevelius D image from Lunar Orbiter 1

By convention these features are identified on lunar maps by placing the letter on the side of the crater midpoint that is closest to Hevelius.

Hevelius	Latitude	Longitude	Diameter
A	2.9° N	68.1° W	14 km
B	1.4° N	68.8° W	14 km
D	3.1° N	60.8° W	8 km
E	2.9° N	65.7° W	9 km
J	0.7° N	69.7° W	14 km
K	1.5° N	70.0° W	6 km
L	2.0° N	70.3° W	7 km
