= Glushko (crater) =

Crater on the Moon

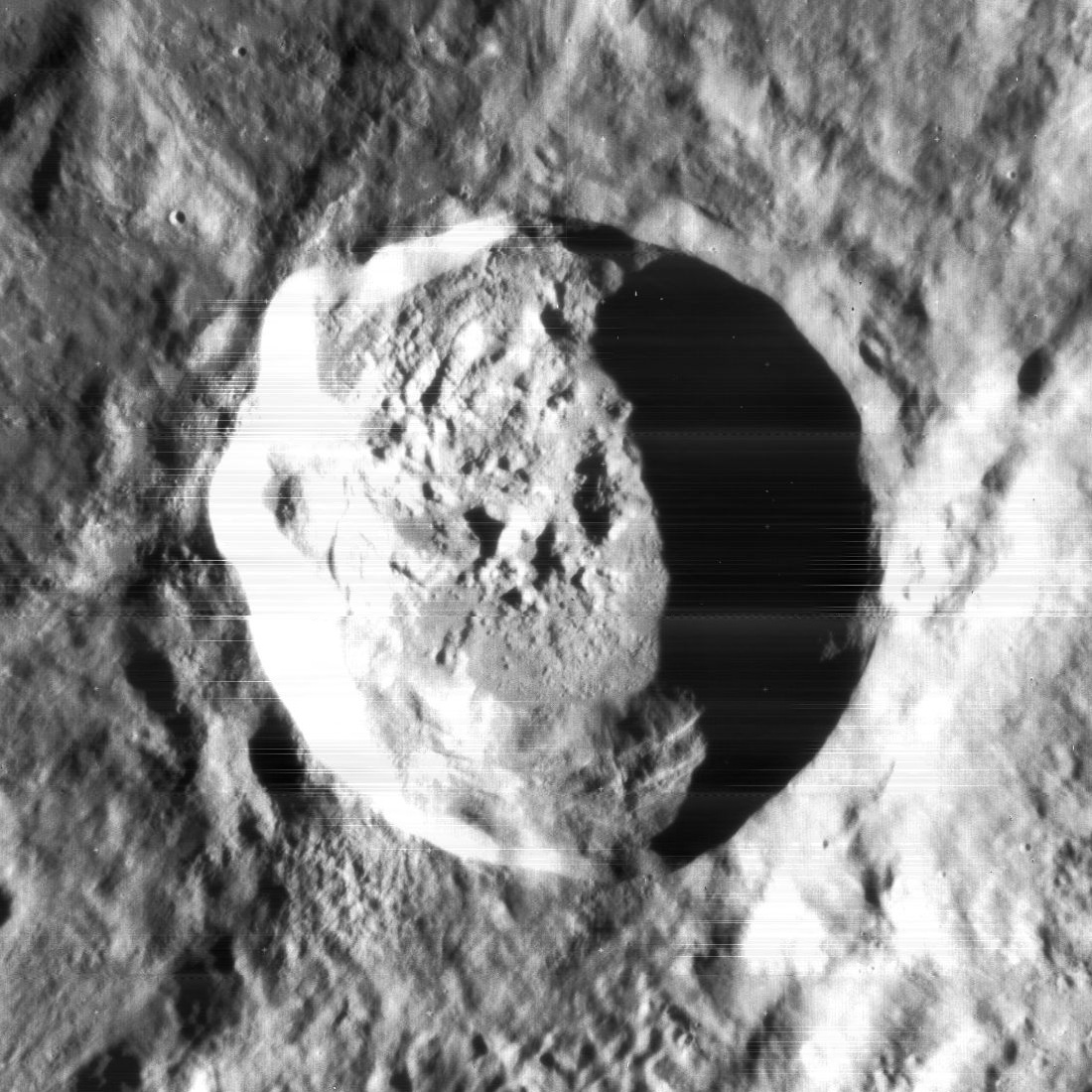
- Lunar Orbiter 4 image
- Coordinates: 8.4°N 77.6°W
- Diameter: 43 km
- Depth: Unknown
- Colongitude: 78° at sunrise
- Eponym: Valentin P. Glushko

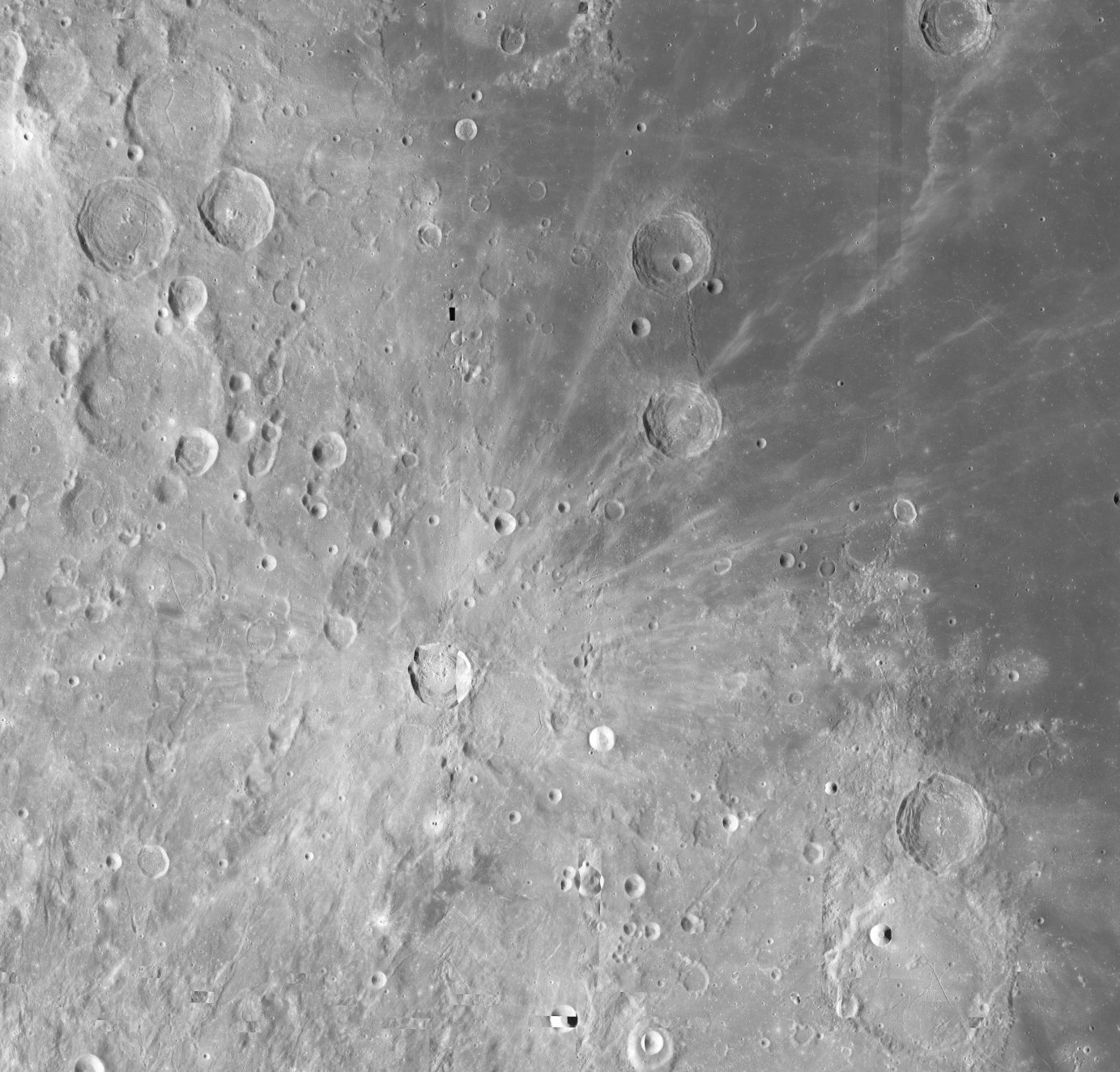
The extent of Glushko's ray system. LRO mosaic.

Glushko is a young impact crater on the Moon attached to the western rim of the crater Olbers.

The initial name for this crater was Olbers A. The current name was given in 1994 in honor of Valentin Petrovich Glushko (1908–1989) - a rocket scientist, academician of the Academy of Sciences of Ukraine and the Academy of Sciences of the USSR, engineer, prominent Soviet scientist in the field of rocket and space technology, and the founder of Soviet liquid-rocket-engine engineering.

Glushko possesses a relatively high albedo and is the focus of a prominent ray system that extends in all directions across the nearby surface. It has sharp, well-defined features that, combined with its higher albedo, are indicative of a relatively young impact crater. There is a small outer rampart, and material along the inner walls has slumped to form shelves and ramparts. There are three outward bulges in the rim to the north and northwest.

Due to its prominent rays, Glushko is mapped as part of the Copernican System.
