= Schlüter (crater) =

Crater on the Moon

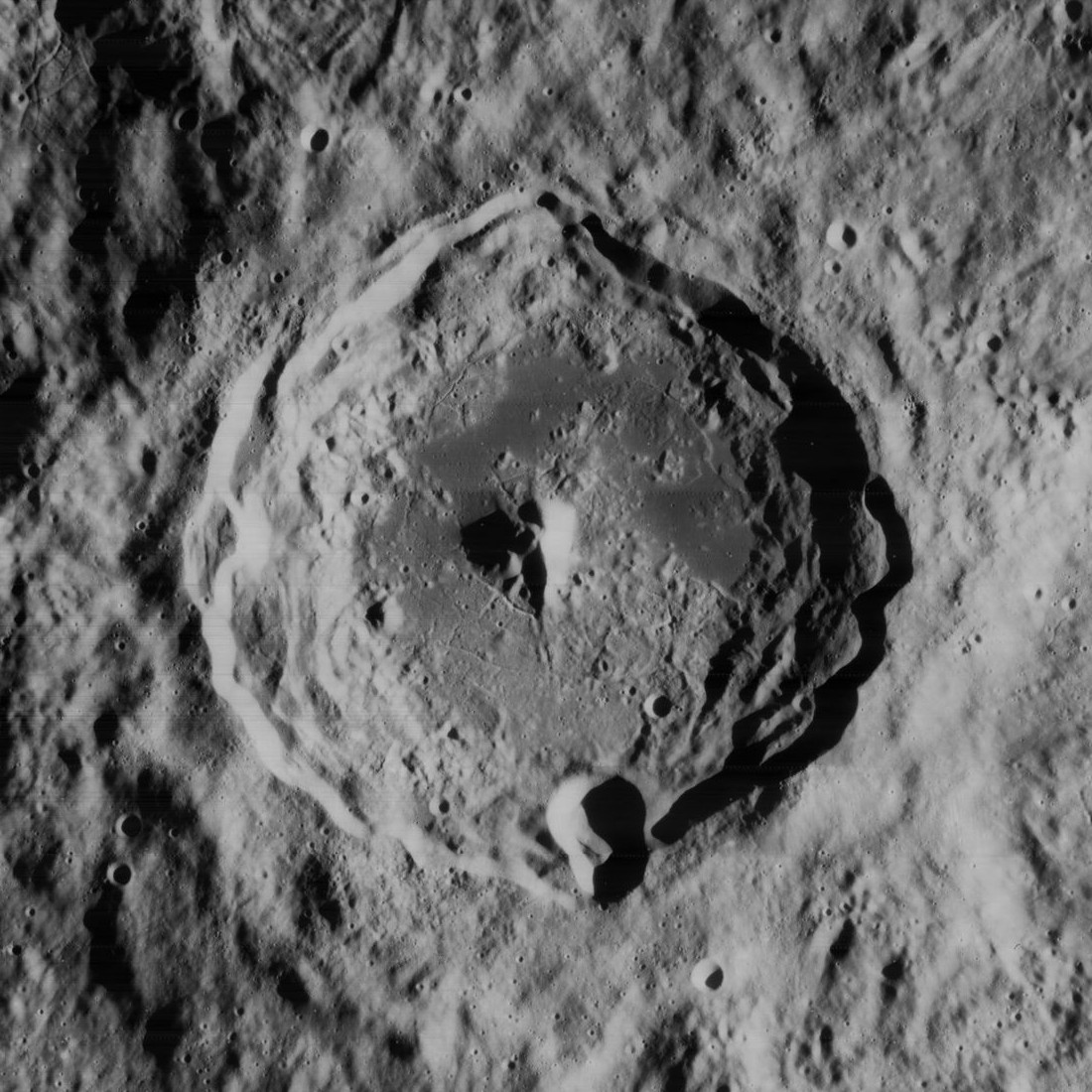
- Lunar Orbiter 4 image
- Coordinates: 5.9°S 83.3°W
- Diameter: 89 km
- Depth: Unknown
- Colongitude: 84° at sunrise
- Formation: Upper Imbrian
- Eponym: Heinrich Schlüter

Schlüter is a lunar impact crater that is located near the western limb of the Moon's near side. It lies along the northwestern face of the Montes Cordillera mountain range that encircles the Mare Orientale. Nearly attached to the eastern rim is the damaged crater Hartwig.

On the lunar geologic timescale, Schlüter dates to the Upper (Late) Imbrian age. This formation has an irregular outer rim that is roughly circular, with small outward bulges to the north and southeast. The former section displays a slumped appearance along the inner wall. The southern rim contains a small double-crater that lies long the inner wall. The rim is otherwise not significantly eroded, and contains a system of terraces along the inner sides.

The interior floor has a curved patch of low-albedo material along the northern inner wall, nearly matching the dark shade of the Lacus Autumni to the south of the Montes Cordillera range. It is a floor-fractured crater, with the remainder of the floor having the same albedo as the surrounding terrain. In the midpoint of the floor is a central peak, consisting of an elongated ridge with the long dimension aligned in a northerly direction. The infrared spectrum of pure crystalline plagioclase has been identified on this rise. There is a slender rille near the northwestern inner wall.

This crater is named after German astronomer Heinrich Schlüter (1815–1844).

== Satellite craters ==
By convention these features are identified on lunar maps by placing the letter on the side of the crater midpoint that is closest to Schlüter.

Schlüter	Latitude	Longitude	Diameter
A	9.2° S	82.4° W	37 km
P	0.1° N	85.1° W	20 km
S	7.9° S	89.9° W	13 km
U	5.0° S	89.9° W	10 km
V	4.4° S	86.8° W	12 km
X	1.2° N	88.2° W	13 km
Z	2.8° S	83.7° W	11 km
