= Riccioli (crater) =

Crater on the Moon

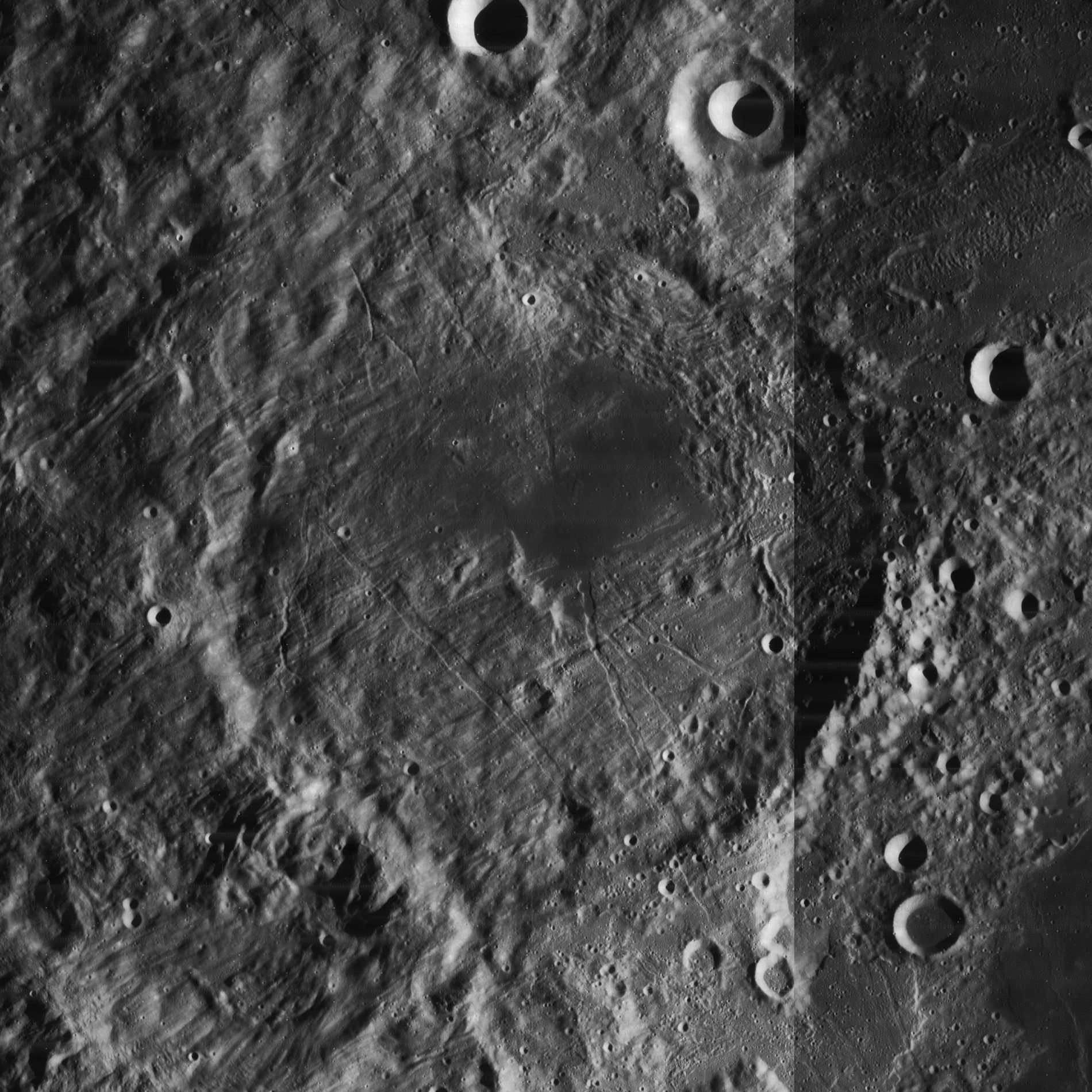
- Mosaic of Lunar Orbiter 4 images
- Coordinates: 2.9°S 74.42°W
- Diameter: 155.66 km (96.72 mi)
- Depth: 2.3 km
- Colongitude: 75° at sunrise
- Eponym: Giovanni B. Riccioli

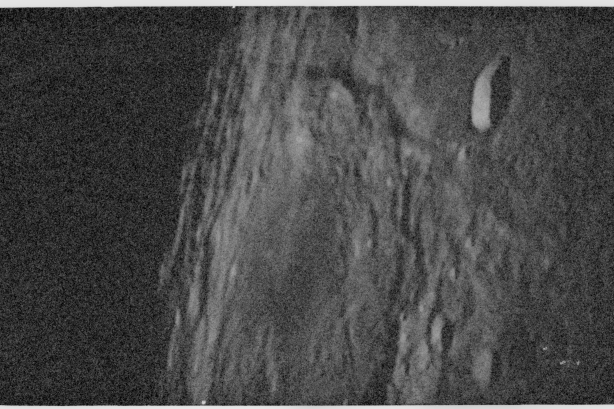
Riccioli crater in earthshine, from Apollo 16.

Riccioli is a lunar impact crater located near the western limb of the Moon. It lies just to the northwest of a larger crater, Grimaldi. To the southwest are the craters Hartwig and Schlüter that lie on the northeastern edge of Montes Cordillera, a ring-shaped range that surrounds Mare Orientale. Due to its location, Riccioli appears strongly foreshortened from the earth and is viewed almost from the side.

== Appearance ==
Riccioli is older than the Orientale basin to the southwest because the ejecta from the impact that created the Orientale basin overlies the crater. This debris lies in ridges that regionally trend northeast–southwest, but trend in a direction parallel to Riccioli's northeast wall in that part of the crater.

A system of rilles named the Rimae Riccioli lies across the interior, and crosscut the ejecta ridges. In the northern half of the interior, the dark covering of lava that resurfaced the floor is visible, and covers some of the ejecta ridges and floods some of the rilles.

== Name origin ==
The crater is named after Giovanni Battista Riccioli, an Italian Jesuit astronomer who introduced the system of lunar nomenclature that is still in use today. He was also the first person to measure the rate of acceleration of a freely-falling body.

== Satellite craters ==
By convention these features are identified on lunar maps by placing the letter on the side of the crater midpoint that is closest to Riccioli.

Riccioli	Latitude	Longitude	Diameter
C	0.6° N	73.0° W	31 km
CA	0.6° N	73.0° W	14 km
F	8.6° S	73.9° W	28 km
G	1.3° S	71.0° W	15 km
H	1.1° N	74.9° W	18 km
K	2.2° S	77.5° W	43 km
U	5.7° S	72.8° W	9 km
Y	3.0° S	73.2° W	7 km
