= Lunar 100 =

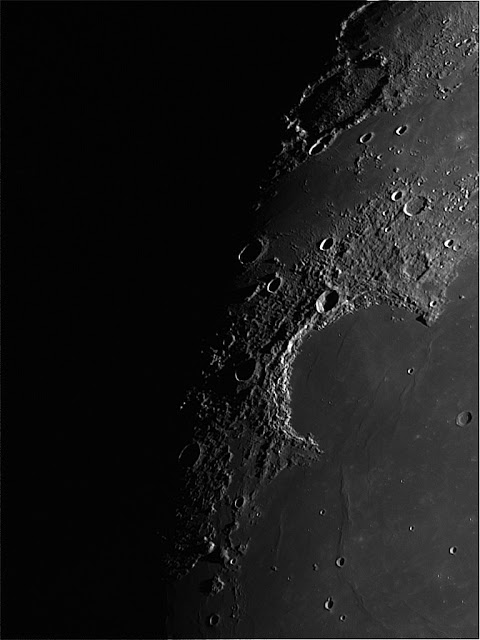
L14 Sinus Iridum

The Lunar 100 (L100) is a list of one hundred of the most interesting features to observe on the Moon. The list was first described by Charles A. Wood in the article The Lunar 100 in Sky & Telescope magazine, April 2004.

With this selection, Wood tried to give astronomy fans a list similar to the Messier catalog of deep-sky objects, but of a more familiar object, the Moon. The objects listed include craters, seas, mountains and other features, and are arranged in ascending order of observational difficulty. The Moon is L1, L2 is Earthshine, L3 is the contrast between the dark seas and the lighter highlands. Starting from L4 we have geological features, such as craters (Tycho, L6), valleys (Vallis Schröteri, L17) and mountains (Leibnitz Mountains, L96). The last entry is L100, the magnetic swirls of Marginis Sea.

== Lunar 100 - list ==
L	Feature Name	Significance	Lat. (°)	Long. (°)	Diam. (km)
L1	Moon	Large satellite	—	—	3.476
L2	Earthshine	Twice reflected sunlight	—	—	
L3	Mare/highland dichotomy	Two materials with distinct compositions	—	—	
L4	Apennines	Imbrium basin rim	18.9N	3.7W	70
L5	Copernicus	Archetypal large complex crater	9.7N	20.1W	93
L6	Tycho	Large rayed crater with impact melts	43.4S	11.1W	85
L7	Altai Scarp	Nectaris basin rim	24.3S	22.6E	425
L8	Theophilus, Cyrillus, Catharina	Crater sequence illustrating stages of degradation	13.2S	24.0E	—
L9	Clavius	Lacks basin features in spite of its size	58.8S	14.1W	225
L10	Mare Crisium	Mare contained in large circular basin	18.0N	59.0E	540
L11	Aristarchus	Very bright crater with dark bands on its walls	23.7N	47.4W	40
L12	Proclus	Oblique-impact rays	16.1N	46.8E	28
L13	Gassendi	Floor-fractured crater	17.6S	40.1W	101
L14	Sinus Iridum	Very large crater with missing rim	45.0N	32.0W	260
L15	Straight Wall	Best example of a lunar fault	21.8S	7.8W	110
L16	Petavius	Crater with domed and fractured floor	25.1S	60.4E	177
L17	Schröter's Valley	Giant sinuous rille	26.2N	50.8W	168
L18	Mare Serenitatis dark edges	Distinct mare areas with different compositions	17.8N	23.0E	N/A
L19	Alpine Valley	Lunar graben	49.0N	3.0E	165
L20	Posidonius	Floor-fractured crater	31.8N	29.9E	95
L21	Fracastorius	Crater with subsided and fractured floor	21.5S	33.2E	124
L22	Aristarchus plateau	Mysterious uplifted region mantled with pyroclastics	26.0N	51.0W	150
L23	Pico	Isolated Imbrium basin-ring fragment	45.7N	8.9W	25
L24	Hyginus Rille	Rille containing rimless collapse pits	7.4N	7.8E	220
L25	Messier & Messier A	Oblique ricochet-impact pair	1.9S	47.6E	11
L26	Mare Frigoris	Arcuate mare of uncertain origin	56.0N	1.4E	1600
L27	Archimedes	Large crater lacking central peak	29.7N	4.0W	83
L28	Hipparchus	First drawing of a single crater	5.5S	4.8E	150
L29	Ariadaeus Rille	Long, linear graben	6.4N	14.0E	250
L30	Schiller	Possible oblique impact	51.9S	39.0W	180
L31	Taruntius	Young floor-fractured crater	5.6N	46.5E	56
L32	Arago Alpha & Beta	Volcanic domes	6.2N	21.4E	26
L33	Serpentine Ridge	Basin inner-ring segment	27.3N	25.3E	155
L34	Lacus Mortis	Strange crater with rille and ridge	45.0N	27.2E	152
L35	Triesnecker Rilles	Rille family	4.3N	4.6E	215
L36	Grimaldi basin	A small two-ring basin	5.5S	68.3W	440
L37	Bailly	Barely discernible basin	66.5S	69.1W	303
L38	Sabine and Ritter	Possible twin impacts	1.7N	19.7E	30
L39	Schickard	Crater floor with Orientale basin ejecta stripe	44.3S	55.3W	227
L40	Janssen Rille	Rare example of a highland rille	45.4S	39.3E	190
L41	Bessel ray	Ray of uncertain origin near Bessel	21.8N	17.9E	N/A
L42	Marius Hills	Complex of volcanic domes & hills	12.5N	54.0W	125
L43	Wargentin	A crater filled to the rim with lava or ejecta	49.6S	60.2W	84
L44	Mersenius	Domed floor cut by secondary craters	21.5S	49.2W	84
L45	Maurolycus	Region of saturation cratering	42.0S	14.0E	114
L46	Regiomontanus central peak	Possible volcanic peak	28.0S	0.6W	124
L47	Alphonsus dark spots	Dark-halo eruptions on crater floor	13.7S	3.2W	119
L48	Cauchy region	Fault, rilles and domes	10.5N	38.0E	130
L49	Gruithuisen Delta and Gamma	Volcanic domes formed with viscous lavas	36.3N	40.0W	20
L50	Cayley Plains	Light, smooth plains of uncertain origin	4.0N	15.1E	14
L51	Davy crater chain	Result of comet-fragment impacts	11.1S	6.6W	50
L52	Crüger	Possible volcanic caldera	16.7S	66.8W	45
L53	Lamont	Possible buried basin	4.4N	23.7E	106
L54	Hippalus Rilles	Rilles concentric to Humorum basin	24.5S	29.0W	240
L55	Baco	Unusually smooth crater floor and surrounding plains	51.0S	19.1E	69
L56	Australe basin	A partially flooded ancient basin	49.8S	84.5E	880
L57	Reiner Gamma	Conspicuous swirl and magnetic anomaly	7.7N	59.2W	70
L58	Rheita Valley	Basin secondary-crater chain	42.5S	51.5E	445
L59	Schiller-Zucchius basin	Badly degraded overlooked basin	56.0S	45.0W	335
L60	Kies Pi	Volcanic dome	26.9S	24.2W	45
L61	Mösting A	Simple crater close to center of lunar near side	3.2S	5.2W	13
L62	Rümker	Large volcanic dome	40.8N	58.1W	70
L63	Imbrium sculpture	Basin ejecta near and overlying Boscovich and Julius Caesar	11.0N	12.0E	—
L64	Descartes	Apollo 16 landing site; putative region of highland volcanism	11.7S	15.7E	48
L65	Hortensius domes	Dome field north of Hortensius	7.6N	27.9W	10
L66	Hadley Rille	Lava channel near Apollo 15 landing site	25.0N	3.0E	—
L67	Fra Mauro formation	Apollo 14 landing site on Imbrium ejecta	3.6S	17.5W	—
L68	Flamsteed P	Proposed young volcanic crater and Surveyor 1 landing site	3.0S	44.0W	112
L69	Copernicus secondary craters	Rays and craterlets near Pytheas	19.6N	19.1W	4
L70	Humboldtianum basin	Multi-ring impact basin	57.0N	80.0E	650
L71	Sulpicius Gallus dark mantle	Ash eruptions northwest of crater	19.6N	11.6E	12
L72	Atlas dark-halo craters	Explosive volcanic pits on the floor of Atlas	46.7N	44.4E	87
L73	Smythii basin	Difficult-to-observe basin scarp and mare	2.0S	87.0E	740
L74	Copernicus H	Dark-halo impact crater	6.9N	18.3W	5
L75	Ptolemaeus B	Saucer-like depression on the floor of Ptolemaeus	8.0S	0.8W	16
L76	W. Bond	Large crater degraded by Imbrium ejecta	65.3N	3.7E	158
L77	Sirsalis Rille	Procellarum basin radial rilles	15.7S	61.7W	425
L78	Lambert R	A buried "ghost" crater	23.8N	20.6W	54
L79	Sinus Aestuum	Eastern dark-mantle volcanic deposit	12.0N	3.5W	90
L80	Orientale basin	Youngest large impact basin	19.0S	95.0W	930
L81	Hesiodus A	Concentric crater	30.1S	17.0W	15
L82	Linné	Small crater once thought to have disappeared	27.7N	11.8E	2.4
L83	Plato craterlets	Crater pits at limits of detection	51.6N	9.4W	101
L84	Pitatus	Crater with concentric rilles	29.8S	13.5W	97
L85	Langrenus rays	Aged ray system	8.9S	60.9E	132
L86	Prinz Rilles	Rille system near the crater Prinz	27.0N	43.0W	46
L87	Humboldt	Crater with central peaks and dark spots	27.0S	80.9E	207
L88	Peary	Difficult-to-observe polar crater	88.6N	33.0E	74
L89	Valentine Dome	Volcanic dome	30.5N	10.1E	30
L90	Armstrong, Aldrin and Collins	Small craters near the Apollo 11 landing site	1.3N	23.7E	3
L91	De Gasparis Rilles	Area with many rilles	25.9S	50.7W	30
L92	Gyldén Valley	Part of the Imbrium radial sculpture	5.1S	0.7E	47
L93	Dionysius rays	Unusual and rare dark rays	2.8N	17.3E	18
L94	Drygalski	Large south-pole region crater	79.3S	84.9W	162
L95	Procellarum basin	The Moon's biggest basin?	23.0N	15.0W	3200
L96	Leibnitz Mountains	Rim of South Pole-Aitken basin	85.0S	30.0E	—
L97	Inghirami Valley	Orientale basin ejecta	44.0S	73.0W	140
L98	Imbrium lava flows	Mare lava-flow boundaries	32.8N	22.0W	—
L99	Ina	D-shaped young volcanic caldera	18.6N	5.3E	3
L100	Mare Marginis swirls	Possible magnetic field deposits	18.5N	88.0E	—
