= August 1970 =

Month of 1970

<<	August 1970					>>
Su	Mo	Tu	We	Th	Fr	Sa
						1
2	3	4	5	6	7	8
9	10	11	12	13	14	15
16	17	18	19	20	21	22
23	24	25	26	27	28	29
30	31

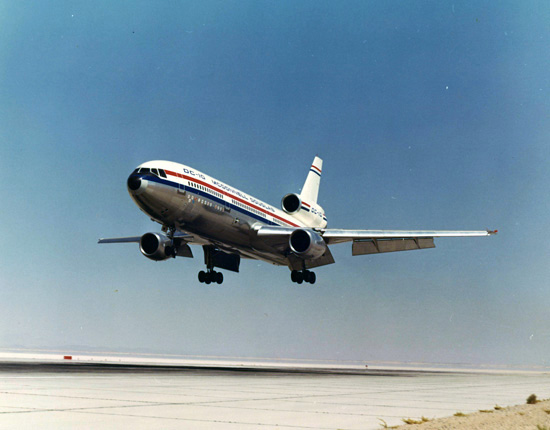
August 29, 1970: The DC-10 jumbo jet makes its first flight

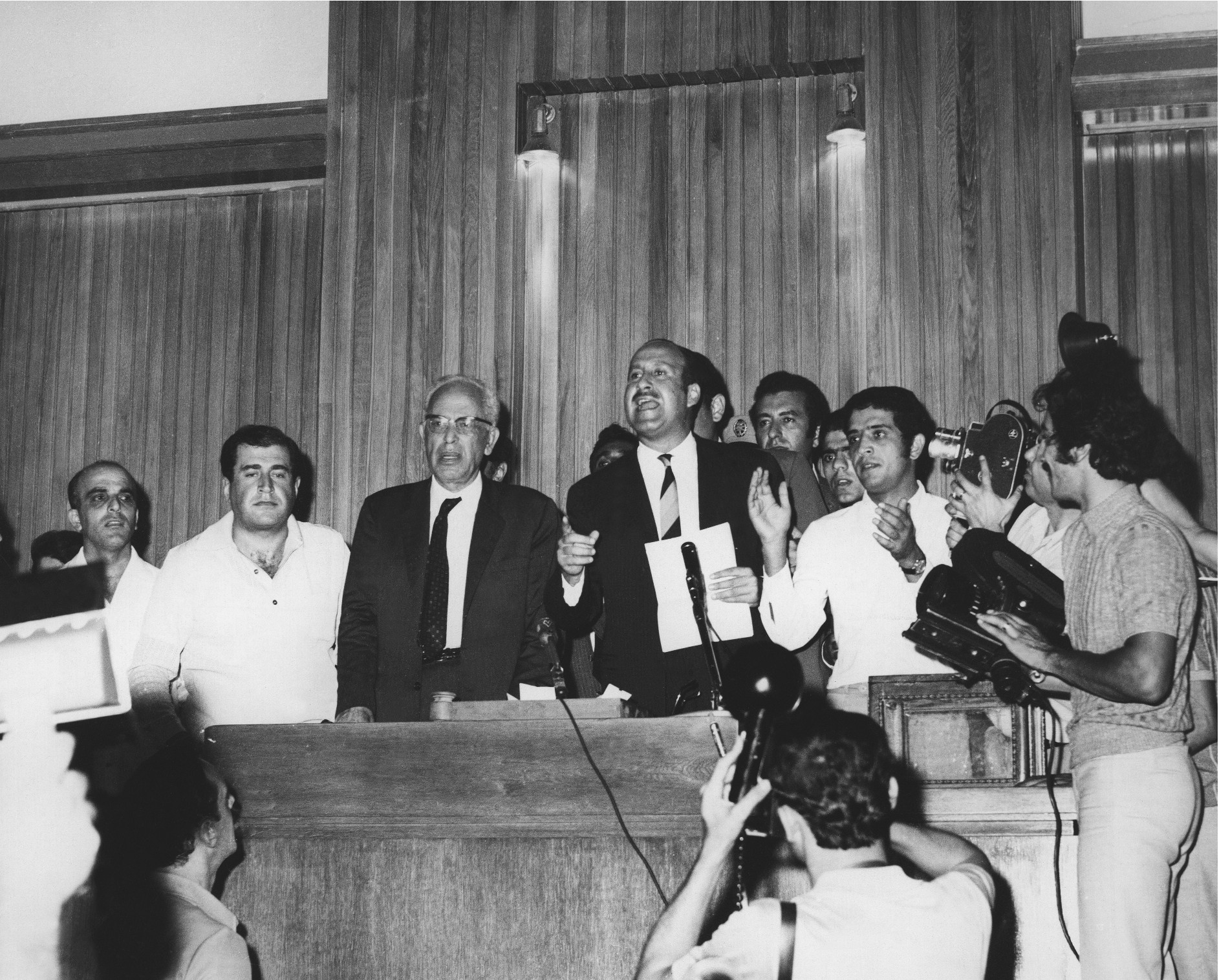
August 17, 1970: Lebanon's President Franjieh elected by margin of one vote

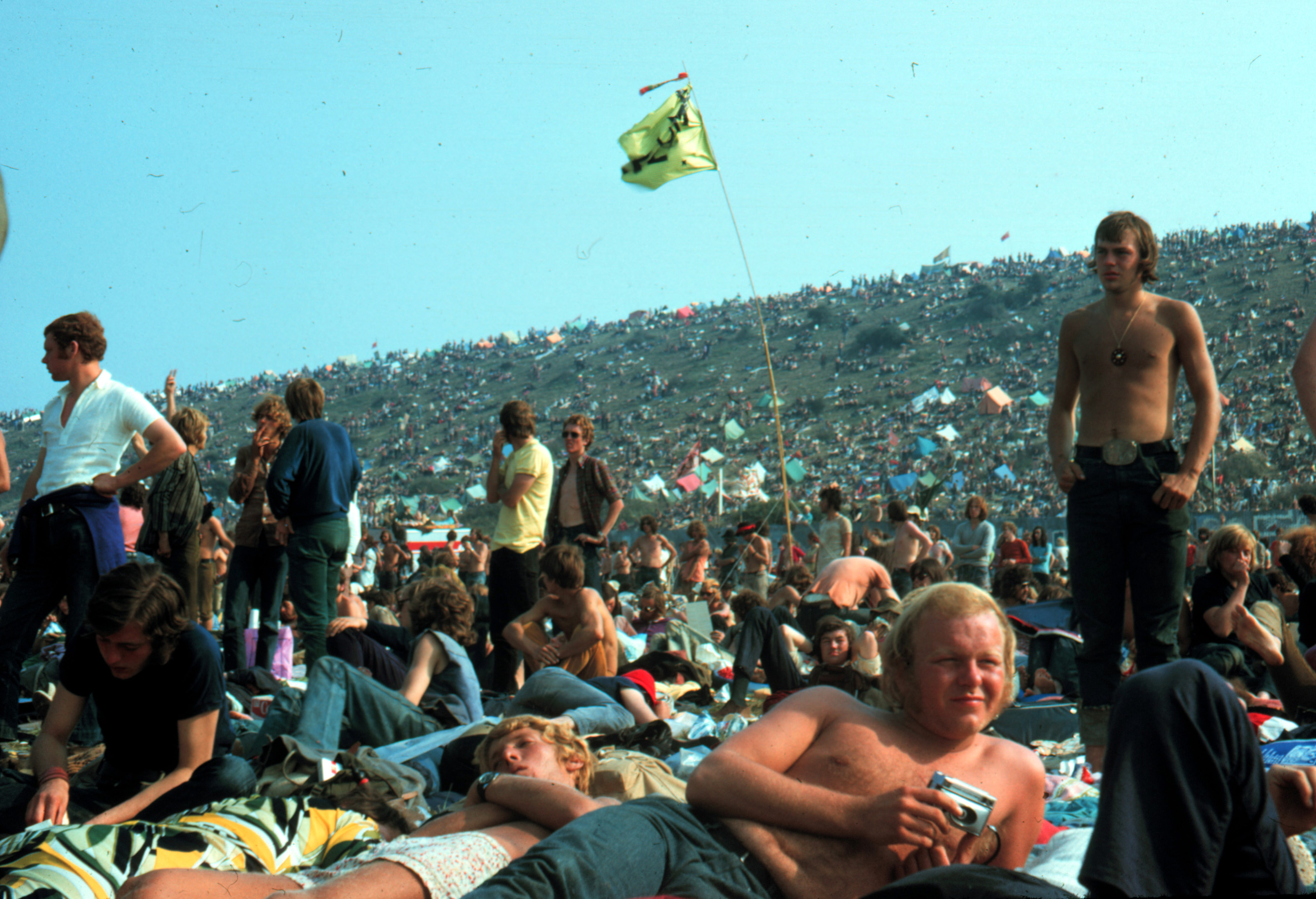
August 26–30, 1970: Isle of Wight Festival attracts 250,000 at huge financial loss

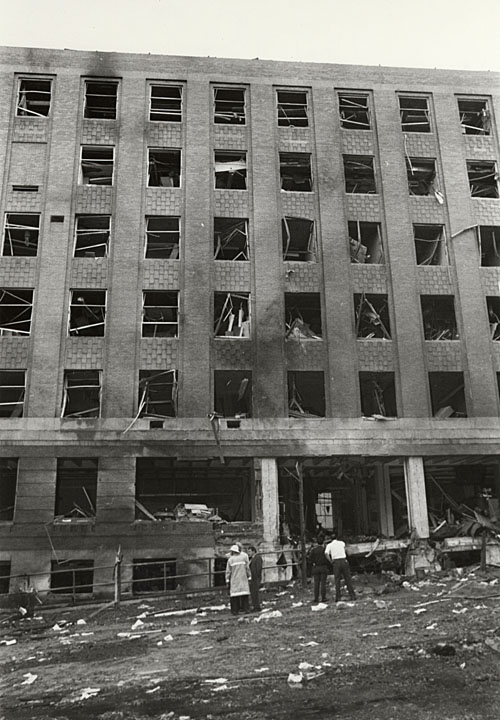
August 24, 1970: Ammonium nitrate bomb in stolen van rocks University of Wisconsin

The following events occurred in August 1970:

== August 1, 1970 (Saturday) ==
- The capsizing of the ferryboat MV Christena killed 233 passengers and crew when the overloaded vessel was making the 12 mi (19 km) journey between the islands of Saint Kitts and Nevis. The ferry's rated capacity was no more than 155 people, but it was carrying 324 when it departed Basseterre on Saint Christopher Island (commonly called "Saint Kitts") on its way to Charlestown on the island of Nevis. Only 91 people were rescued, and 123 bodies were recovered, more than half of them unidentifiable. The remaining 110 people were trapped on the Christena when it sank.
- British Honduras, now called Belize changed its capital from Belize City to Belmopan because of the devastating destruction of Belize City by Hurricane Hattie in 1961.
- Born:
  - Elon Lindenstrauss, Israeli mathematician, in Jerusalem
  - David James, England National Team football soccer goalkeeper, in Welwyn Garden City, Hertfordshire
- Died:
  - Otto Heinrich Warburg, 86, German physician and 1931 laureate of the Nobel Prize in Physiology or Medicine for his discovery of the enzyme that triggered the metabolism of cancerous cells and tumors
  - Frances Farmer, 56, American film and television actress, from esophageal cancer

== August 2, 1970 (Sunday) ==
- Rubber bullets, designed by the UK's Ministry of Defence as a non-lethal method of riot control, were used for the first time. The "L2A2", made of hard rubber, was first employed by the British Army against protesters in Northern Ireland, particularly children. Because they were "highly inaccurate", the bullets were fired into crowds, often by "skip firing" to bounce the projectiles off of the ground and into groups. Although the intent was to cause pain without killing or maiming an individual, the bullets caused numerous serious injuries and several deaths; over 55,000 would be fired during the Northern Ireland conflict until being discontinued at the end of 1974.
- For the first time, a "jumbo jet" was hijacked. Pan American Flight 299, which had made the first commercial Boeing 747 flight, was on its way from New York to San Juan, Puerto Rico. Shortly after midnight, one of the 360 passengers commandeered the aircraft brandished a gun and threatened to detonate explosives in his carry on luggage and demanded to be flown to Havana. Cuba's Premier Fidel Castro traveled to the Jose Marti Airport to discuss plans for the 747 pilot about how to safely take off from the airport's runways, which were not long enough to accommodate a large jet. The 747 took off for Miami after one hour in Cuba and safely returned. The aircraft, N736PA and designated as "Clipper Victor", would be destroyed in 1977 in the Tenerife airport disaster, after being struck by another Boeing 747 in the deadliest aviation disaster in history.
- U.S. Senate Majority Leader Mike Mansfield confirmed a report in The Washington Post that in 1963, President John F. Kennedy, had decided that he would order all U.S. troops to be withdrawn from South Vietnam after the 1964 presidential election. President Kennedy was assassinated before the election, and the new president, Lyndon Johnson ordered an increase of troops to a peak of half a million during his term of office
- Born:
  - Kevin Smith, American comedian and filmmaker, known for being "Silent Bob" in the Jay and Silent Bob film series; in Red Bank, New Jersey
  - Elijah Alexander, American NFL linebacker and fundraiser for multiple myeloma research; in Fort Worth, Texas (d. 2010)

== August 3, 1970 (Monday) ==
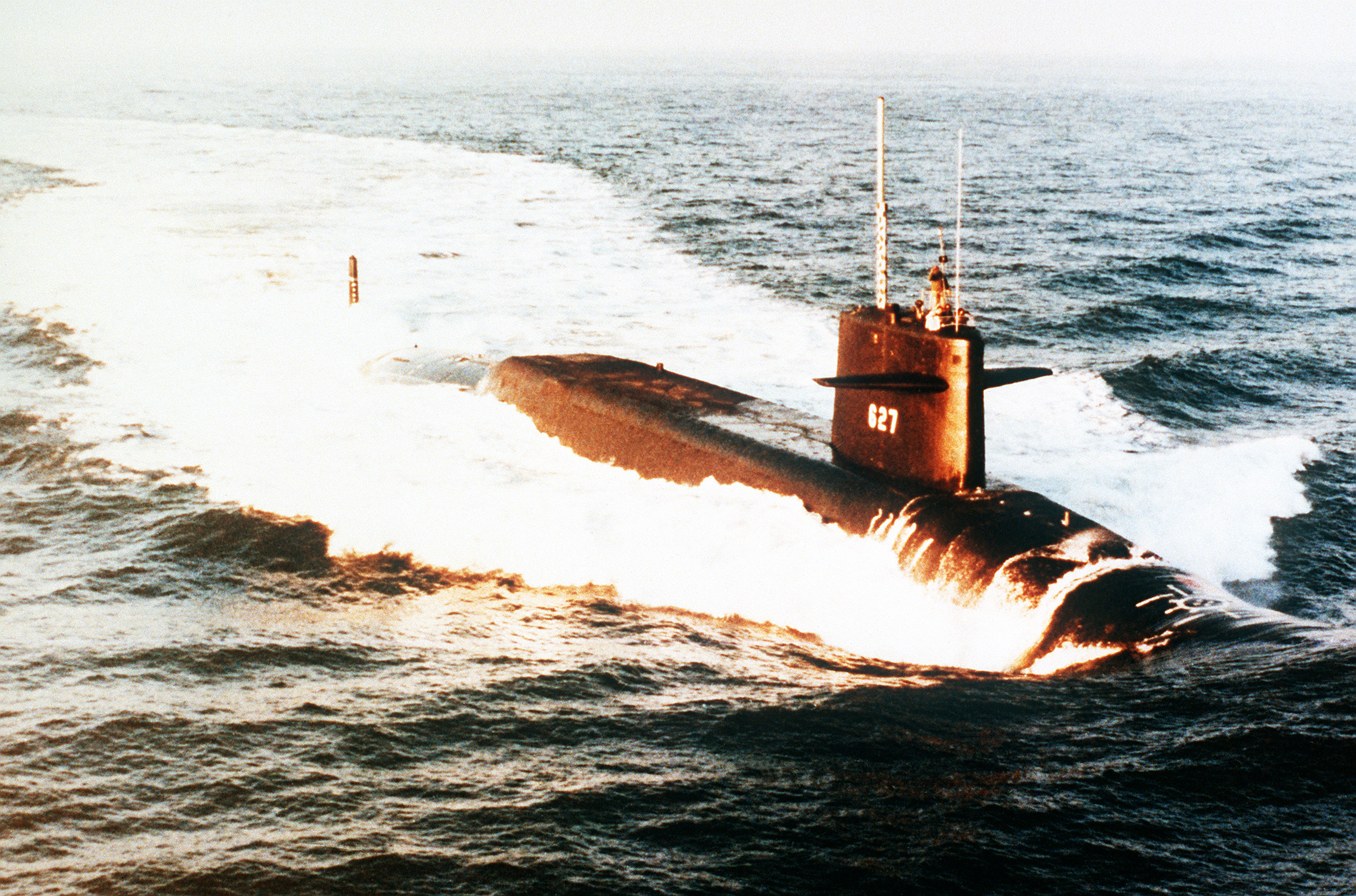
USS James Madison

- The United States Navy submarine USS James Madison made the first successful underwater test of the multi-warhead Poseidon C3 nuclear missile. Madison launched the unarmed missile skyward from a depth of 120 feet (37 m) and the rocket traveled 2,880 miles (4,630 km) to its intended target in the South Atlantic Ocean. Another U.S. Navy ship, the destroyer escort USS Calcaterra, positioned itself between the launch site and a Soviet surveillance trawler, the Leptev, to prevent close observation or the retrieval of debris from the launch. The Poseidon C3 missile was cleared by the Navy on March 31, 1971, for deployment aboard all ten of the James Madison-class submarines and the nine Lafayette-class submarines.
- Miriam Hargrave, a 62 year old English citizen who had been listed in the Guinness Book of Records for several years because of her consecutive failures on driver testing, was awarded a driver's license when she passed the test on her 40th try, after 39 failed tests. By then, she was sufficiently well known that her success made news worldwide. However, as Guinness noted in its next edition, she had spent so much money on driving lessons that she couldn't afford to buy a car.
- Born: Masahiro Sakurai, Japanese video game designer who created the Kirby series of games; in Musashimurayama, Tokyo

== August 4, 1970 (Tuesday) ==
- The government of British Honduras (now Belize) officially moved from Belize City into the new city of Belmopan, as Premier George Price convened the first cabinet meeting in the new capital.
- Delegates of Israel's conservative Gahal Party voted, 117 to 112, to withdraw the party's six cabinet members and to quit the government coalition. The walkout came after a nine-hour debate between moderate and conservative factions in the wake of a cabinet vote to accept terms of a U.S. peace proposal

== August 5, 1970 (Wednesday) ==
- Eleven residents of a low-rent apartment building, most of them retirees on a fixed income, were killed in a flash fire in downtown Minneapolis, Minnesota The quick spread of the blaze in the 3-story "217 East Hennepin" building, was traced to some of the residents having kept the fire doors open because of summer heat.
- Born: Konstantin Yeryomenko, Russian pivot man and prolific goal scorer in the sport of futsal; in Dnipropetrovsk, Ukrainian SSR, Soviet Union (d. 2010)

== August 6, 1970 (Thursday) ==
- All 26 occupants and 4 crew of Pakistan International Airlines Flight 625 were killed when the Fokker F27 Friendship plane crashed six minutes after taking off from Rawalpindi during a severe thunderstorm with a scheduled destination of Lahore. The aircraft wreckage was found near the town of Rawat about 14 miles (23 km) southeast of Rawalpindi. A PIA spokesman said that the turboprop airplane had probably been hit by lightning and that it exploded and then disintegrated in midair.
- A bill to create the independent United States Postal Service (USPS), and to abolish the existing United States Post Office Department, passed Congress after being approved by the U.S. House of Representatives, 339 to 29. The bill, proposed by U.S. President Nixon, had passed the U.S. Senate earlier and marked "the most sweeping reform in the postal system's 181-year history" in the United States. The U.S. Senate had voted, 57 to 7, to approve the bill on August 3 President Nixon signed the bill on August 12, authorizing the transfer of functions to the USPS effective July 1, 1971.
- Born: M. Night Shyamalan (Manoj Nelliyattu Shyamalan), Indian-born horror film producer and director; in Mahé, Puducherry union territory

== August 7, 1970 (Friday) ==
- In San Rafael, California, Harold Haley, a Superior Court Judge for Marin County, was taken hostage during the criminal trial of a member of the Black Panthers, James D. McClain. Jonathan P. Jackson, the teenage nephew of George Jackson, had smuggled a pistol and a carbine rifle into the courtroom, then tossed the weapon to McClain, who then pressed the rifle against Judge Haley's neck in order to guarantee that the weapon would discharge if anyone attempted to stop the escape. Taking assistant prosecutor Gary W. Thomas and three women jurors as additional hostages, McClain, Jackson, and convict witnesses William Christmas and Ruchell Magee climbed into a rented van and Jackson began to drive to the parking lot exit, where they were met by a blockade by 100 law enforcement officers. McClain died in the shootout, which also killed Jackson and Christmas. Prosecutor Thomas said that nobody had been injured until McClain encountered the blockade and immediately turned around and shot Judge Haley with the sawed off shotgun. Thomas said also that he then grabbed a pistol from the van driver and shot McClain, Christmas and Jackson, at which point police opened fire, wounding Thomas and delivering fatal wounds to the three convicts.
- Claude L. Fly, an American agricultural adviser to the government of Uruguay, was kidnapped in Montevideo by the Tupamaro terrorists who had taken Dan Mitrione hostage on July 30. Fly would be held captive by the Tupamaros until 1971.

== August 8, 1970 (Saturday) ==
- A ceasefire between Egypt and Israel, brokered by U.S. Secretary of State William P. Rogers, took effect at one minute after midnight local time (Friday 22:01 UTC), with no fighting in an area 50 kilometres (31 mi) wide on each side of the Suez Canal.

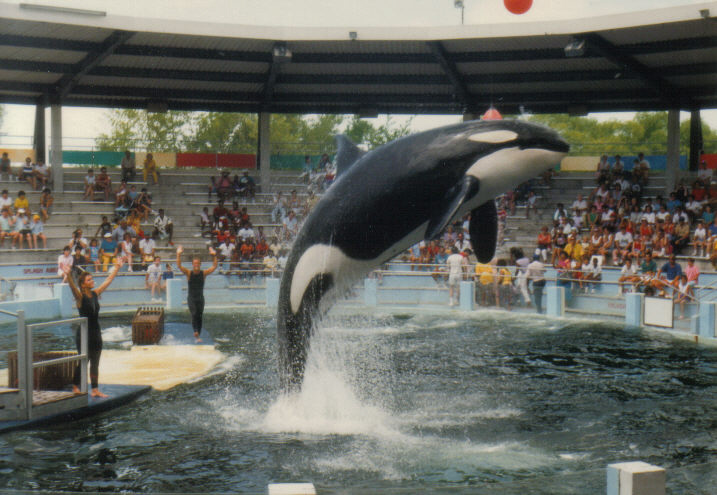
Lolita performing in 1998 after 28 years in captivity

- Lolita, a female orca whale, was caught in Puget Sound off the U.S. state of Washington and sold to the Miami Seaquarium in Florida to serve as the mate for Hugo, a male orca. Estimated at four years old in 1970, Lolita spent 53 years in captivity before dying in 2023.

== August 9, 1970 (Sunday) ==
- All but one of the 100 people on LANSA Flight 502 were killed when the Peruvian L-188A Electra plane crashed shortly after taking off from Cuzco on a return trip to Lima. Two farmers on the ground were killed when the Electra came down on top of them. Most of the dead were American exchange students who were returning to Lima from a tour of Macchu Pichu.
- A head-on collision between two trains killed 33 people and injured at least 136 south of the resort town of Plentzia in Spain's Basque region A southbound train had pulled out from Plentzia with vacationing families and weekend visitors from the seaside of the Bay of Biscay and returning to Bilbao. Employees of the railway station at Urduliz had signalled for an empty train to depart the station on a northbound trip to pick up more passengers from Plentzia.
- The government of Turkey devalued the worth of the Turkish lira by 40 percent, after the International Monetary Fund (IMF) had made the step a condition of a one billion dollar IMF credit. One hundred Turkish lira, formerly worth US$11.11, was reduced to a worth of US$6.67 as the exchange rate changed from 9 lira for a dollar to 15 lira, an amount higher than the black market rate. The 40% decrease was the largest in one day required by the IMF; Iceland's currency was devalued by 24.6% in 1967 and again by 35.2% on November 12, 1968
- Qaboos bin Said, who had deposed his father Said bin Taimur on July 23 from the throne of Muscat and Oman, informed his subjects in a radio broadcast that the nation would henceforward be known simply as "Oman". The Sultan also announced also that his uncle, Tariq bin Taimur, was the nation's new prime minister
- Born:
  - Chris Cuomo, American journalist and political commentator for CNN; in New York City to then-lawyer Mario Cuomo
  - Thomas Lennon, American comedian and TV actor; in Oak Park, Illinois

== August 10, 1970 (Monday) ==
- A proposed Equal Rights Amendment to the U.S. Constitution was overwhelmingly approved in the House of Representatives by a vote of 350 to 15, after having been introduced every year since 1923. Although a similar measure would be approved in the U.S. Senate, the session of the 91st United States Congress would expire five months later before the two houses of Congress could agree on a form to be submitted to the 50 States for ratification.
- The 232 prisoners housed on the ninth floor of the overcrowded Manhattan House of Detention, colloquially known as "The Tombs, took five guards hostage at daybreak and demanded a reforms meeting with Mayor John V. Lindsay At the time, the facility had a maximum capacity of 932 men for its small cells, and had almost 3,000 detained in filthy conditions, many of whom had been awaiting a court date for months. The prisoners released their hostages, unharmed, after a pledge from the city that they would not be prosecuted for the takeover, and the overcrowding would be eased by the transfer of inmates to other prisons in the state
- Died:
  - Dan Mitrione, 50, U.S. envoy to Uruguay who had been kidnapped on July 31, was shot and killed by his captors a few hours after a midnight deadline passed. A witness in Montevideo heard two gunshots at 4:30 in the morning, and police found Mitrione's body inside a stolen car a few minutes later
  - Joe Lapchick, 70, pioneering professional basketball player and coach, inductee into the Naismith Basketball Hall of Fame
  - Bernd Alois Zimmermann, 52, German operatic composer known for Die Soldaten, by suicide

== August 11, 1970 (Tuesday) ==
- At the predominantly Roman Catholic village of Crossmaglen in Protestant County Armagh, two police officers of the Royal Ulster Constabulary, became the first victims of the Irish Republican Army's announced campaign to target UK law enforcement officers in Northern Ireland Constables Bob Millar, 26, and Sam Donaldson, 23, were fatally injured when they stopped to investigate a small Ford Cortina automobile that had been abandoned on Crossmaglen's Lisseraw Road. When one of them lifted the hood (bonnet) of the car, 15 pounds (6.8 kg) of gelignite detonated. Millar and Donaldson both died the next day. In all 301 members of the RUC would be killed until the campaign ceased in 1998.
- Former heavyweight boxing champion Muhammad Ali was granted a license to box for the first time since being stripped of his title in 1967. After the lobbying of Georgia state senator Leroy Johnson, the aldermen of the city of Atlanta agreed to let Johnson's venture, House of Sports, lease the Atlanta City Auditorium for an October 26 bout; Georgia Governor Lester Maddox, who had previously said that he would not approve any match involving Ali, concluded that the state government had no authority to stop a boxing bout. At the time, Ali's conviction for draft evasion was still on appeal and awaiting a hearing before the U.S. Supreme Court. Although then-heavyweight champion Joe Frazier declined to appear, Ali's return to boxing would take place as scheduled against popular heavyweight Jerry Quarry.
- Father Daniel Berrigan, a Jesuit Roman Catholic priest and fugitive antiwar activist, was arrested by the FBI at a summer home in Block Island, Rhode Island On May 17, 1968, Berrigan and his brother, Philip, had destroyed draft board files in Catonsville, Maryland. Daniel Berrigan had been on the run since April 9, when he fled after being sentenced to three years in prison. He would serve 18 months and would be released on February 24, 1972.
- Born: Daniella Perez, Brazilian telanovela actress, in Rio de Janeiro (murdered, 1992)

== August 12, 1970 (Wednesday) ==
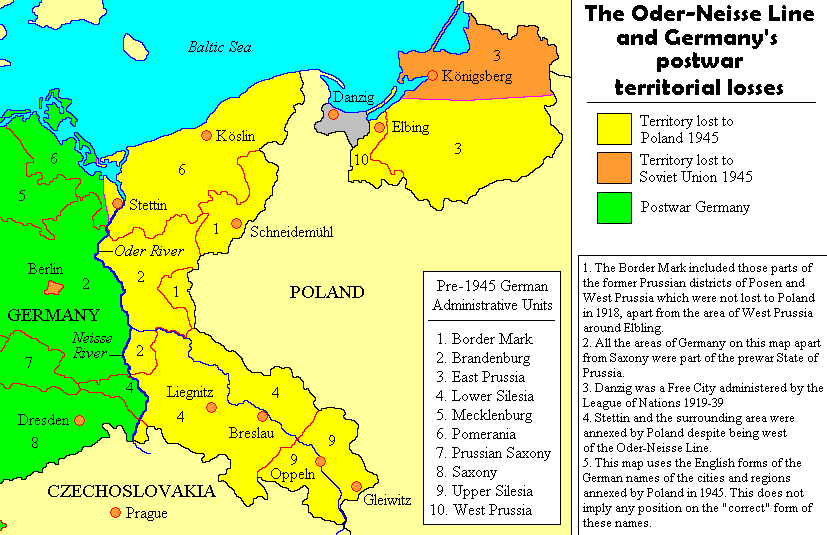
West Germany drops claims on former German territory east of the Oder and Neisse

- West Germany and the Soviet Union signed a nonaggression pact that relinquished further claims of former German territory east of the Oder–Neisse line. East Germany had previously agreed that most of the former German territories of Pomerania, Brandenburg, Silesia, Danzig and East Prussia were ceded to Poland, with the exception of the a portion of East Prussia ceded to the Soviet Union. West Germany, however, did not agree to recognition of East Germany as a separate nation. The ceremony took place in Moscow, with Chancellor Willy Brandt and Foreign Minister Walter Scheel signing for West Germany.
- The independent United States Postal Service (USPS) was created, and the existing United States Post Office Department was set to be phased out, as U.S. President Nixon signed the postal reform bill into law. The measure had been sent to Nixon on August 5, and had an effective date of July 1, 1971.
- Fourteen people were killed in the crash of China Airlines Flight 206 as it was approaching Taipei at the end of its flight from Hualien. The YS-11 plane flew into Yuan Mountain while making its approach in a thick fog, crashing into a bamboo grove. There were 17 survivors.
- Two French soccer football teams, Stade Saint-Germain and Paris Football Club, completed their merger to begin play as Paris Saint-Germain F.C. (PSG), which would become one of the most successful professional teams in France. PSG won the Division 2 title in the 1970–71 season and was promoted to France's premier circuit, Ligue 1, where it has won eight titles and been the champion for five consecutive seasons, as well as 12 Coupe de France and eight Coupe de la Ligue championships.
- Singer Janis Joplin gave what would prove to be her final concert, appearing before 35,000 people at the Harvard University Stadium
- A volcano on Antarctica's Deception Island, one of the Shetland Islands, erupted for the final time during the century before becoming dormant again. Prior eruptions on December 4, 1967, and on February 21, 1969, destroyed research stations and had forced both Chile and Britain to abandon the island that they both claimed. The final eruption was detected by research stations on adjacent islands.
- Born: Alan Shearer, England football soccer striker and national team player; in Gosforth, Newcastle upon Tyne

== August 13, 1970 (Thursday) ==
- Massachusetts became the first state in the United States to enact no-fault insurance in motor-vehicle accidents. Ignoring threats of ceasing business in the state by its four insurance companies, Governor Francis W. Sargent signed the bill at 8:10 in the evening during a televised news conference in Boston, providing for the law to become effective on January 1, 1971 Under the scheme, now universal in the U.S., a person's own insurance would pay for the initial medical expenses and damages for lost work for an injured person up to a limit (initially US$2,000) and the carrier would then seek recovery from the insurance carrier of the driver at fault, if there was another vehicle involved. Puerto Rico had enacted a no-fault plan in 1969

== August 14, 1970 (Friday) ==
- All diet foods and drinks with sodium cyclamate as an artificial sweetener were banned in the United States. The United States Food and Drug Administration gave retailers 18 days to sell or remove their remaining stock of the cyclamate-sweetened diet products by September 1. The compounds, commercially referred to as "cyclamates" or "Sucaryl", had been found, in 1969, to cause cancer in laboratory tests on animals. Extrapolating the data to human beings, a scientific study had concluded that consuming more than 168 mg of cyclamates per day was hazardous. Bottles and cans of Cyclamate-sweeted diet soft drinks had been banned since January 1, but the sweeteners were still used in powdered mixes for lemonade, fruit drinks and iced tea

== August 15, 1970 (Saturday) ==
- The 1970–1971 professional soccer football season opened for The Football League's four divisions and 92 teams in England. The new season featured three innovations in the form of corporate-sponsored promotional events, with the preseason Watney Mann Invitation Cup (an eight team playoff between the top goal scoring teams in each of the divisions); the Texaco Cup (an 18-team competition among First Division teams in the UK's four leagues, with six English playing six Scottish teams and two Northern Irish playing two Welsh teams in the opening round), and the Ford Sporting League, which was a prize given monthly to a team under a scoring system that awarded points for goals scored and subtracted points for players being penalized.
- Pakistan's President Yahya Khan announced that promised democratic elections for the 300-seat assembly to write a new constitution, which had been scheduled for October 5, would be postponed until December because of the problems that expected flooding would cause for voter turnout in East Pakistan The first, and only direct "one-man, one-vote" elections for East Pakistan and West Pakistan would take place on December 7, leading to a crisis that would lead to East Pakistan's secession from the western part of the nation to create Bangladesh.
- After being convicted of 12 counts of unpremeditated murder of civilians in the February 19 Son Thang massacre in South Vietnam, U.S. Marine Private First class Samuel G. Green was given a sentence of five years in prison following a court-martial that took place in Da Nang. As with his comrade, PFC Michael A. Schwarts (who was given a life sentence), Green would have his sentence commuted in December to one year in prison, with credit for time served.
- The Economic Stabilization Act of 1970 was signed into law by U.S. President Richard Nixon after being passed by Congress, and gave the American president authority to enact wage and price controls to combat inflation. The powers would be implemented a year later on August 15, 1971, with a 90-day freeze on increases of wages and prices.
- Born: Anthony Anderson, American comedian, TV actor and game show host; in Compton, California

== August 16, 1970 (Sunday) ==
- Bicyclist Jean-Pierre Monseré of Belgium won the gold medal in the 1970 UCI Road World Championships a few months before his death, becoming the recognized World Cycling Champion and winner of the rainbow jersey. The 21-year old star came in ahead of Leif Mortensen of Denmark in the competition at Mallory Park, a racing circuit at the English village of Kirkby Mallory in Leicestershire Seven months later, on March 15, 1971, Monseré would be struck by a car and killed while riding in another race.
- Born:
  - Saif Ali Khan, Indian film actor and producer, 2004 National Film Award winner; in New Delhi
  - Manisha Koirala, Nepali actress and Filmfare Award winner; in Kathmandu
  - Bonnie Bernstein, American sportscaster, in Brooklyn, New York City

== August 17, 1970 (Monday) ==
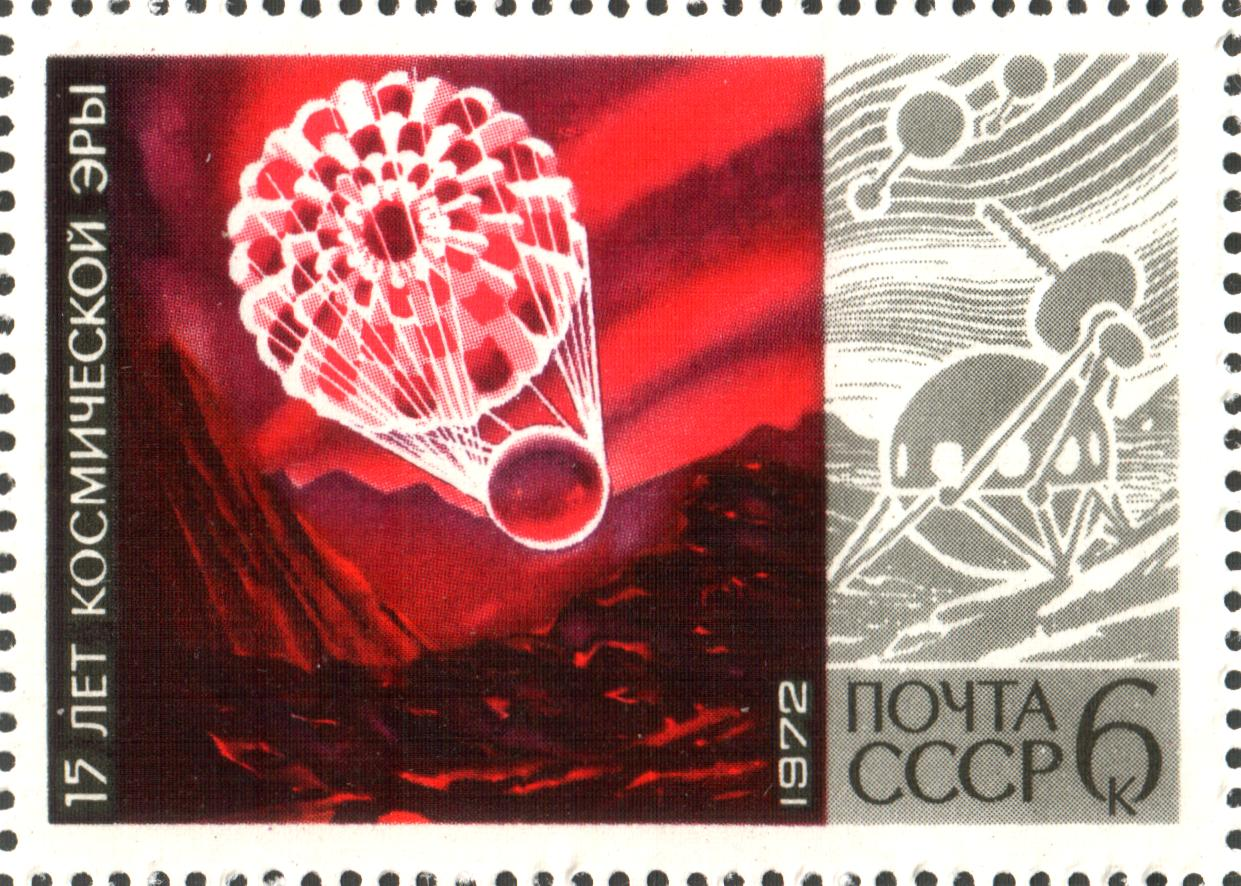
Venera 7 commemorative stamp

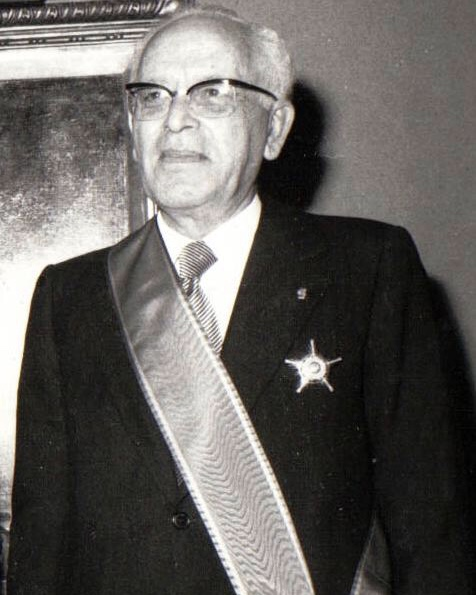
Franjieh

- A partial lunar eclipse was visible in Americas, Europe, Africa and Mid East, 131 minutes long lapse, and was the 49th eclipse of Lunar Saros 118.
- By a margin of one vote, Suleiman Franjieh was elected as the new President of Lebanon by the Lebanese Parliament. On the first ballot, no candidate received a 2/3rds majority of the 99 votes. Under Lebanon's constitution, a simple majority was required on subsequent balloting, and on the third ballot, Franjieh won, 50 to 49. At that point, the Speaker of the House, Sabri Hamadeh, ruled that 50—49 was non a majority and that a fourth ballot would be necessary. When deputy speaker Michel Sassine declared Franjieh the winner, Hamadeh repeated his demand for a fourth ballot, and Franjieh and Hamadeh then got into a fistfight. After conferring with other officials, Hamadeh then declared that Franjieh was now "the constitutional president of the republic".
- Venera 7 was launched toward Venus. On December 15, it would become the first spacecraft to successfully transmit data from the surface of another planet, sending a weak signal for 23 minutes.
- Born: Jim Courier, American professional tennis player ranked #1 in the world in 1992 and 1993; twice winner of the Australian Open and the French Open; in Orlando, Florida

== August 18, 1970 (Tuesday) ==
- The United States disposed of 418 containers of nerve gas by loading it onto the retired U.S. Navy ship SS LeBaron Russell Briggs, then sinking the ship in Atlantic Ocean waters 3 miles (4.8 km) deep at an American munitions dump 283 miles (455 km) east of Florida. The total cargo of the 418 drums was 12,540 rockets of Sarin (GB nerve gas) and a single canister of the more potent VX nerve gas.
- Voters in Lee County, Florida, approved the creation of the city of Cape Coral, twelve years after the area had started as a private land development. The vote was 2,067 in favor and to 1,798 against GAC Properties, Inc., had started buying land for resale in 1957 and owned 105 square miles (270 km^{2}) of Lee County, with 15,000 residents in its homes A city council would be elected in December, and would select Paul L. Flickinger as the city's first mayor
- Born: Malcolm-Jamal Warner, American TV actor best known as Theo Huxtable on The Cosby Show; in Jersey City, New Jersey
- Died: Soledad Miranda (stage name for Soledad Rendón Bueno), 27, Spanish film actress, was killed in an auto accident near Lisbon while working on her final film in Portugal, El diablo que vino de Akasawa ("The Devil Came from Akasava")

== August 19, 1970 (Wednesday) ==
- Britain's second Skynet communications satellite was launched from Cape Kennedy in the United States, following up on the November launch of the first Skynet. The intent was to park Skynet 1A in a geo-stationary orbit outpost over the Indian Ocean to aid communications from Britain to military outposts in Asia and Africa. Unfortunately, when the second Skynet was being raised toward its permanent site on August 22, its motor ceased firing halfway through its 27-second sequence and the satellite was lost.
- Acting for the first time on a warning given on July 10, the Internal Revenue Service of the U.S. revoked the tax-exempt status of 11 private schools that they would not drop their policy of racial discrimination. The 11 schools, all located in the state of Mississippi, had limited enrollment to white people only, in order to avoid racial integration required in public schools, but had been allowed the non-profit organization exemption from federal income taxes. Of 37 other southern private schools identified in July, two had closed, seven had filed declarations that they would not discriminate, and 28 more were told that they would either need to file a pledge or to be taxed. The schools included Rebel Academy in Learned, Mississippi; the Citizen Educational Foundation in Vicksburg; and the Jefferson Davis Academy in Meridian. By the beginning of the 1970–1971 school year, the U.S. Justice Department announced that 566 school districts in 11 southern states would have integrated classes for the first time.
- Ernest Ouandié, leader of the Union of the Peoples of Cameroon (UPC) who had fought for ten years against the colonial government of French Cameroon, and then against the government of President Ahmadou Ahidjo after Cameroon's independence, surrendered to local authorities in the city of Loum after months of hiding. Following a trial for treason in December, he would be executed by a firing squad on January 15, 1971.
- For the first time in the 170-year history of the presidential residence in Washington, DC, the American flag over the White House was flown at nighttime, rather than being lowered at sunset. The change in protocol occurred after U.S. First Lady Pat Nixon had learned that it was proper under flag etiquette to fly the banner after dark if it was illuminated by a spotlight, and would lead to a change in the display of the flag elsewhere in the United States.
- Born:
  - Hidayat Rustamov, Azerbaijani National Hero and one of the first people to be bestowed the distinction after Azerbaijan's independence from the Soviet Union; in Khidirly (now Xidirli), Azerbaijan
  - Fat Joe (stage name for Joseph Cartagena), American rap artist and actor; in The Bronx, New York City
- Died: Paweł Jasienica, (pen name for Leon Beynar), Polish dissident author and historian, from cancer

== August 20, 1970 (Thursday) ==
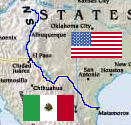
Nature of the shifting U.S./Mexican border

- Six sailors on the French Navy submarine Galatée were killed when their vessel collided with the South African Navy's recently commissioned submarine, the Maria van Riebeeck off the coast of France at Toulon. South Africa had purchased the sub from France on July 24, and the Riebeeck was sailing toward Toulon after sea trials, while Galatée was heading out to sea for naval exercises. Both vehicles were on the surface at the time; Galatée had a 40 ft (12 m) wide hole in its side following the collision. One of the French Navy's officers, identified as Lieutenant Lauga, ordered the ship to run aground on the reefs of Cape Cépet to prevent Galatée from sinking.
- At a hotel in Puerto Vallarta in Mexico, U.S. President Richard M. Nixon and Mexico's President Gustavo Díaz Ordaz met for three hours and agreed to terms for the Boundary Treaty of 1970. While maintaining the Rio Grande (known in Mexico as the Río Bravo del Norte) as the border between the U.S. state of Texas and the Mexican states of Chihuahua, Coahuila, Nuevo León, and Tamaulipas, the agreement recognized, for the first time, that the center of the river would always be the boundary, even if the river changed course; as one observer noted at the time, "Thus, according to the principles, when the river shifts its course... the boundary will shift with it." The river boundary runs from El Paso to Brownsville on the Texas side and from Ciudad Juarez to Matamoros on the Mexican side.
- The government of the Hungarian People's Republic held a simultaneous celebration of both Communism and Christianity with ceremonies honoring the millennium of the birth of Saint Istvan (the nation's patron saint) on his August 20 feast day, and the 21st anniversary of the August 20, 1949 founding of the people's republic. The year of Istvan's birth is unknown and has been speculated as being between 969 and 975.
- Born: Fred Durst, American singer and co-founder of Limp Bizkit rap rock group; in Gastonia, North Carolina
- Died: Jerry London, 41, Canadian professional wrestling former champion, committed suicide hours after losing a match in San Francisco.

== August 21, 1970 (Friday) ==
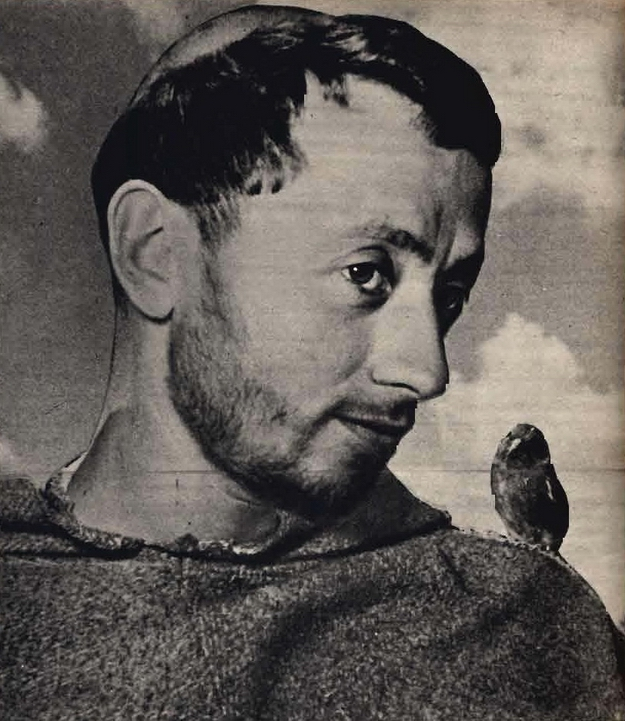
St. Francis

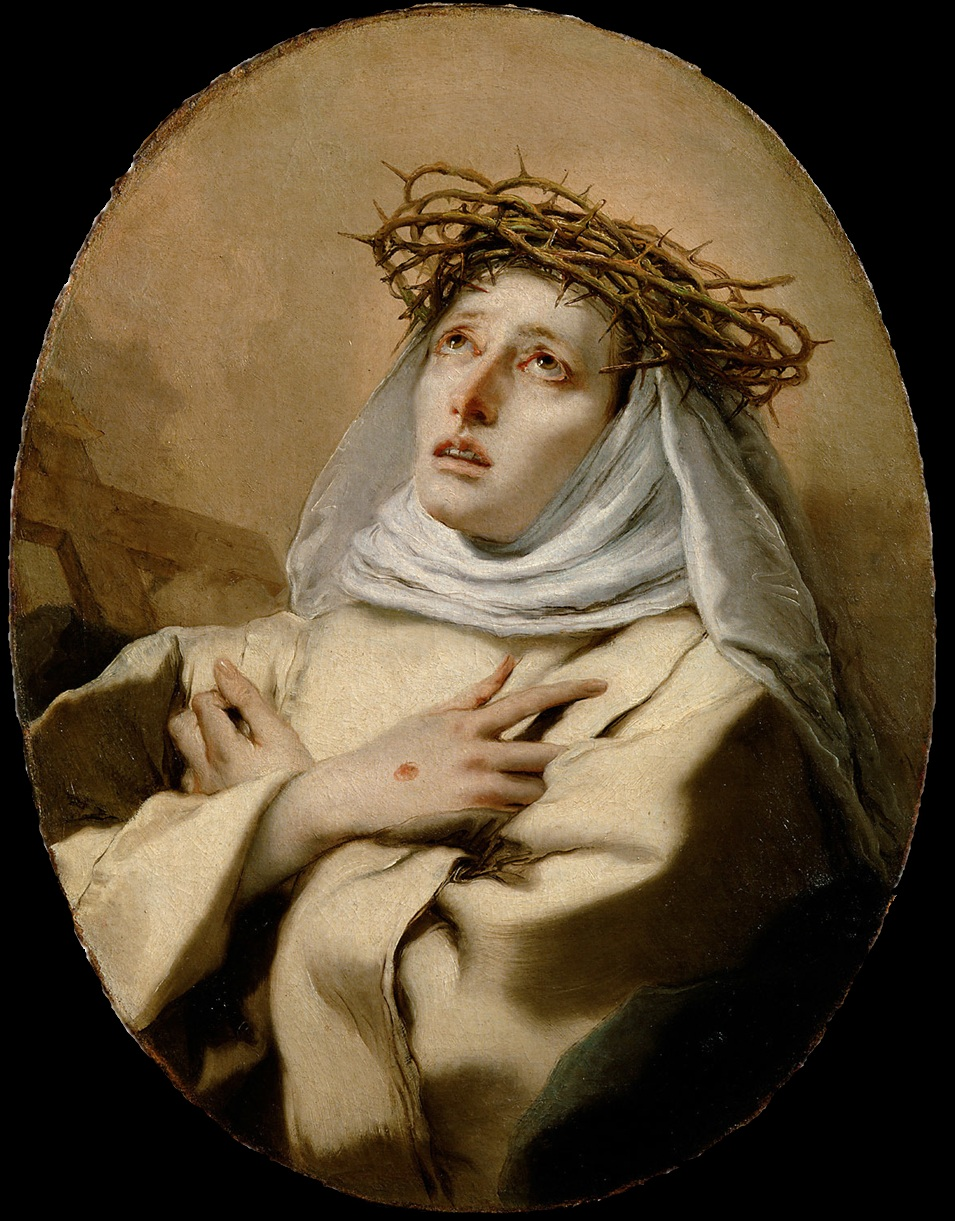
St. Catherine

- The Roman Catholic Church issued an edict declaring that only one patron saint would be allowed for any Catholic religious order, nation, province, city or village. The ruling was announced by the church's Congregation for Divine Worship in Rome. At the time, Italy had two patron saints, St. Francis of Assisi and St. Catherine of Siena. All affected groups would be allowed until 1976 to decide on their own which person would be their patron saint.

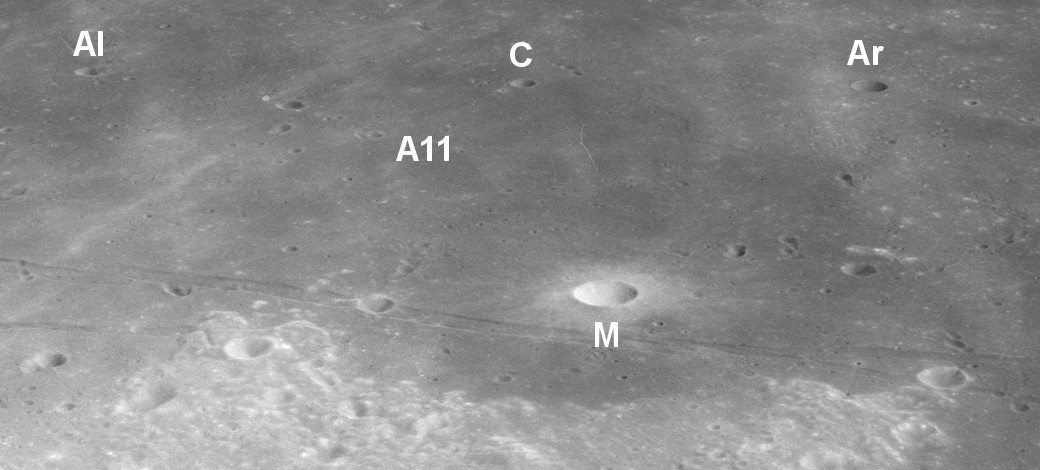
Craters Aldrin, Collins and Armstrong

- The International Astronomical Union announced the naming of 513 craters on the surface of the Moon and, for the first time, applied the honor to living persons. The list, distributed at the IAU general assembly in Brighton, East Sussex in England, included six American astronauts and seven Soviet cosmonauts. All but three of the craters were on the far side of the Moon and not visible from Earth. The exceptions were three impact craters north of Moltke crater, near the site of the Apollo 11 landing site within the Mare Tranquillitatis, named for Neil Armstrong, Buzz Aldrin and Michael Collins.
- British astronomer Zdenek Kopal of Manchester University announced that he had discovered the first example of an exoplanet, based on his finding of a disk of matter estimated at four billion miles (6.5 billion kilometers) in diameter surrounding Epsilon Aurigae, located more than 2,000 light years distant. Kopal would later conclude that the disk was a massive cloud of dust orbiting a companion star (or stars) in a binary system.

== August 22, 1970 (Saturday) ==
- Five days after sending Venera 7 toward a planned landing on the planet Venus, the Soviet Union launched Kosmos 359 into Earth orbit, with the statement that it was intended for "space research", not otherwise specified Speculation that 359 was a second probe to Venus would be confirmed by the Russian government after the 1991 breakup of the USSR. The fourth stage of the rocket "ignited later than planned" and ceased operating after 25 seconds, rather than the planned four minutes. Rather than sending what would have been "Venera 8" toward Venus, the rocket misfire stranded the satellite in an elliptical Earth orbit varying from 129 miles (208 km) to 553 miles (890 km), and the spacecraft re-entered the atmosphere on November 6
- North Korea rejected a proposal, raised by South Korea's President Park Chung Hee on August 15, to discuss reunification of the two nations. The statement came in a lengthy editorial in the North Korean Communist Party's official newspaper, Rodong Sinmun, and declared that the 64,000 U.S. troops in South Korea would have to be withdrawn before any negotiations could begin. North Korea also described President Park as "a faithful running dog of U.S. imperialist aggressors."
- Panama resumed control of a U.S. Army base at Rio Hato, after declining to renew a 15-year agreement to lease the property to the United States. The 29 sq mi (75 km^{2}) base, which was converted into a civilian airport, had served as the training site for the 193rd Infantry Brigade since 1962
- Born:
  - Ricco Gross, German biathlon world champion and Olympic gold medalist; in Bad Schlema, East Germany
  - Giada De Laurentiis, Italian-born American chef and TV personality; in Rome
- Died: Vladimir Propp, 75, Soviet folklorist and literary theorist

== August 23, 1970 (Sunday) ==
- Members of the United Farm Workers (UFW) in California voted to begin the largest strike of farm workers in U.S. history, as representatives of workers from 27 of the largest lettuce producing ranches met at a Hartnell College in Salinas, California and agreed to begin picketing, followed by a walkout the next day The walkout came less than a month after UFW leader Cesar Chavez had signed a contract with the major farm employers to permit a union, then found that the Teamsters were allowed to compete against the UFW in organizing workers. The walkout would last for seven months, finally ending on March 26 when the UFW and the Teamsters were able to reach an agreement granting the UFW jurisdiction over field workers.
- Lightning strikes in the U.S. state of Washington ignited 225 individual fires that soon merged into a major forest fire that burned 190 square miles (490 km^{2}) of the Wenatchee National Forest over a period of two weeks. Heavy rains extinguished the blaze in the Entiat Mountains, dubbed the "Entiat Fire", on September 7, after the involvement of 8,500 firefighters to prevent the conflagration from spreading further.
- Born:
  - River Phoenix, American TV and film actor; as River Jude Bottom in Madras, Oregon (died of drug overdose, 1993)
  - Jay Mohr, American TV and film actor and comedian; in Verona, New Jersey
- Died: Abdallah Khalil, 78, Prime Minister of Sudan from 1956 to 1958

== August 24, 1970 (Monday) ==
- One person was killed by a terrorist bomb detonated outside of a building on the campus of the University of Wisconsin in Madison, and four others were injured Sterling Hall, a four-story building used by the UW—Madison physics department and the U.S. Army Mathematics Research Center, was the target of a group that called itself "The New Year's Gang". The group stole a van and placed a cargo of 2,000 pounds (910 kg) of ammonium nitrate and fuel oil explosives inside, then parked in front of Sterling Hall at about 3:00 in the morning and set a timer. At 3:37 a.m., one of the plotters called the Madison Police Department and warned that a bomb was in the center and was set to go off in five minutes, and the city police called the university police one minute later; the bomb exploded at 3:42 Robert Fassnacht, a 33 year old physicist, was working late in the building when the bomb exploded and was killed instantly. Three of the four bombers would be arrested between 1972 and 1977 and would serve a few years in prison before being released, while a fourth, Leo Burt, was never located despite having been on the FBI Ten Most Wanted Fugitives for more than five years.
- Two Sikorsky MH-53 helicopters became the first copters to fly across the Pacific Ocean, arriving at the Misawa Air Base in Japan after flying nonstop from the Shemya Air Force Base in the westernmost of Alaska's Aleutian Islands, a distance of 1,700 miles (2,700 km). Each of the "Super Jolly Green Giant" helicopters carried a crew of six people. The flight took 14 hours and required four refuelings in midair along the journey

== August 25, 1970 (Tuesday) ==
- A pilot's quick thinking saved BOAC Flight 912 from a mid-air collision at 25,000 feet (7,600 m) with a group of U.S. Navy jets. The Boeing 707 was en route from Bangkok to Hong Kong with 114 passengers and a crew of 10 when it encountered the three warplanes over the South China Sea at the same altitude. Captain Stuart Robinson banked the BOAC jetliner sharp right, and dived 2,000 feet (610 m), to avoid the oncoming American aircraft. Fourteen people were injured, but evasive maneuver saved everyone from certain death, and the jet was able to make a safe landing in Hong Kong.
- The U.S. Senate overwhelmingly rejected a Republican proposal to make the United States military an all-volunteer service, a first step in eliminating the need for renewing the draft after its scheduled June 30 expiration. U.S. Senators Barry Goldwater and Mark Hatfield had sponsored the plan as an amendment to a funding procurement bill, but the measure failed with only 35 for and 52 against.
- A 7-year-old boy, Tang Kwok-hin, survived a fall from the ninth floor of an apartment building in Hong Kong, unharmed, after he had tumbled out of the window of his family's home. Tang's fall was broken when he landed on, then bounced off of, the canvas awning of a flower shop on the building's ground floor.
- Born:
  - Claudia Schiffer, German supermodel and fashion designer; in Rheinberg, Nordrein-Westfalen, West Germany
  - Yoshihiro Nakamura, Japanese film director, in the Ibaraki Prefecture
  - Jane Egan, British parathlete

== August 26, 1970 (Wednesday) ==
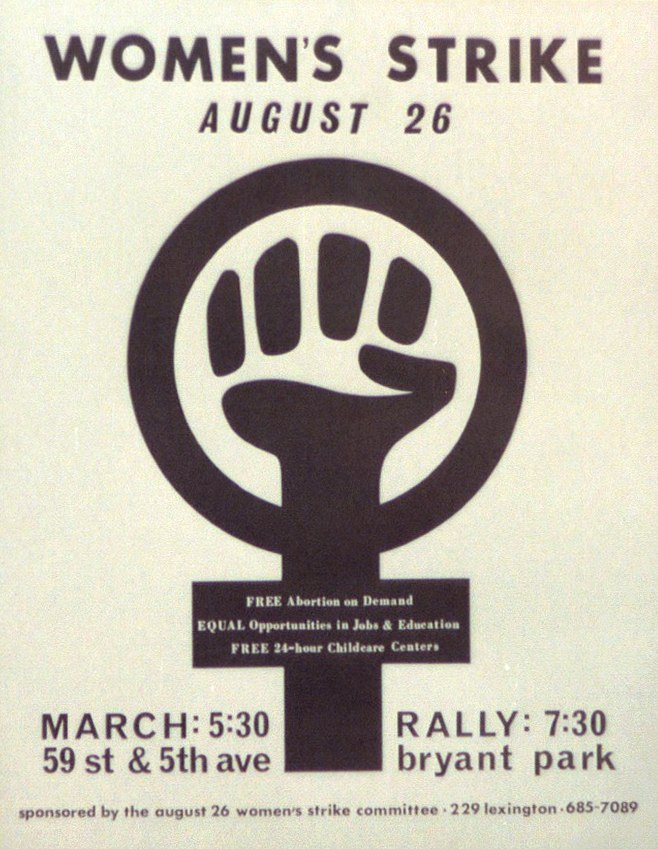

- The Women's Strike for Equality took place on Fifth Avenue in New York City, with an estimated 25,000 marchers demonstrating in favor of equal pay for equal jobs. The march had been organized by Betty Friedan of the National Organization for Women. Leading the parade was a car "carrying several elderly women who fought for female suffrage" 50 years earlier, and was timed to coincide with the anniversary of the August 26, 1920, adoption of the Nineteenth Amendment to the United States Constitution that granted women the right to vote nationwide. Similar events took place with 5,000 marchers in Boston, 3,000 in Chicago, and less than 500 in Los Angeles
- In one of the worst U.S. aircraft losses in the Vietnam War, 32 U.S. servicemen were killed when a rocket-propelled grenade struck a U.S. Army CH-47 Chinook helicopter as the transport was preparing to land at Firebase Judy in South Vietnam's Quang Nam Province. The Chinook was carrying 25 American troops, and debris struck seven others on the ground.
- The Isle of Wight Festival began on East Afton Farm on England's Isle of Wight. Admission to the largest pop music festival in British history cost £3 (US$7.20) and featured 45 performing artists and started with about 50,000 fans, with concerts taking place on Friday, Saturday and Sunday.
- Born:
  - Melissa McCarthy, American comedian, TV and film actress, two-time Emmy Award winner; in Plainfield, Illinois
  - Olimpiada Ivanova, Russian race walker, and 2001 and 2005 world champion; in Tsivilsk, Chuvash ASSR, Soviet Union

== August 27, 1970 (Thursday) ==
- Albert Ndongmo, the Roman Catholic Bishop of Nkongsamba in Cameroon, voluntarily returned from exile in Rome, in order to face charges that he had conspired with rebels to assassinate President Ahmadou Ahidjo He was arrested upon his arrival in Yaounde, and would be tried and convicted of treason by a military tribunal on January 5, 1971. After originally being sentenced to execution, Ndongomo would have his sentence commuted to life imprisonment and would finally be released by Ahidjo in 1975.
- Born:
  - Peter Ebdon, English snooker player and 2002 world champion; in Islington, London
  - Jim Thome, American major league baseball player who hit 612 home runs in 22 seasons for six teams; in Peoria, Illinois
  - Karl Unterkircher, Italian mountaineer, in Sëlva, South Tyrol (killed in a fall, 2008)
  - Pokwang (stage name for Marietta Subong), Philippine comedian and singer; in Iloilo City, Panay island
- Died: José Alonso, 53, former leader of Argentina's CGT labor union, was shot and killed by militants a little more than a year after his predecessor, Augusto Vandor, had been killed by a car bomb on June 30, 1969.

== August 28, 1970 (Friday) ==
- The United States made the first successful test of its multi-billion dollar Safeguard Program equipment, with the Missile Site Radar (MSR) near Nekoma, North Dakota guiding an anti-ballistic missile fired from the South Pacific Ocean, after detecting an intercontinental ballistic missile (ICBM) launched from California. The Pentagon announced three days later that an unarmed Minuteman missile had been launched into outer space from Vandenberg Air Force Base and that the radar detected the trajectory of the rocket with enough precision to launch a Spartan missile from Kwajalein Atoll in the Marshall Islands, 4,200 miles (6,800 km) distant. The intercept took place when the unarmed Spartan was guided to a point close enough to the incoming Minuteman that, if the Spartan had been armed with a five megaton nuclear warhead, the Minuteman would have been destroyed before it could reach its target.
- Born: Bappaditya Bandopadhyay, Indian film director; in Calcutta (now Kolkata) (d. 2015)

== August 29, 1970 (Saturday) ==
- The McDonnell Douglas DC-10, a "jumbo jet" to rival the Boeing 747, made its first flight. A crew of four, led by pilot Clifford Stout, were on board when the tri-jet DC-10 took off from the airport at Long Beach, California at 10:00 in the morning and flew for several hours before landing at 1:26 at Edwards Air Force Base. Designed to produce less noise than most aircraft, and with room to seat 345 passengers, the aircraft would go into service on August 5, 1971.
- The Chicano Moratorium against the Vietnam War, began in East Los Angeles. A parade through the streets quickly became violent and three days of rioting followed, spreading into South Los Angeles and into Wilmington, California. Journalist Rubén Salazar, a columnist for the Los Angeles Times and news director for the KMEX-TV station, was found dead inside a cafe, the victim of a "high-velocity tear-gas shell" that had been fired into the Silver Dollar Cafe by a Los Angeles County sheriff's deputy.
- All 34 passengers and five crew on an Indian Airlines flight were killed when the Fokker F-27 crashed into a hillside, a few minutes after taking off from Kumbhigram Airport in Silchar toward Borjhar Airport in Guwahati. The plane was on a multi-stop flight from Imphal to Calcutta The wreckage was spotted by helicopter after two days of searching, on the 5,035 ft (1,535 m) high Kaukaho mountain peak in the Borail range, above the village of Jatinga-Khasia
- Born: Alessandra Negrini, Brazilian actress; in São Paulo

== August 30, 1970 (Sunday) ==
- The third, and last, annual Isle of Wight Festival ended after three days of rock, pop and jazz performances before a crowd that reached 250,000 people, most of whom were able to get in without paying or who watched from a hillside. Headlined by Joan Baez, the list of stars included Jimi Hendrix (in one of his last appearances), The Who, Joni Mitchell, The Doors, Emerson, Lake & Palmer, The Moody Blues, Chicago, Jethro Tull, Miles Davis, Tiny Tim and Leonard Cohen. The festival took place near Freshwater on Britain's Isle of Wight and was marked by drug arrests, minor riots, and financial losses for the producers, Fiery Creations, Ltd.
- National elections were held in South Vietnam for the first time since 1967, and two-thirds of the eligible voters participated despite random attacks on polling places by the Viet Cong and by North Vietnam forces. The polling was for 30 of the 60 seats in the Senate of South Vietnam, in a format with 30 seats to be filled by choosing the top three of 16 tickets (with 10 candidates apiece). At least 11 voters were killed, most of them in the Binh Dinh province.
- Soviet astronomer Tamara Smirnova discovered three asteroids on the same evening at the Crimean Astrophysical Observatory – Shura, Veteraniya and Gerasimovich. In a career that spanned 16 years, she discovered 135 minor planets, including 5540 Smirnova, named in her honor by the IAU.
- Died: Abraham Zapruder, 65, Russian Ukrainian-born American clothing manufacturer whose home movie of President Kennedy's motorcade through Dallas became the key record of the assassination of the president.

== August 31, 1970 (Monday) ==
- An annular solar eclipse was visible in Papua New Guinea and the Pacific Ocean, and was the 14th solar eclipse of Solar Saros 144.
- Edward Akufo-Addo was elected as the President of Ghana after four years of military rule in the West African nation. Akufo-Addo, the former Chief Justice of Ghana's Supreme Court, was selected by secret ballot by a 164-member special electoral college consisting of the 140 members of the Parliament of Ghana and 24 tribal chiefs, and received 123 votes against the 35 for challenger Isaac Asafu Adjaye.
- Born:
  - Debbie Gibson, American singer and record producer; in Brooklyn
  - Zack Ward, Canadian character actor; in Toronto
  - Queen Rania of Jordan, queen consort of Jordan since the 1999 coronation of King Abdullah; in Kuwait City
