= L100 =

L100 may refer to:

- L 100, a Belgian resistance organisation
- Albatros L 100, light aircraft built in Germany
- Hammond L-100, an electric organ series
- HMAS Choules (L 100), a Bay-class landing ship with the Royal Fleet Auxiliary (RFA)
- HMS Liddesdale (L100), Type II Hunt-class destroyer of the Royal Navy
- JBL L-100, a model of musical loudspeaker
- Landsverk L-100, Swedish prototype tank in development during World War II
- Lockheed L-100 Hercules, the civilian variant of the prolific C-130 military transport aircraft
- Mitsubishi L100, a kei truck model
- Nikon Coolpix L100, a semi-compact, digital camera
- Saturn L100, a sedan made by Saturn Corporation in Wilmington, Delaware
- Strv L-100, a prototype light tank design by Landsverk in 1933–34

== See also ==
- Lunar 100 list of the Moon's most interesting regions to observe.
