= Schmidt (lunar crater) =

Crater on the Moon

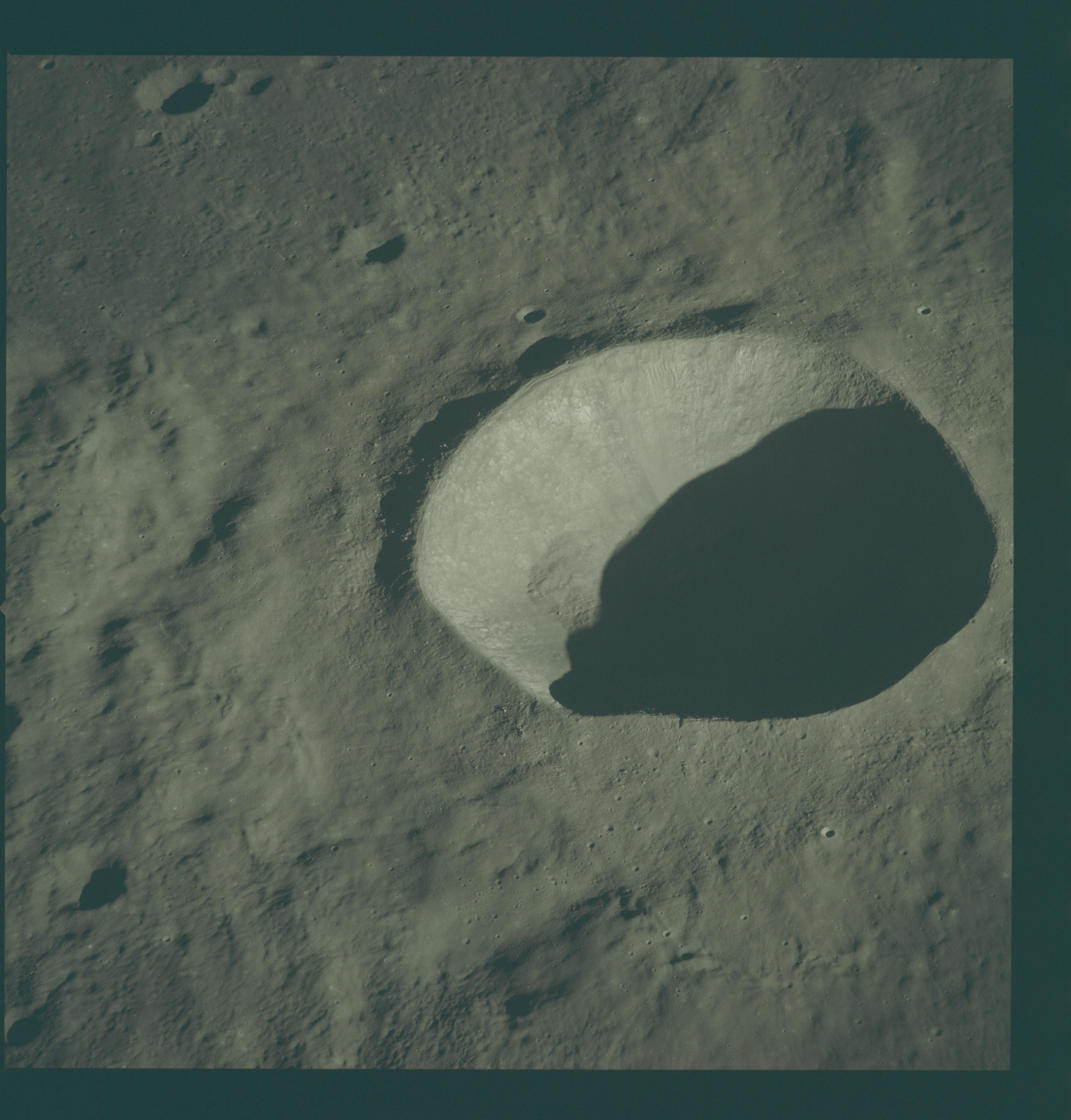
- Schmidt from Apollo 10. NASA photo.
- Coordinates: 1.0°N 18.8°E
- Diameter: 11 km (6.8 mi)
- Depth: 2.3 km (1.4 mi)
- Colongitude: 341° at sunrise
- Eponym: Johann F. J. Schmidt; Bernhard Schmidt; Otto Y. Schmidt

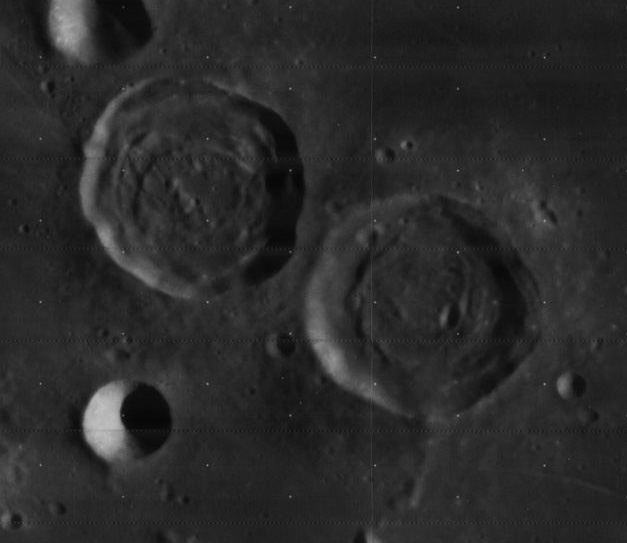
Lunar Orbiter 4 image of Sabine (right of center), Ritter (left of center), and Schmidt (lower left) craters

Schmidt is a small lunar impact crater that is located near the southwest edge of Mare Tranquillitatis, to the southwest of the Ritter–Sabine crater pair. It was named after German astronomer Johann Friedrich Julius Schmidt, German optician Bernhard Schmidt and Soviet astronomer Otto Schmidt. This formation is circular and bowl-shaped, with little appearance of wear due to subsequent impacts. The interior has a higher albedo than the surrounding terrain, giving it a light appearance. The exterior consists of hummocky terrain with many boulders, ranging up to 100 m or more in diameter.
