= Aldrin (crater) =

Crater on the Moon

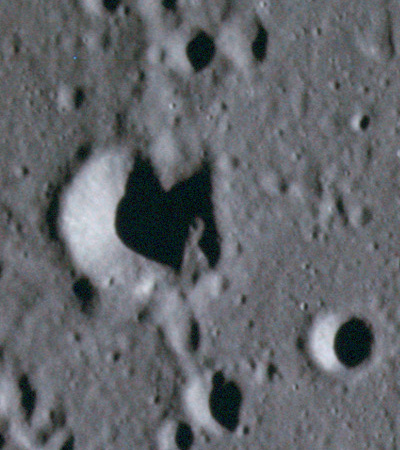
- Apollo 11 image
- Coordinates: 1.4°N 22.1°E
- Diameter: 3.4 km (2.1 mi)
- Depth: 0.6 km (0.37 mi)
- Colongitude: 338° at sunrise
- Eponym: Edwin Buzz Aldrin

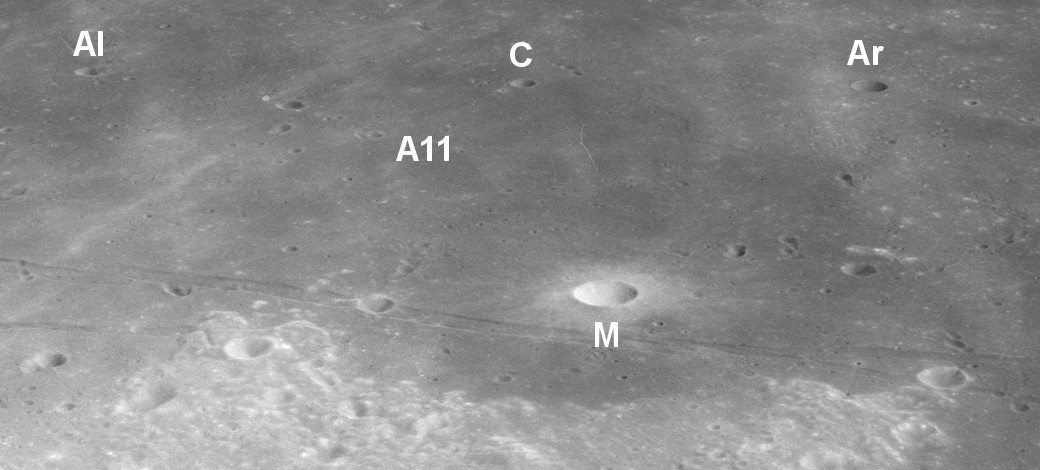
Annotated oblique view from Apollo 16 showing the vicinity of the Apollo 11 landing site (A11) with the craters Aldrin (Al), Collins (C), Armstrong (Ar), and Moltke (M), facing north.

Aldrin is a small impact crater located on the southern part of the Mare Tranquillitatis, to the east of Sabine. It is located about 50 kilometers to the northwest of the Apollo 11 landing site, Tranquility Base. Named after Edwin Buzz Aldrin, the crater is the westernmost of a row of three craters named in honor of the Apollo 11 crew members. Their designations were formally adopted by the International Astronomical Union in 1970. About 30 kilometers to the east is the landing site of the Surveyor 5 lunar probe.

This crater was previously identified as Sabine B before being named by the IAU. Sabine itself is to the west of Aldrin.

== See also ==
- 6470 Aldrin
- Armstrong (crater)
- Collins (crater)
