= Manners (crater) =

Crater on the Moon

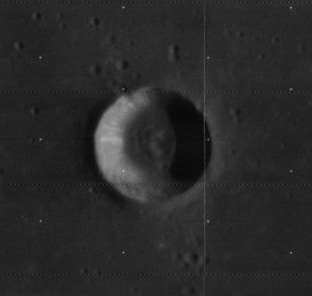
- Lunar Orbiter 4 image
- Coordinates: 4.6°N 20.0°E
- Diameter: 15.05 km (9.35 mi)
- Depth: 1.90 km (1.18 mi)
- Colongitude: 340° at sunrise
- Eponym: Russell H. Manners

Manners is a lunar impact crater located in the western part of the Mare Tranquillitatis. It has a diameter is 15 km and a depth of 1.9 km. To the northeast is the larger crater Arago and to the south are Ritter and Sabine. The crater has a rim with a higher albedo than the surrounding mare, making it appear bright. This is a circular, bowl-shaped feature with a raised rim and a relatively flat interior.

This crater was named after British astronomer Russell Henry Manners (1800-1870). Its designation was formally adopted by the International Astronomical Union in 1935.

== Satellite craters ==
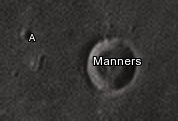
Manners crater and its satellite crater Manners A taken from Earth in 2012 at the University of Hertfordshire's Bayfordbury Observatory with the telescopes Meade LX200 14" and Lumenera Skynyx 2-1

By convention these features are identified and realised on lunar maps by placing the letter on the side of the crater midpoint that is closest to Manners.

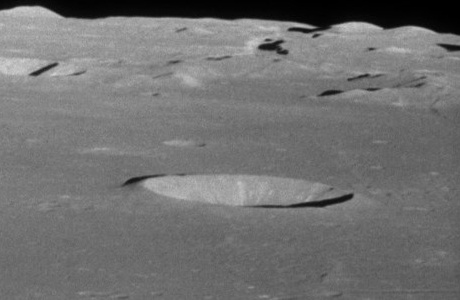
Oblique view from Apollo 11

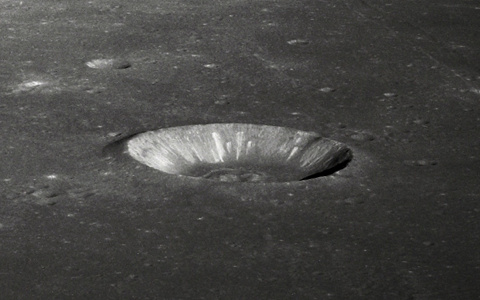
Oblique view from Apollo 10

Manners	Latitude	Longitude	Diameter
A	4.6° N	19.1° E	3 km
