= 6469 Armstrong =

Main-belt asteroid

Discovery
- Discovered by: A. Mrkos
- Discovery site: Kleť Obs.
- Discovery date: 14 August 1982

Designations
- Named after: Neil Armstrong (astronaut, Apollo 11)
- Alternative designations: 1982 PC · 1969 UK_{1} 1972 NN · 1979 WZ_{6} 1982 QL
- Minor planet category: main-belt · Flora

Orbital characteristics
- Epoch 4 September 2017 (JD 2458000.5)
- Uncertainty parameter 0
- Observation arc: 47.45 yr (17,332 days)
- Aphelion: 2.6725 AU
- Perihelion: 1.7663 AU
- Semi-major axis: 2.2194 AU
- Eccentricity: 0.2041
- Orbital period (sidereal): 3.31 yr (1,208 days)
- Mean anomaly: 226.43°
- Mean motion: 0° 17^{m} 53.16^{s} / day
- Inclination: 3.9595°
- Longitude of ascending node: 159.41°
- Argument of perihelion: 150.61°

Physical characteristics
- Dimensions: 2.89 km (calculated); 3.720±0.392 km
- Synodic rotation period: 5.9648±0.1423 h 6.040±0.040 h
- Geometric albedo: 0.24 (assumed); 0.243±0.039
- Spectral type: S
- Absolute magnitude (H): 14.5 · 14.340±0.250 (R) · 14.3 · 14.416±0.007 (R) · 14.87

6469 Armstrong, provisional designation 1982 PC, is a stony Flora asteroid from the inner regions of the asteroid belt, approximately 3 kilometers in diameter. It was discovered by Czech astronomer Antonín Mrkos at Kleť Observatory on 14 August 1982. The asteroid was later named for American astronaut Neil Armstrong.

== Orbit and classification ==
Armstrong is a member of the Flora family, one of the largest groups of stony asteroids in the main-belt. It orbits the Sun in the inner main-belt at a distance of 1.8–2.7 AU once every 3 years and 4 months (1,208 days). Its orbit has an eccentricity of 0.20 and an inclination of 4° with respect to the ecliptic.

In October 1969, it was first identified as 1969 UK_{1} at Crimea–Nauchnij. The body's observation arc began 10 years prior to its official discovery at Klet Observatory, with a precovery taken at Crimea–Nauchnij in July 1972.

== Physical characteristics ==
Armstrong is a presumed S-type asteroid.

=== Rotation period ===
Two rotational lightcurves of Armstrong were obtained from photometric observations made at the Palomar Transient Factory, California, in January and February 2014. The lightcurves gave a concurring rotation period of 6.040±0.040 and 5.9648±0.1423 hours with a brightness variation of 0.65 and 0.70 in magnitude, respectively (U=2/2).

=== Diameter and albedo ===
According to the survey carried out by the NEOWISE mission of NASA's space-based Wide-field Infrared Survey Explorer, Armstrong measures 3.7 kilometers in diameter and its surface has an albedo of 0.24.

The Collaborative Asteroid Lightcurve Link assumes an identical albedo of 0.24 – derived from 8 Flora, the largest member and namesake of its orbital family – and calculates a diameter of 2.9 kilometers, based on a weaker absolute magnitude of 14.87.

== Naming ==
This minor planet was named after American astronaut Neil Armstrong, on the occasion of the 30th anniversary of the Apollo 11 mission.

On 20 July 1969, Armstrong was one of the first two humans to land on the Moon, and the first person to walk on it, shortly followed by Buzz Aldrin, after whom the asteroid 6470 Aldrin is named. The minor planet 6471 Collins is named after Michael Collins, the third crew member of the Apollo 11 mission. In 1966, Armstrong also conducted the first docking in space together with David Scott aboard Gemini 8. The asteroid's name was suggested by Czech astronomers Jana Tichá, Miloš Tichý and Zdeněk Moravec, who observed it during its 1995-opposition, shortly before being numbered. The approved naming citation was published by the Minor Planet Center on 4 May 1999 (M.P.C. 34623).

The lunar crater Armstrong is also named in his honor.
