= Sabine (crater) =

Crater on the Moon

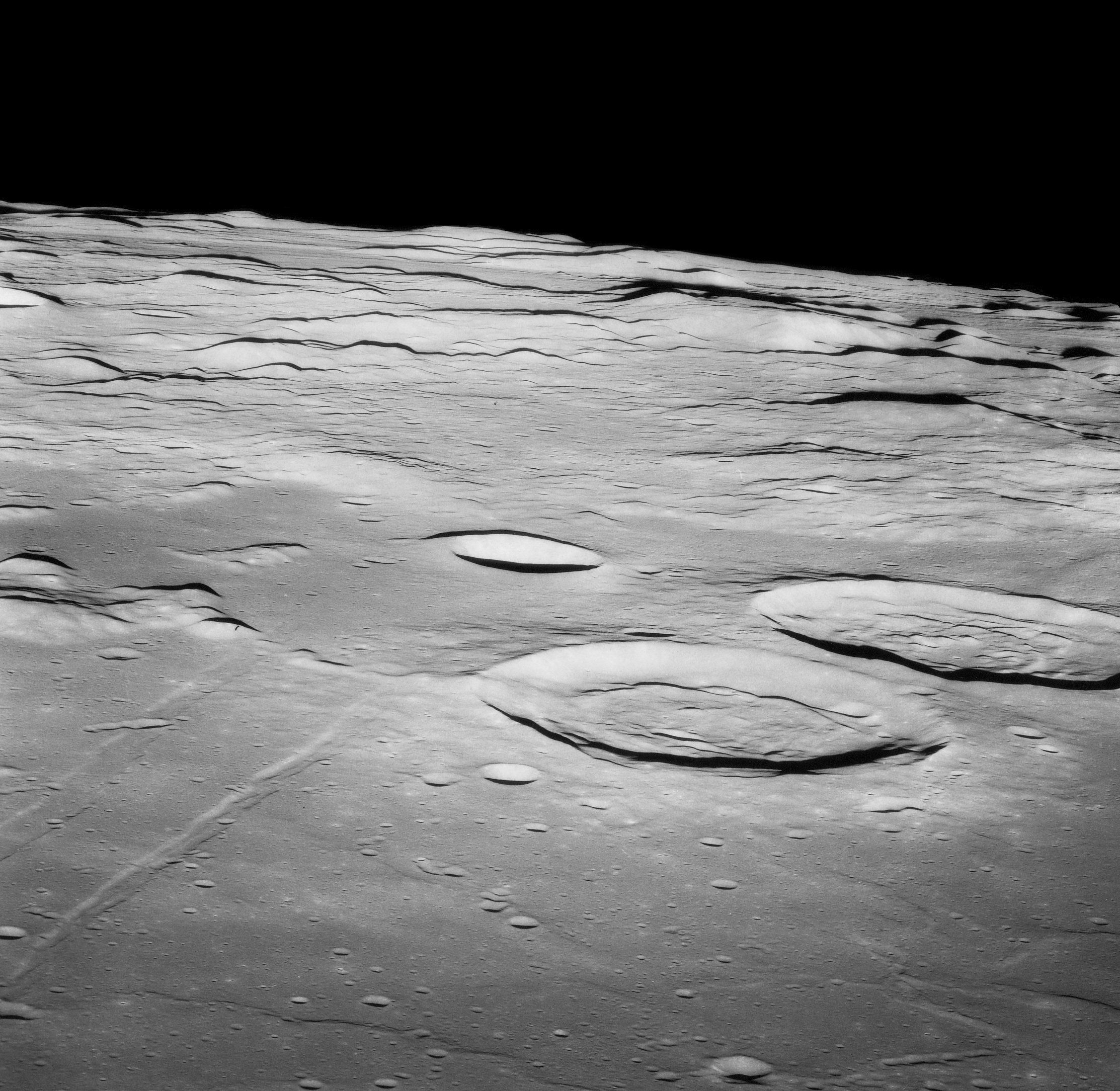
- Sabine (center right) and Ritter (right), from Apollo 11
- Coordinates: 1.4°N 20.1°E
- Diameter: 30 km (19 mi)
- Depth: 1.4 km (0.87 mi)
- Colongitude: 340° at sunrise
- Eponym: Edward Sabine

Sabine (/ˈseɪbɪn/ SAY-bin) is a lunar impact crater that forms a nearly matching pair with Ritter to the northwest. The two rims are separated by a distance of only a couple of kilometers. To the west is the bowl-shaped crater Schmidt, and farther to the north are Manners and Arago. Its diameter is 30 km. It was named after Irish physicist and astronomer Edward Sabine.

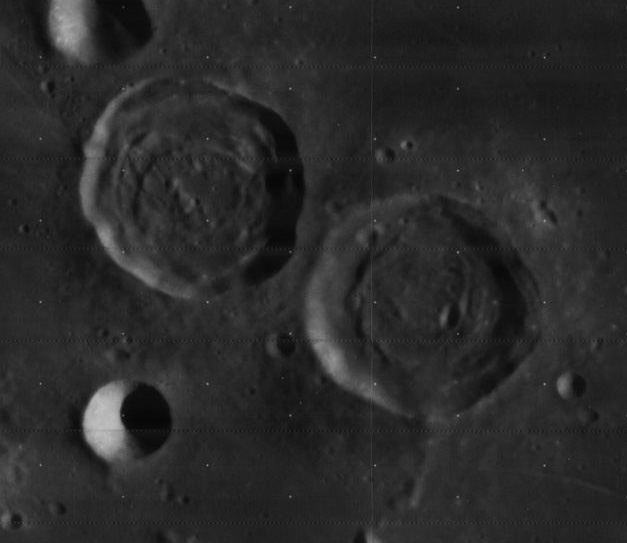
Lunar Orbiter 4 image of Sabine (right of center), Ritter (left of center), and Schmidt (lower left) craters

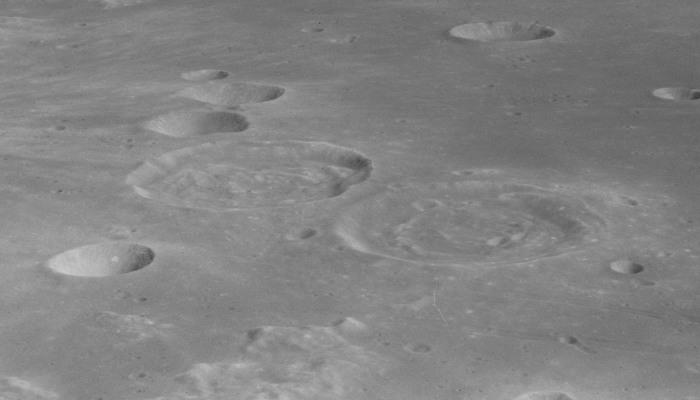
Oblique view from the south from Apollo 16

== Description ==
The outer rim of this crater is roughly circular and relatively featureless. The interior floor has a pair of small craterlets and a central rise. There is a ridge at the western edge of the floor that is concentric with the inner wall.

About 85 km to the east-southeast is 'Statio Tranquillitatis' (Tranquility Base), the landing site of the Apollo 11 mission and the first human beings to step on the Moon.

Ranger 8 flew over Sabine prior to impact in Mare Tranquilitatis.

Both Sabine and Ritter were originally believed to be calderas rather than impact craters. In To A Rocky Moon, lunar geologist Don E. Wilhelms summarized: "They are identical twins in morphology and size (29-30 km). They lack radial rim ejecta and secondary craters despite their apparent youth. They are positioned at the presumably active edge of a mare. They are even aligned along graben, the Hypatia rilles. Most significant, they lack deep floors recognized since the days of Gilbert as diagnostic of impacts." However, after the Apollo landings were complete, it was realized that "all craters inside basins suffer enhanced isostatic uplift," because "the thin crust and greater heat inside basins lower the viscosity of the craters' substrate, allowing it to reach isostasy with its surroundings more quickly than can other craters."

== Satellite craters ==
By convention these features are identified on lunar maps by placing the letter on the side of the crater midpoint that is closest to Sabine.

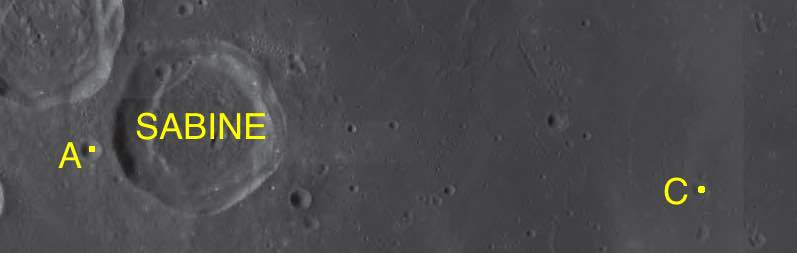
Sabine and its two satellite craters

Sabine	Latitude	Longitude	Diameter
A	1.3° N	19.5° E	4 km
C	1.0° N	23.0° E	3 km

The following craters have been renamed by the IAU, after the three astronauts of Apollo 11.

- Sabine B — See Aldrin.
- Sabine D — See Collins.
- Sabine E — See Armstrong.

A crater near the southeast rim of Sabine was referred to as Dark Crater by the Apollo 11 astronauts.
