= Collins (crater) =

Crater on the Moon

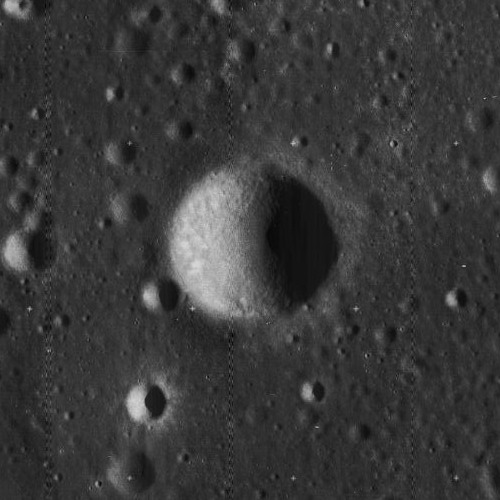
- Lunar Orbiter 5 image
- Coordinates: 1.3°N 23.7°E
- Diameter: 2.58 km (1.60 mi)
- Depth: 0.6 km (0.37 mi)
- Colongitude: 336° at sunrise
- Eponym: Michael Collins

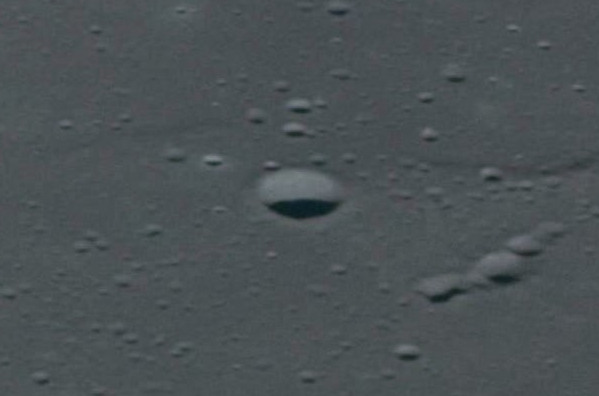
Oblique view of Collins crater from Apollo 10

Collins is a tiny lunar impact crater located on the southern part of the Mare Tranquillitatis. It is a simple, cup shape with a rim raised above the surrounding mare basalt. This crater is located about 25 kilometers to the north of the Apollo 11 landing site, Tranquility Base. Resolving it requires a telescope with an aperture of at least 150 mm (6 in).

Previously identified as Sabine D, this formation is named after American astronaut Michael Collins. Sabine itself is to the west of Collins. The Collins crater is the central member of the row of three craters named in honor of the Apollo 11 crew members. Their designations were formally adopted by the International Astronomical Union in 1970. About 15 kilometers to the west-northwest is the landing site of the Surveyor 5 lunar probe.

== See also ==
- Armstrong (crater)
- Aldrin (crater)

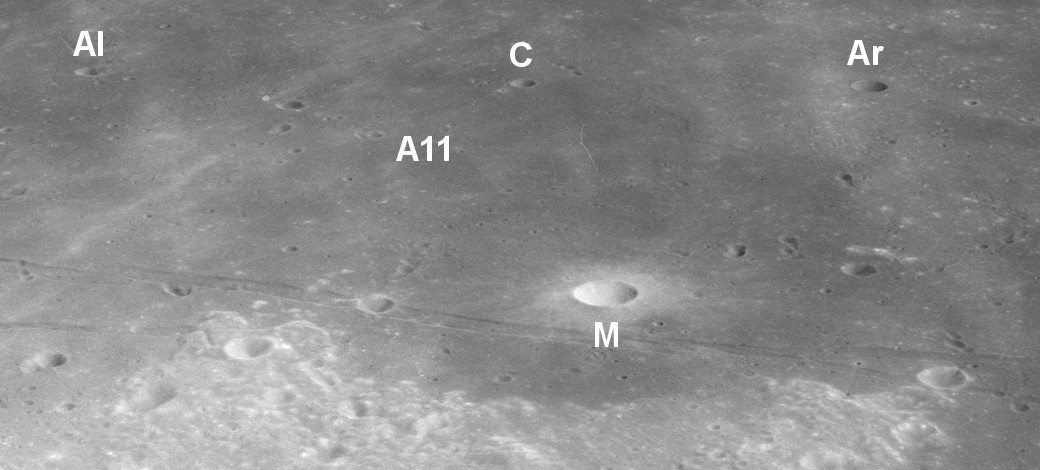
Annotated oblique view from Apollo 16 showing the vicinity of the Apollo 11 landing site (A11) with the craters Aldrin (Al), Collins (C), Armstrong (Ar), and Moltke (M), facing north.
