= Lamont (lunar crater) =

Crater on the Moon

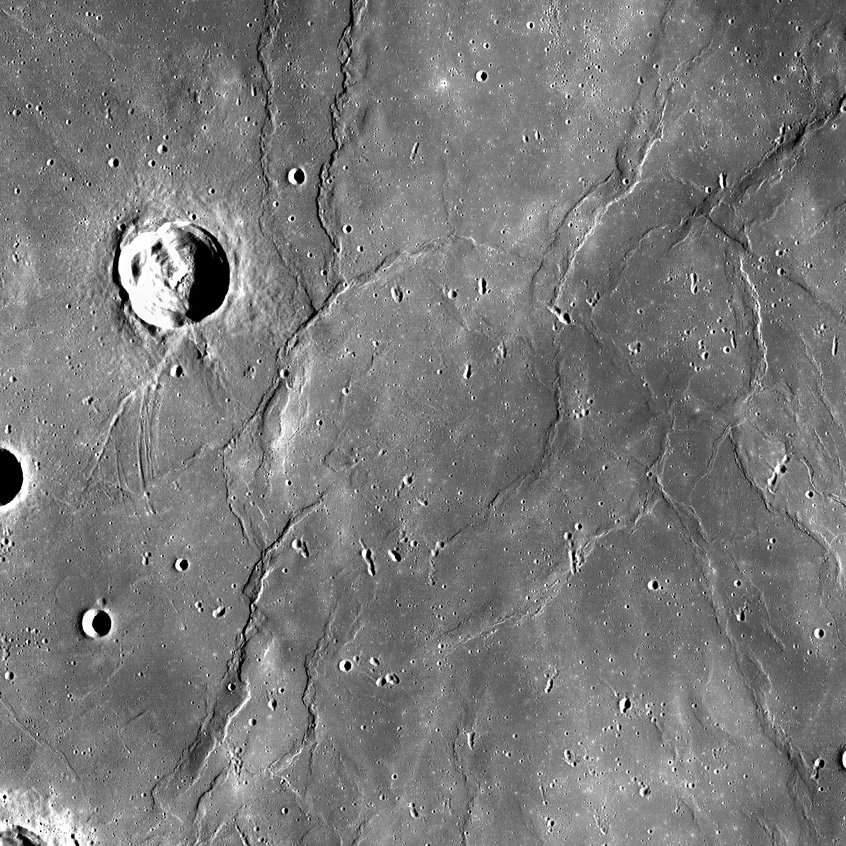
- LRO image of the predominantly submerged crater of Lamont, on the left is Arago and below is a part of Manners
- Coordinates: 5.0°N 23.2°E
- Diameter: 75 km
- Depth: Unknown
- Colongitude: 337° at sunrise
- Eponym: Johann von Lamont

Lamont is a system of low ridges in the surface of Mare Tranquillitatis that is most likely a submerged impact crater. It was named after Scottish-born German astronomer Johann von Lamont. It is located to the southeast of the crater Arago.

Lamont has the shape of two roughly concentric but incomplete rings with an inner diameter of 60 km and an outer diameter of 120 km. (The official diameter is 75 km.) Radial ridges radiate away from the center of Lamont, except in the east and west quadrants. The ridge system is only a few hundred meters in height, with a width that averages 5 km but is thicker to the southeast. This feature is only readily visible at low angles of illumination, when shadows highlight the terrain features.

This feature is associated with a mass concentration (mascon), a sub-surface region of higher-density material.
