= Arago (lunar crater) =

Crater on the Moon

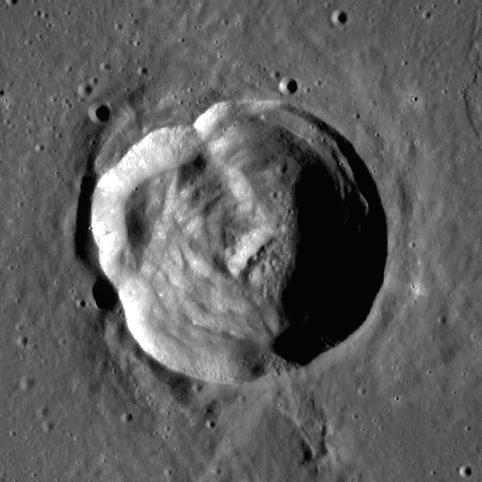
- Lunar Reconnaissance Orbiter image
- Coordinates: 6.15°N 21.43°E
- Diameter: 25.51 km
- Depth: 2.68 km
- Colongitude: 358° at sunrise
- Formation: Eratosthenian
- Eponym: François Arago

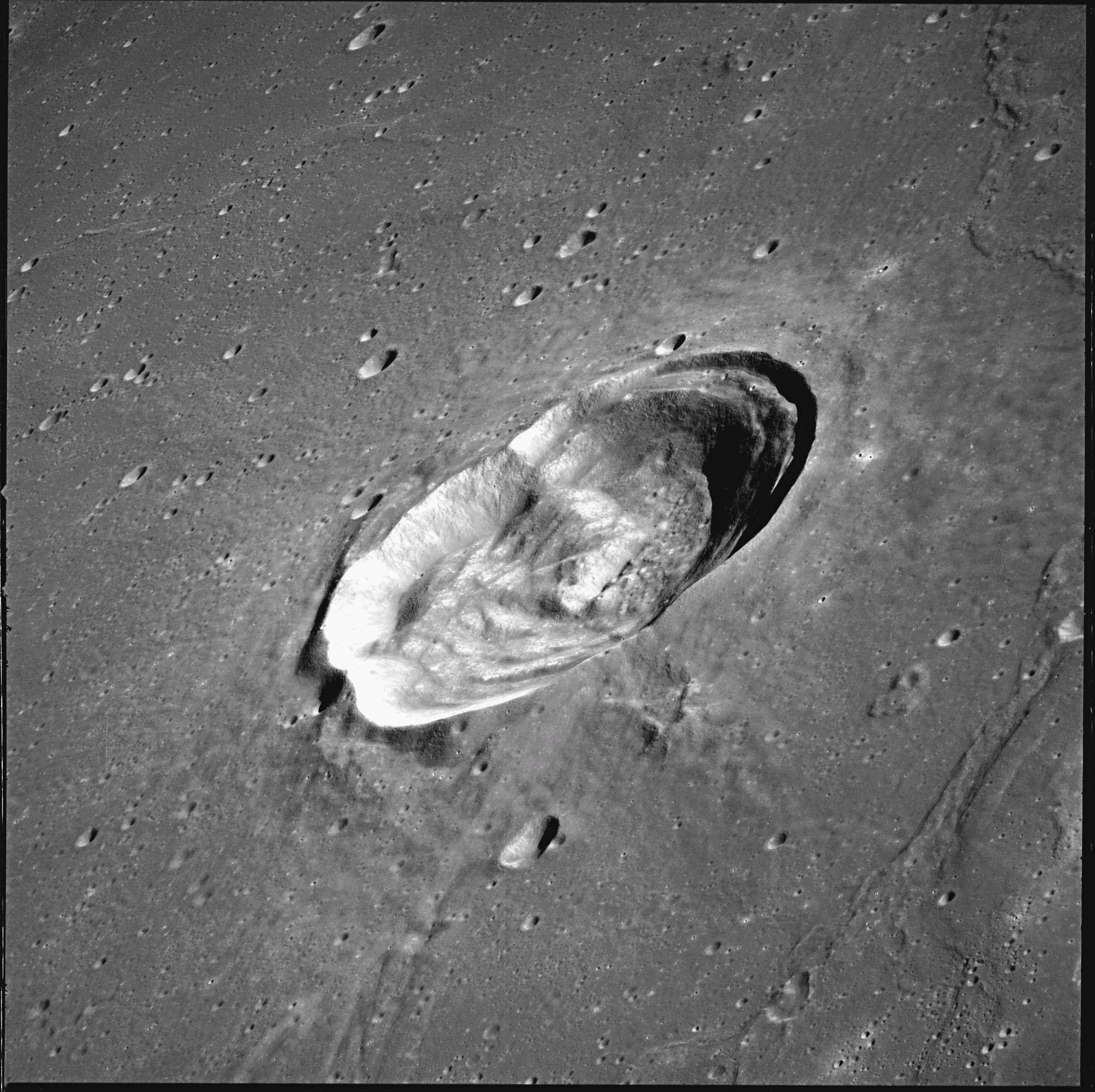
Oblique view from Apollo 10. Most of lunar dome Arago Alpha is visible along top edge of photo, right of center.

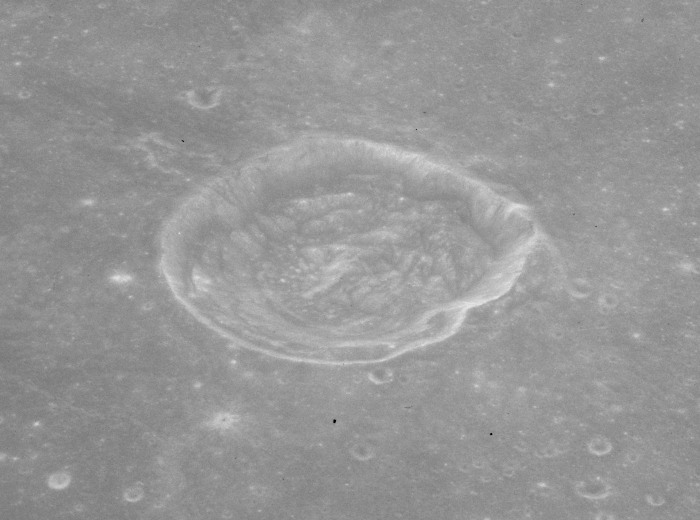
Oblique view from Apollo 15

Arago is a lunar impact crater located in the western part of the Mare Tranquillitatis. It has a diameter of 26 km and a depth of 2.7 km. To the southwest lies the crater Manners, and beyond are Dionysius and the Ritter–Sabine crater pair. To the southeast is the large Lamont formation that has been submerged by the mare.

Arago is a crater of Eratosthenian age. The rim of Arago has a bulge in the western wall. There is a central ridge that runs towards the northern wall. The surface of the mare nearby is marked by wrinkle ridges, most notably to the east and southeast. There are several domes near Arago. To the north is a large lunar dome designated Arago Alpha (α). A similar-sized lunar dome is located an equal distance to the west, designated Arago Beta (β).

This crater was named after French astronomer François Arago (1786–1853). Its designation was officially adopted by the International Astronomical Union in 1935. The name was introduced into lunar nomenclature by German astronomer Johann Madler during the 19th century.

== Satellite craters ==
By convention these features are identified on lunar maps by placing the letter on the side of the crater midpoint that is closest to Arago.

Arago	Coordinates	Diameter
B	3.43°N 20.82°E	6.9 km
C	3.89°N 21.48°E	3.0 km
D	6.91°N 22.39°E	4.0 km
E	8.51°N 22.71°E	6.3 km
