= Armstrong (crater) =

Crater on the Moon

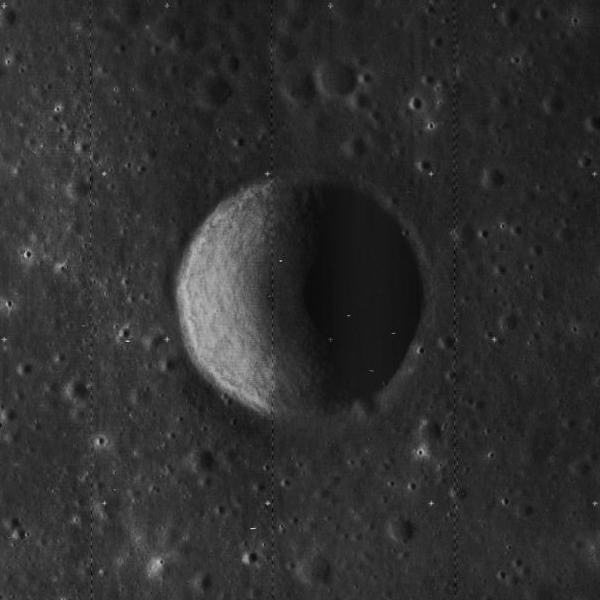
- Lunar Orbiter 5 image
- Coordinates: 1.4°N 25.0°E
- Diameter: 4.21 km (2.62 mi)
- Depth: 0.7 km (0.43 mi)
- Colongitude: 335° at sunrise
- Eponym: Neil Armstrong

Armstrong is a small, bowl-shaped lunar impact crater located in the southern part of the Mare Tranquillitatis. It lies about 50 kilometers to the northeast of the Apollo 11 landing site, Tranquility Base. Named after American astronaut Neil Armstrong (1930-2012), the crater is the easternmost of the row of three craters named in honor of the Apollo 11 crew members. Their designations were formally adopted by the International Astronomical Union in 1970. To the north is the Ranger 8 impact site.

This crater was previously identified as Sabine E before being renamed by the IAU in 1970. Sabine itself is located due west of Armstrong.

== Gallery ==
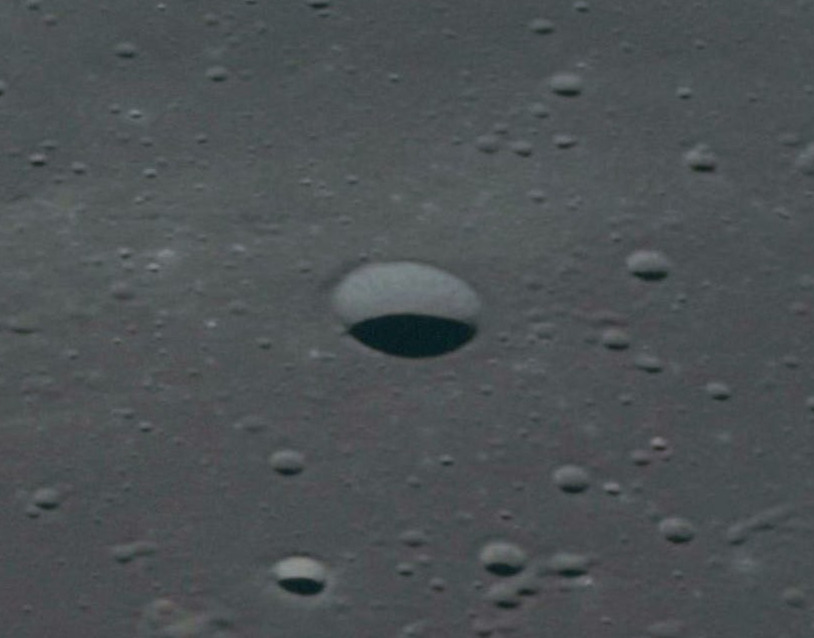
Oblique view of Armstrong crater from Apollo 10

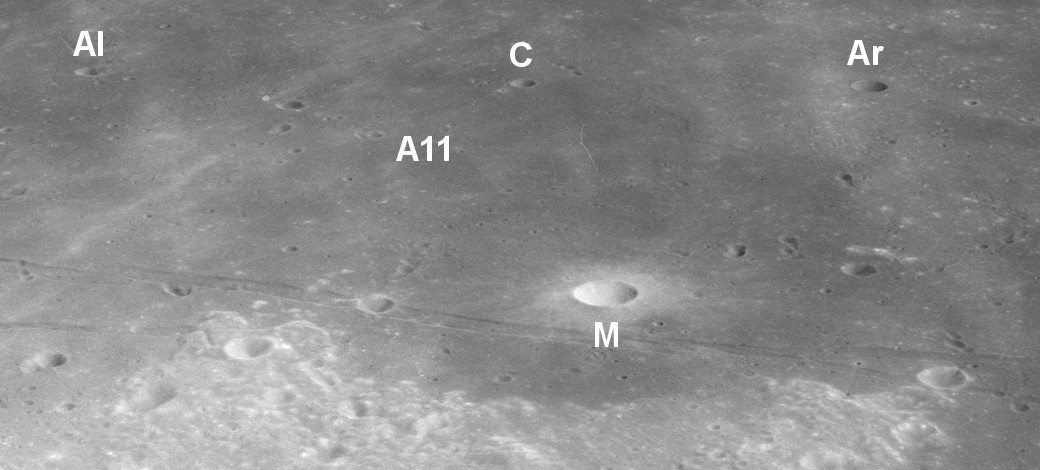
Annotated oblique view from Apollo 16 showing the vicinity of the Apollo 11 landing site (A11) with the craters Aldrin (Al), Collins (C), Armstrong (Ar), and Moltke (M), facing north.

== See also ==
- 6469 Armstrong, asteroid
- Aldrin (crater)
- Collins (crater)
