= 6470 Aldrin =

Main-belt asteroid

Discovery
- Discovered by: A. Mrkos
- Discovery site: Kleť Obs.
- Discovery date: 14 September 1982

Designations
- Named after: Buzz Aldrin (astronaut, Apollo 11)
- Alternative designations: 1982 RO_{1} · 1989 UU_{2}
- Minor planet category: main-belt · Flora

Orbital characteristics
- Epoch 4 September 2017 (JD 2458000.5)
- Uncertainty parameter 0
- Observation arc: 34.18 yr (12,485 days)
- Aphelion: 2.6217 AU
- Perihelion: 1.9283 AU
- Semi-major axis: 2.2750 AU
- Eccentricity: 0.1524
- Orbital period (sidereal): 3.43 yr (1,253 days)
- Mean anomaly: 43.625°
- Mean motion: 0° 17^{m} 13.92^{s} / day
- Inclination: 2.7915°
- Longitude of ascending node: 237.94°
- Argument of perihelion: 152.48°

Physical characteristics
- Dimensions: 3.00 km (calculated)
- Synodic rotation period: 5.9944±0.0014 h
- Geometric albedo: 0.24 (assumed)
- Spectral type: S
- Absolute magnitude (H): 14.3 · 14.88±0.23 · 14.329±0.002 (R) · 14.78

6470 Aldrin, provisional designation 1982 RO_{1}, is a stony Flora asteroid from the inner regions of the asteroid belt, approximately 3 kilometers in diameter.

The asteroid was discovered by Czech astronomer Antonín Mrkos at Kleť Observatory on 14 September 1982. It was named for American astronaut Buzz Aldrin.

== Orbit and classification ==
Aldrin is a member of the Flora family, one of the largest groups of stony asteroids in the main-belt. It orbits the Sun in the inner main-belt at a distance of 1.9–2.6 AU once every 3 years and 5 months (1,253 days). Its orbit has an eccentricity of 0.15 and an inclination of 3° with respect to the ecliptic. The asteroid's observation arc begins in 1982, as no precoveries were taken and no prior identifications were made.

== Physical characteristics ==
A rotational lightcurve of Aldrin was obtained from photometric observations made at the U.S. Palomar Transient Factory in September 2013. The lightcurve gave a rotation period of 5.9944±0.0014 hours with a brightness variation of 0.82 in magnitude (U=2).

The Collaborative Asteroid Lightcurve Link assumes an albedo of 0.24 – derived from 8 Flora, the largest member and namesake of this orbital family – and calculates a diameter of 3.0 kilometers with an absolute magnitude of 14.78.

== Naming ==
This minor planet was named for American astronaut Buzz Aldrin (born 1930), on the occasion of the 30th anniversary of the Apollo 11 mission.

He was one of the first two humans to land on the Moon, and the second person to walk on it, following Neil Armstrong, after whom the asteroid 6469 Armstrong is named. Its name was suggested by Czech astronomers Jana Tichá, Miloš Tichý and Zdeněk Moravec, who observed the asteroid during its 1995-opposition, shortly before being numbered. The official naming citation was published by the Minor Planet Center on 4 May 1999 (M.P.C. 34623).
