= Nikon Coolpix L100 =

Digital camera model

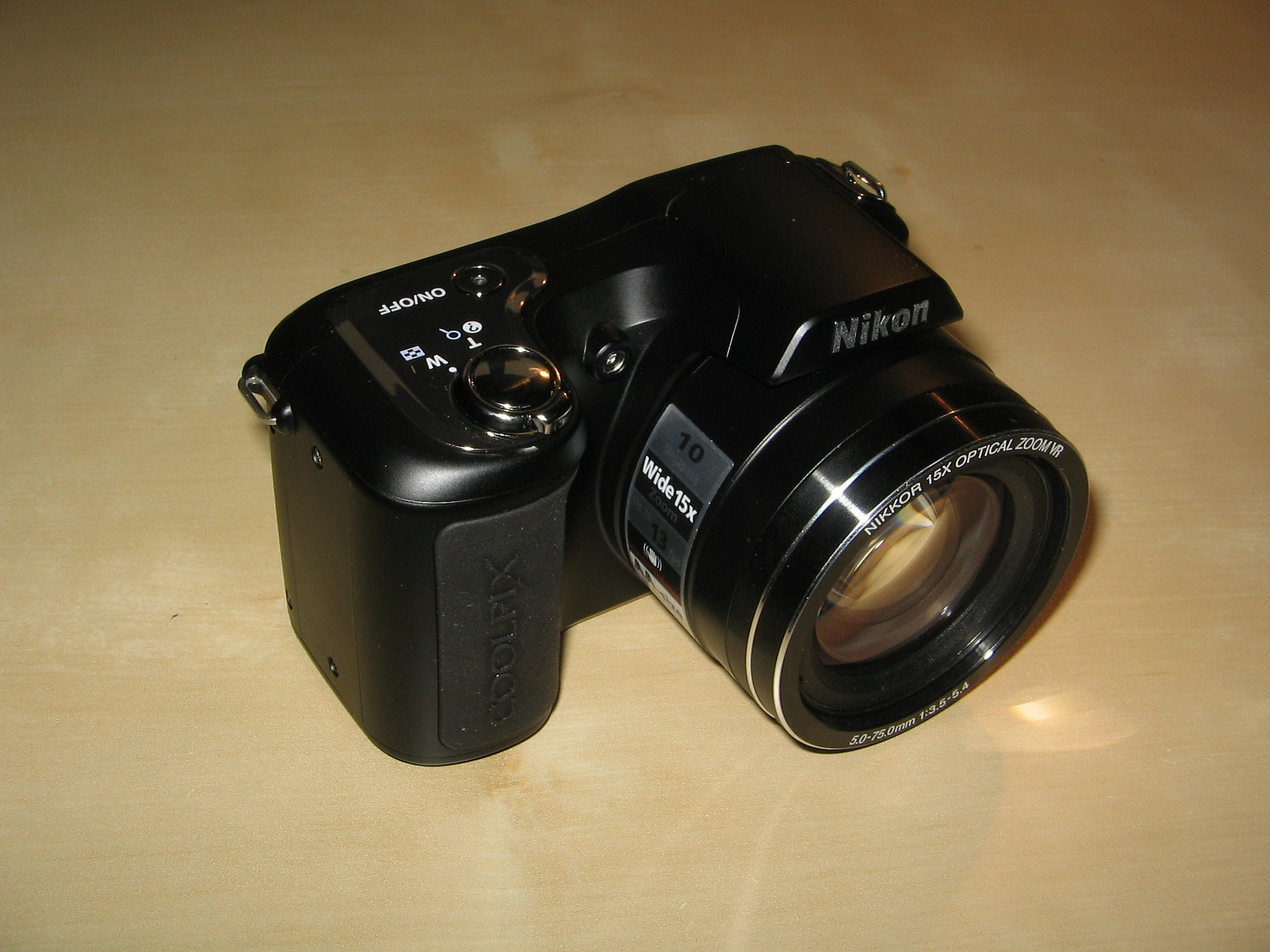
- The Nikon L100

Overview
- Maker: Nikon
- Type: Compact digital camera

Lens
- Lens: 15x Optical Zoom-NIKKOR Glass Lens, f3.5 – f5.4

Sensor/medium
- Sensor: 10 megapixels
- Maximum resolution: 3,648 × 2,736
- Storage media: microSD or SDHC

Exposure/metering
- Exposure metering: Three-mode through-the-lens (TTL) exposure metering

General
- LCD screen: 3-inch TFT LCD
- Battery: Alkaline battery
- Weight: About 355 g without battery, memory card, body cap, or monitor cover
- Made in: Thailand, Vietnam

The Nikon Coolpix L100 is a semi-compact digital camera introduced by Nikon Corporation in 2009 as part of the Nikon Coolpix series. It belonged to the "Life" series of Nikon digital cameras, which were intended for beginner and amateur users. It was replaced by the Nikon Coolpix L120 in 2011.

== Description ==
The Nikon Coolpix L100 provided good results without the operator needing to acquire professional-level skills. The L100 was a good choice for beginners and amateurs. With an optical zoom of 15x, it is an improvement over older compact digital cameras that generally had a maximum optical zoom of 5x. The Nikon Coolpix L100 competed against the Sony DSC-H20 and Canon Sx120, which have similar configurations and were available at similar prices.

== Features ==
- Angular glass lens Nikkor reaching an optical zoom up to 15x (28–420 mm)
- Shutter 1 / 1000 – 2 sec
- Sensor 10 megapixels (500 x 760 mm)
- Setting ISO 80–3200
- Viewfinder: 3-inch LCD
- Power standard for AA batteries: alkaline or lithium batteries (recommended by the manufacturer); support for NiMH batteries can be added by upgrading the firmware
- JPEG photo

== Compatibility with rechargeable batteries ==
Due to a bug in the camera's firmware, rechargeable batteries cannot keep up with the power demands of the camera. An upgrade of the firmware is available from the company's website.
