= Ritter (crater) =

Crater on the Moon

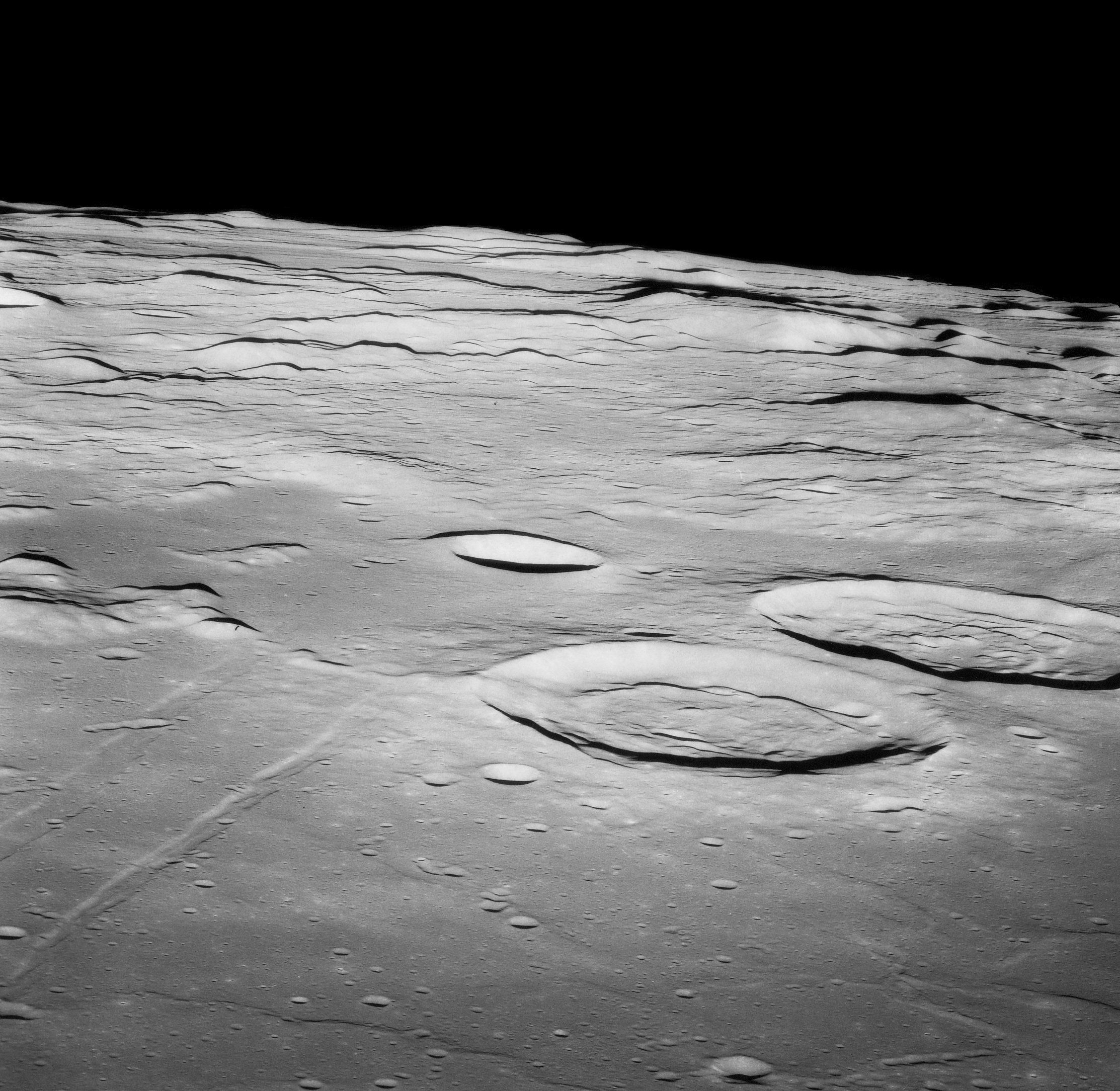
- The crater pair Sabine (center right) and Ritter (right), from Apollo 11
- Coordinates: 2.0°N 19.2°E
- Diameter: 29.5 km (18.3 mi)
- Depth: 1.3 km (0.81 mi)
- Colongitude: 341° at sunrise
- Eponym: Carl Ritter and August Ritter

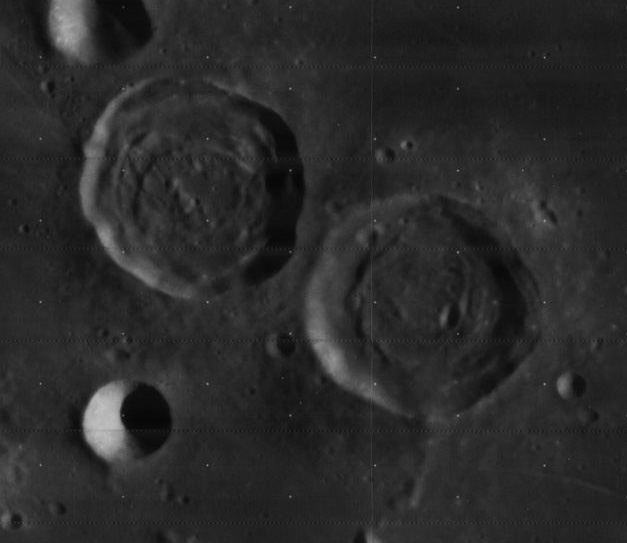
Lunar Orbiter 4 image of Sabine (right of center), Ritter (left of center), and Schmidt (lower left) craters

Ritter is a lunar impact crater located near the southwestern edge of Mare Tranquillitatis. Its diameter is 29.5 km. It was named after German geographer Carl Ritter and German astrophysicist August Ritter.

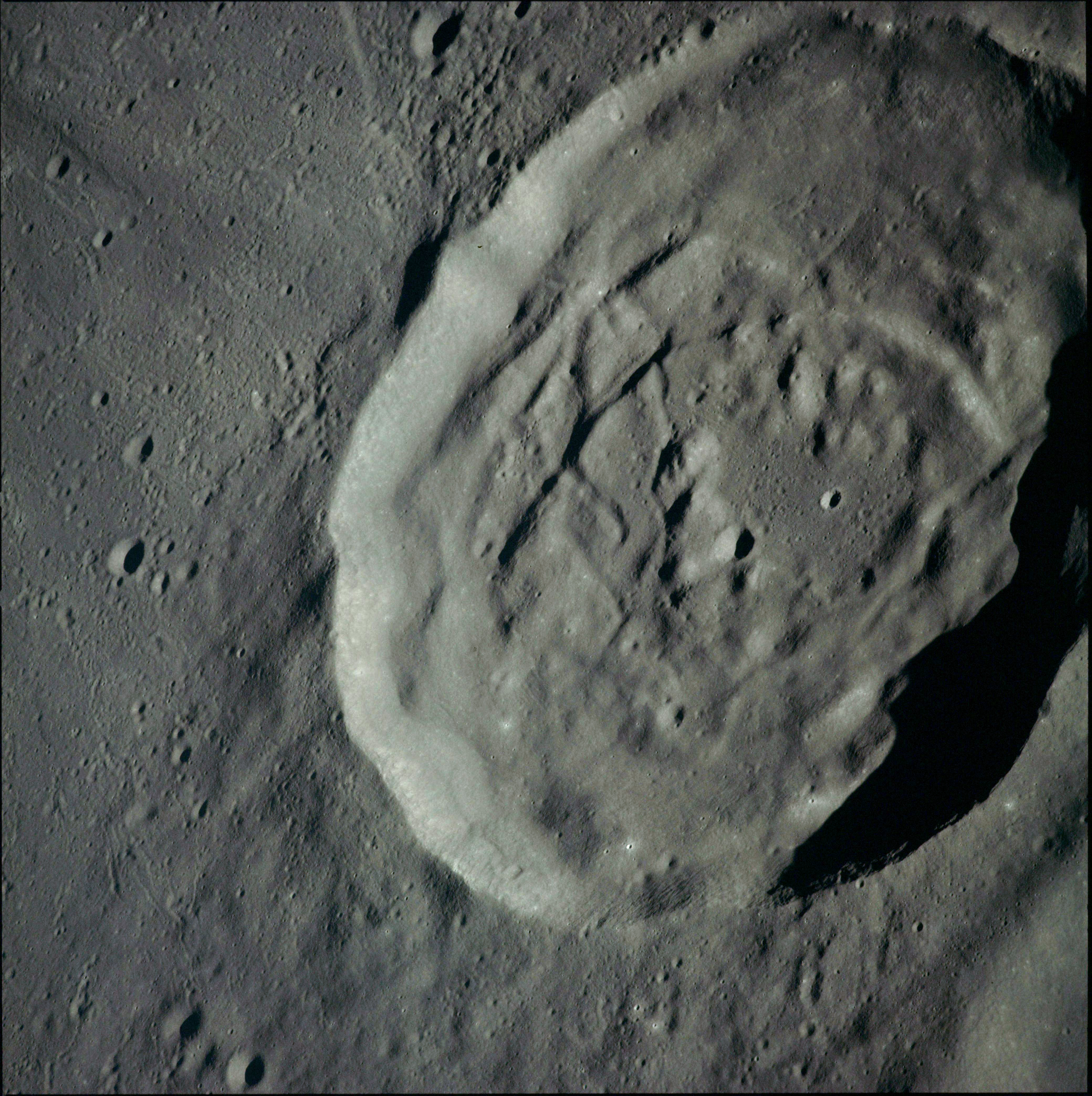
Apollo 10 image of Ritter

It is the northwestern member of a crater pair with Sabine to the southeast. To the northwest is the crater Dionysius, and to the north-northeast are Manners and Arago. This crater is roughly circular but with an irregular outer rim. The inner walls have slumped down towards the floor. The interior is irregular with several low ridges. To the northwest of Ritter is a system of parallel rilles designated Rimae Ritter. These follow a course to the northwest. Ranger 8 flew over Ritter prior to impact in Mare Tranquilitatis.

Both Sabine and Ritter were originally believed to be calderas rather than impact craters. In To A Rocky Moon, lunar geologist Don E. Wilhelms summarized: "They are identical twins in morphology and size (29-30 km). They lack radial rim ejecta and secondary craters despite their apparent youth. They are positioned at the presumably active edge of a mare. They are even aligned along graben, the Hypatia rilles. Most significant, they lack deep floors recognized since the days of Gilbert as diagnostic of impacts." However, after the Apollo landings were complete, it was realized that "all craters inside basins suffer enhanced isostatic uplift," because "the thin crust and greater heat inside basins lower the viscosity of the craters' substrate, allowing it to reach isostasy with its surroundings more quickly than can other craters."

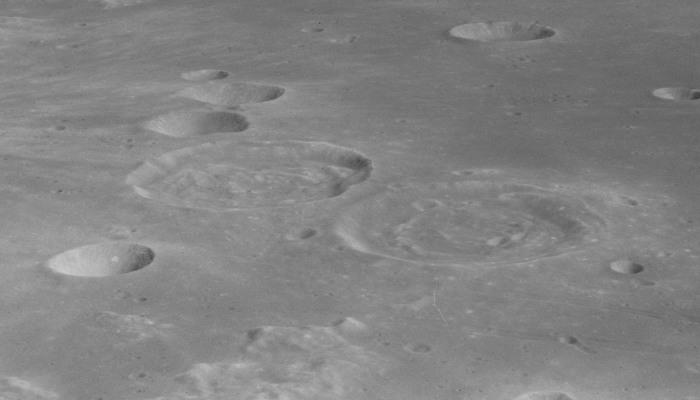
Oblique view from the south from Apollo 16

== Satellite craters ==
By convention these features are identified on lunar maps by placing the letter on the side of the crater midpoint that is closest to Ritter.

Ritter	Latitude	Longitude	Diameter
B	3.3° N	18.9° E	14 km
C	2.8° N	18.9° E	14 km
D	3.7° N	18.8° E	7 km
