= Moltke (crater) =

Crater on the Moon

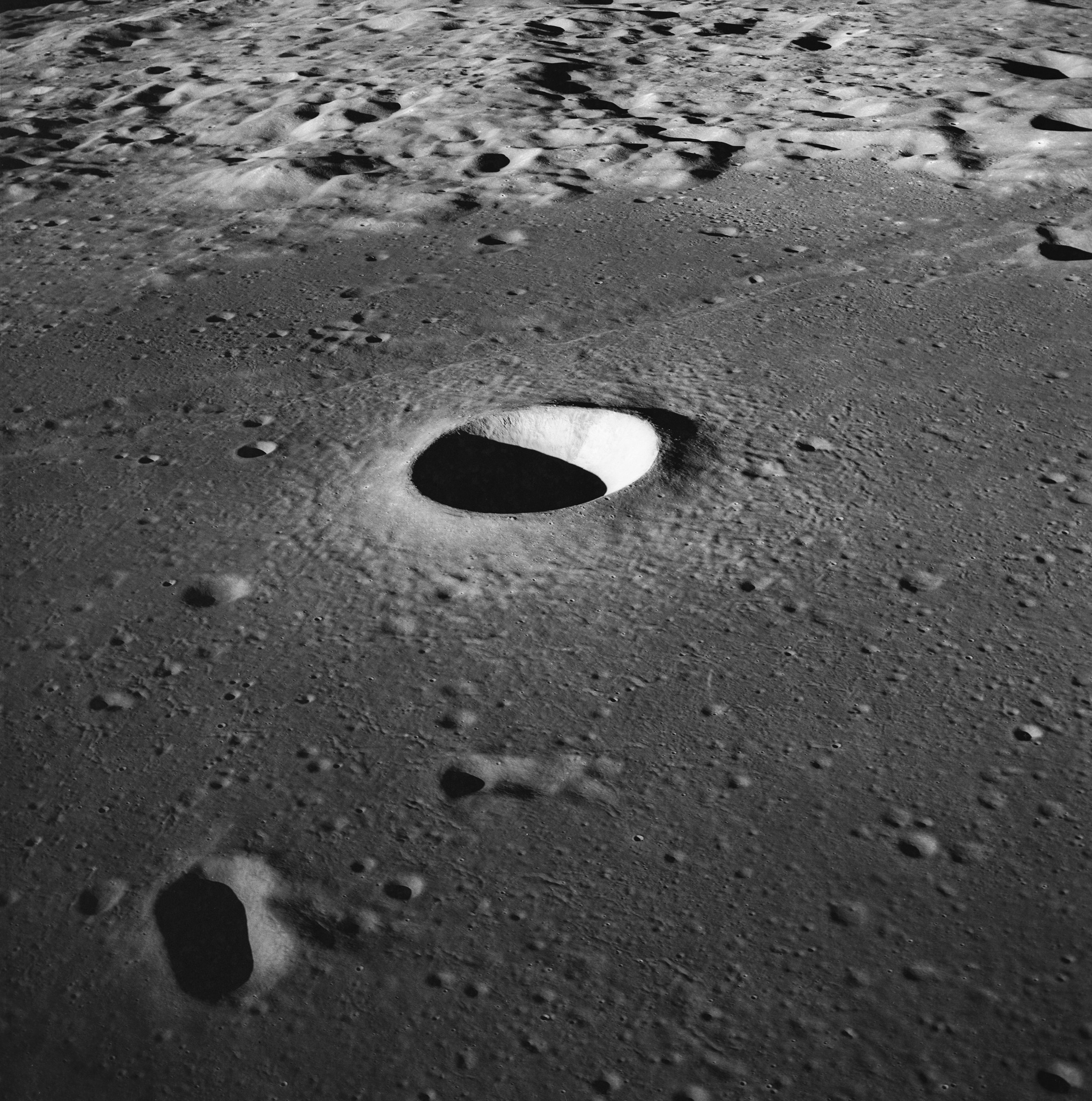
- Moltke from Apollo 10
- Coordinates: 0.6°S 24.2°E
- Diameter: 6.5 km
- Depth: 1.3 km
- Colongitude: 336° at sunrise
- Eponym: Helmuth Graf von Moltke

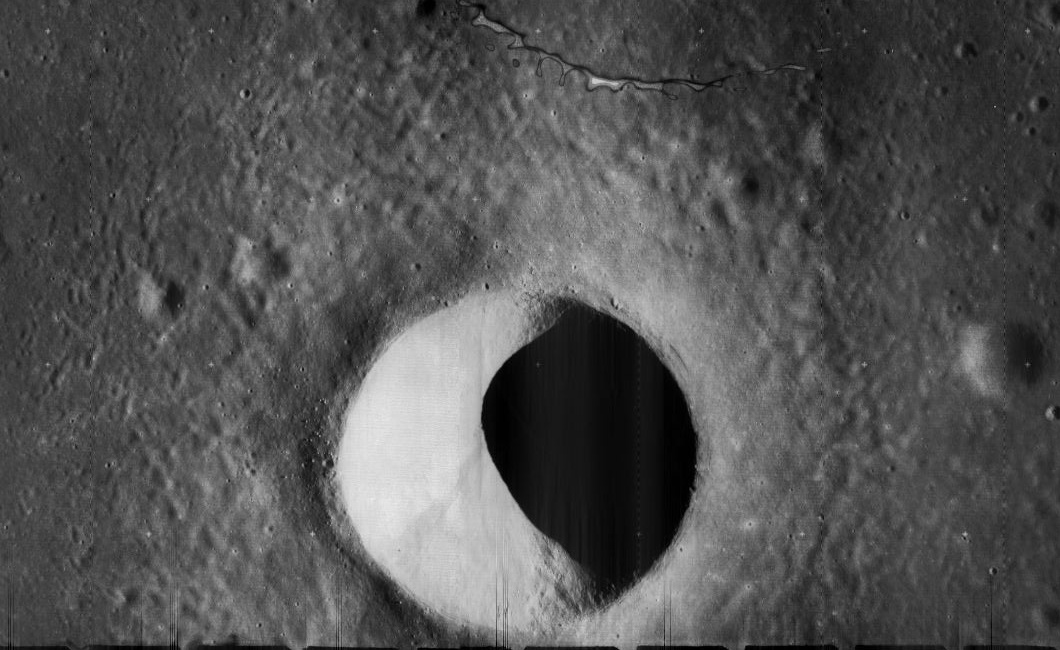
High-resolution view from Lunar Orbiter 5

Moltke is a lunar impact crater near the southern edge of the Mare Tranquillitatis. It is a small, bowl-shaped crater surrounded by a bright halo of higher-albedo material. Just to the south lies the rille system named Rimae Hypatia. These follow a course running roughly east-southeast to west-northwest, and have a length of approximately 180 kilometers.

About 50 kilometers to the northwest of this crater is Tranquility Base, the 1969 landing site of Apollo 11.

The crater is named after German army general and author Helmuth von Moltke the Elder (1800–1891). Its designation was formally adopted by the International Astronomical Union in 1935.

== Satellite craters ==
By convention these features are identified on lunar maps by placing the letter on the side of the crater midpoint that is closest to Moltke.

Moltke	Latitude	Longitude	Diameter
A	1.0° S	23.2° E	4 km
B	1.0° S	25.2° E	5 km

Moltke B was informally called Little Moltke by the Apollo 10 and Apollo 11 crews.
