= List of minor planets: 462001–463000 =

The following is a partial list of minor planets, running from minor-planet number 462001 through 463000, inclusive. The primary data for this and other partial lists is based on JPL's "Small-Body Orbital Elements" and data available from the Minor Planet Center. Critical list information is also provided by the MPC, unless otherwise specified from Lowell Observatory. A detailed description of the table's columns and additional sources are given on the main page including a complete list of every page in this series, and a statistical break-up on the dynamical classification of minor planets.

Also see the summary list of all named bodies in numerical and alphabetical order, and the corresponding naming citations for the number range of this particular list. New namings may only be added to this list after official publication, as the preannouncement of names is condemned by the Working Group for Small Bodies Nomenclature of the International Astronomical Union.

Near-Earth obj.	MBA (inner)	MBA (outer)	Centaur
Mars-crosser	MBA (middle)	Jupiter trojan	Trans-Neptunian obj.
Unclassified

== 462001–462100 ==
Designation			Discovery			Properties		Ref
Permanent	Provisional	Named after	Date	Site	Discoverer(s)	Category	Diam.	Ref
462001	2006 WU_{152}	—	November 21, 2006	Mount Lemmon	Mount Lemmon Survey	·	1.1 km	MPC · JPL
462002	2006 WG_{161}	—	November 15, 2006	Kitt Peak	Spacewatch	·	1.0 km	MPC · JPL
462003	2006 WG_{163}	—	October 21, 2006	Mount Lemmon	Mount Lemmon Survey	·	1.2 km	MPC · JPL
462004	2006 WE_{167}	—	November 15, 2006	Kitt Peak	Spacewatch	·	990 m	MPC · JPL
462005	2006 WV_{167}	—	November 11, 2006	Kitt Peak	Spacewatch	·	760 m	MPC · JPL
462006	2006 WZ_{200}	—	November 24, 2006	Mount Lemmon	Mount Lemmon Survey	·	1.4 km	MPC · JPL
462007	2006 WL_{202}	—	November 24, 2006	Kitt Peak	Spacewatch	·	1.4 km	MPC · JPL
462008	2006 XV_{6}	—	December 9, 2006	Kitt Peak	Spacewatch	·	1.1 km	MPC · JPL
462009	2006 XD_{8}	—	December 9, 2006	Palomar	NEAT	·	1.3 km	MPC · JPL
462010	2006 XO_{16}	—	December 10, 2006	Kitt Peak	Spacewatch	·	1.2 km	MPC · JPL
462011	2006 XO_{18}	—	October 27, 2006	Kitt Peak	Spacewatch	·	1.2 km	MPC · JPL
462012	2006 XT_{20}	—	December 11, 2006	Kitt Peak	Spacewatch	T_{j} (2.97) · 3:2	4.8 km	MPC · JPL
462013	2006 XC_{46}	—	November 27, 2006	Kitt Peak	Spacewatch	ADE	1.4 km	MPC · JPL
462014	2006 XA_{62}	—	November 16, 2006	Mount Lemmon	Mount Lemmon Survey	EUN	1.1 km	MPC · JPL
462015	2006 XA_{65}	—	December 13, 2006	Catalina	CSS	·	1.9 km	MPC · JPL
462016	2006 XQ_{65}	—	November 17, 2006	Kitt Peak	Spacewatch	·	1.4 km	MPC · JPL
462017	2006 XC_{71}	—	December 14, 2006	Mount Lemmon	Mount Lemmon Survey	·	990 m	MPC · JPL
462018	2006 YJ_{5}	—	September 21, 2001	Kitt Peak	Spacewatch	·	1.6 km	MPC · JPL
462019	2006 YS_{40}	—	December 14, 2006	Kitt Peak	Spacewatch	·	1.5 km	MPC · JPL
462020	2006 YA_{54}	—	December 27, 2006	Kitt Peak	Spacewatch	·	1.3 km	MPC · JPL
462021	2007 AG_{10}	—	December 17, 2006	Mount Lemmon	Mount Lemmon Survey	·	1.6 km	MPC · JPL
462022	2007 AL_{21}	—	December 26, 2006	Kitt Peak	Spacewatch	·	2.1 km	MPC · JPL
462023	2007 AV_{27}	—	November 25, 2006	Mount Lemmon	Mount Lemmon Survey	·	1.4 km	MPC · JPL
462024	2007 BZ_{16}	—	January 17, 2007	Palomar	NEAT	·	1.8 km	MPC · JPL
462025	2007 BZ_{18}	—	November 18, 2006	Mount Lemmon	Mount Lemmon Survey	·	1.4 km	MPC · JPL
462026	2007 BR_{24}	—	September 1, 2005	Kitt Peak	Spacewatch	·	1.3 km	MPC · JPL
462027	2007 BW_{25}	—	September 30, 2005	Kitt Peak	Spacewatch	·	1.8 km	MPC · JPL
462028	2007 BZ_{36}	—	December 13, 2006	Mount Lemmon	Mount Lemmon Survey	BRG	1.5 km	MPC · JPL
462029	2007 BO_{52}	—	January 17, 2007	Kitt Peak	Spacewatch	·	1.6 km	MPC · JPL
462030	2007 BG_{67}	—	January 27, 2007	Mount Lemmon	Mount Lemmon Survey	·	1.6 km	MPC · JPL
462031	2007 BA_{77}	—	January 25, 2007	Catalina	CSS	·	1.6 km	MPC · JPL
462032	2007 BT_{100}	—	January 27, 2007	Mount Lemmon	Mount Lemmon Survey	·	1.5 km	MPC · JPL
462033	2007 CR_{14}	—	February 7, 2007	Mount Lemmon	Mount Lemmon Survey	EUN	1.5 km	MPC · JPL
462034	2007 CA_{16}	—	February 6, 2007	Palomar	NEAT	·	1.7 km	MPC · JPL
462035	2007 CA_{17}	—	January 27, 2007	Kitt Peak	Spacewatch	·	2.7 km	MPC · JPL
462036	2007 CV_{38}	—	January 27, 2007	Mount Lemmon	Mount Lemmon Survey	·	1.5 km	MPC · JPL
462037	2007 CZ_{61}	—	February 10, 2007	Catalina	CSS	·	1.8 km	MPC · JPL
462038	2007 CD_{62}	—	January 15, 2007	Catalina	CSS	·	1.8 km	MPC · JPL
462039	2007 CM_{62}	—	February 13, 2007	Socorro	LINEAR	·	2.4 km	MPC · JPL
462040	2007 DQ_{2}	—	February 16, 2007	Catalina	CSS	·	1.3 km	MPC · JPL
462041	2007 DL_{8}	—	February 21, 2007	Mount Lemmon	Mount Lemmon Survey	T_{j} (2.82) · APO +1km	1.8 km	MPC · JPL
462042	2007 DW_{16}	—	February 17, 2007	Kitt Peak	Spacewatch	·	1.9 km	MPC · JPL
462043	2007 DX_{21}	—	February 17, 2007	Kitt Peak	Spacewatch	·	1.9 km	MPC · JPL
462044	2007 DA_{30}	—	February 17, 2007	Kitt Peak	Spacewatch	·	1.4 km	MPC · JPL
462045	2007 DW_{39}	—	December 27, 2006	Mount Lemmon	Mount Lemmon Survey	·	1.7 km	MPC · JPL
462046	2007 DP_{57}	—	February 21, 2007	Mount Lemmon	Mount Lemmon Survey	·	1.7 km	MPC · JPL
462047	2007 DC_{92}	—	February 23, 2007	Kitt Peak	Spacewatch	·	1.8 km	MPC · JPL
462048	2007 DT_{111}	—	February 25, 2007	Kitt Peak	Spacewatch	·	2.2 km	MPC · JPL
462049	2007 DM_{112}	—	February 25, 2007	Mount Lemmon	Mount Lemmon Survey	·	2.1 km	MPC · JPL
462050	2007 EN_{10}	—	January 28, 2007	Kitt Peak	Spacewatch	·	1.8 km	MPC · JPL
462051	2007 EF_{16}	—	March 9, 2007	Mount Lemmon	Mount Lemmon Survey	·	1.5 km	MPC · JPL
462052	2007 EN_{21}	—	February 8, 2007	Mount Lemmon	Mount Lemmon Survey	·	1.2 km	MPC · JPL
462053	2007 EY_{21}	—	March 10, 2007	Kitt Peak	Spacewatch	·	1.7 km	MPC · JPL
462054	2007 EJ_{22}	—	February 23, 2007	Mount Lemmon	Mount Lemmon Survey	·	1.8 km	MPC · JPL
462055	2007 EX_{26}	—	March 12, 2007	Kleť	Kleť	EUN	1.3 km	MPC · JPL
462056	2007 EM_{30}	—	March 9, 2007	Mount Lemmon	Mount Lemmon Survey	·	1.5 km	MPC · JPL
462057	2007 ES_{54}	—	January 8, 2002	Socorro	LINEAR	MRX	1.1 km	MPC · JPL
462058	2007 ER_{65}	—	February 21, 2007	Kitt Peak	Spacewatch	·	1.7 km	MPC · JPL
462059	2007 EN_{73}	—	February 25, 2007	Kitt Peak	Spacewatch	·	2.4 km	MPC · JPL
462060	2007 ES_{73}	—	March 10, 2007	Mount Lemmon	Mount Lemmon Survey	EUN	1.1 km	MPC · JPL
462061	2007 ES_{82}	—	January 17, 2007	Kitt Peak	Spacewatch	·	1.1 km	MPC · JPL
462062	2007 EJ_{84}	—	March 12, 2007	Mount Lemmon	Mount Lemmon Survey	MRX	860 m	MPC · JPL
462063	2007 EK_{89}	—	February 23, 2007	Mount Lemmon	Mount Lemmon Survey	·	1.5 km	MPC · JPL
462064	2007 EC_{101}	—	March 11, 2007	Kitt Peak	Spacewatch	·	2.0 km	MPC · JPL
462065	2007 EE_{103}	—	February 23, 2007	Mount Lemmon	Mount Lemmon Survey	·	1.3 km	MPC · JPL
462066	2007 ED_{121}	—	March 14, 2007	Mount Lemmon	Mount Lemmon Survey	JUN	1.5 km	MPC · JPL
462067	2007 EA_{126}	—	February 26, 2007	Mount Lemmon	Mount Lemmon Survey	JUN	1.2 km	MPC · JPL
462068	2007 EL_{134}	—	March 9, 2007	Kitt Peak	Spacewatch	·	2.4 km	MPC · JPL
462069	2007 ES_{135}	—	March 10, 2007	Mount Lemmon	Mount Lemmon Survey	GEF	1.0 km	MPC · JPL
462070	2007 EH_{138}	—	March 12, 2007	Kitt Peak	Spacewatch	·	1.3 km	MPC · JPL
462071	2007 EX_{138}	—	March 12, 2007	Kitt Peak	Spacewatch	HOF	2.3 km	MPC · JPL
462072	2007 EQ_{149}	—	March 12, 2007	Mount Lemmon	Mount Lemmon Survey	·	1.4 km	MPC · JPL
462073	2007 ER_{217}	—	March 13, 2007	Mount Lemmon	Mount Lemmon Survey	·	1.6 km	MPC · JPL
462074	2007 EF_{218}	—	March 9, 2007	Mount Lemmon	Mount Lemmon Survey	AGN	1 km	MPC · JPL
462075	2007 EG_{218}	—	March 9, 2007	Mount Lemmon	Mount Lemmon Survey	·	1.9 km	MPC · JPL
462076	2007 EX_{220}	—	March 13, 2007	Kitt Peak	Spacewatch	·	1.6 km	MPC · JPL
462077	2007 EU_{223}	—	March 12, 2007	Kitt Peak	Spacewatch	·	1.8 km	MPC · JPL
462078 Carlosbriones	2007 FS_{4}	Carlosbriones	March 18, 2007	Pla D'Arguines	R. Ferrando	DOR	2.0 km	MPC · JPL
462079	2007 FF_{21}	—	March 20, 2007	Mount Lemmon	Mount Lemmon Survey	·	1.3 km	MPC · JPL
462080	2007 FH_{25}	—	March 20, 2007	Kitt Peak	Spacewatch	NEM	2.1 km	MPC · JPL
462081	2007 FU_{25}	—	March 9, 2007	Kitt Peak	Spacewatch	·	1.7 km	MPC · JPL
462082	2007 FC_{40}	—	March 17, 2007	Anderson Mesa	LONEOS	·	1.8 km	MPC · JPL
462083	2007 FE_{45}	—	March 16, 2007	Mount Lemmon	Mount Lemmon Survey	NEM	1.6 km	MPC · JPL
462084	2007 GJ_{1}	—	March 15, 2007	Kitt Peak	Spacewatch	·	1.5 km	MPC · JPL
462085	2007 GB_{9}	—	March 11, 2007	Mount Lemmon	Mount Lemmon Survey	L5	10 km	MPC · JPL
462086	2007 GS_{15}	—	April 11, 2007	Mount Lemmon	Mount Lemmon Survey	·	1.6 km	MPC · JPL
462087	2007 GW_{15}	—	September 24, 2000	Kitt Peak	Spacewatch	·	1.9 km	MPC · JPL
462088	2007 GV_{30}	—	April 14, 2007	Mount Lemmon	Mount Lemmon Survey	·	1.8 km	MPC · JPL
462089	2007 GA_{40}	—	April 14, 2007	Kitt Peak	Spacewatch	DOR	2.0 km	MPC · JPL
462090	2007 GU_{72}	—	March 13, 2007	Kitt Peak	Spacewatch	·	1.7 km	MPC · JPL
462091	2007 HJ_{4}	—	March 13, 2007	Mount Lemmon	Mount Lemmon Survey	·	2.4 km	MPC · JPL
462092	2007 HA_{22}	—	April 18, 2007	Kitt Peak	Spacewatch	·	1.6 km	MPC · JPL
462093	2007 HR_{35}	—	April 19, 2007	Kitt Peak	Spacewatch	DOR	2.2 km	MPC · JPL
462094	2007 HF_{57}	—	April 22, 2007	Mount Lemmon	Mount Lemmon Survey	·	1.7 km	MPC · JPL
462095	2007 HD_{98}	—	April 19, 2007	Mount Lemmon	Mount Lemmon Survey	·	3.1 km	MPC · JPL
462096	2007 JL_{17}	—	May 7, 2007	Kitt Peak	Spacewatch	·	1.2 km	MPC · JPL
462097	2007 KQ_{2}	—	May 16, 2007	Catalina	CSS	·	2.1 km	MPC · JPL
462098	2007 LM_{37}	—	June 15, 2007	Kitt Peak	Spacewatch	·	1.6 km	MPC · JPL
462099	2007 MS_{13}	—	June 18, 2007	Kitt Peak	Spacewatch	·	2.6 km	MPC · JPL
462100	2007 MN_{24}	—	June 15, 2007	Kitt Peak	Spacewatch	·	670 m	MPC · JPL

== 462101–462200 ==
back to top

Designation			Discovery			Properties		Ref
Permanent	Provisional	Named after	Date	Site	Discoverer(s)	Category	Diam.	Ref
462101	2007 PN_{20}	—	August 9, 2007	Socorro	LINEAR	·	780 m	MPC · JPL
462102	2007 PN_{24}	—	August 12, 2007	Socorro	LINEAR	·	790 m	MPC · JPL
462103	2007 PY_{47}	—	August 9, 2007	Socorro	LINEAR	·	2.3 km	MPC · JPL
462104	2007 QJ_{2}	—	August 18, 2007	Bergisch Gladbach	W. Bickel	·	2.9 km	MPC · JPL
462105	2007 QS_{5}	—	August 18, 2007	XuYi	PMO NEO Survey Program	·	690 m	MPC · JPL
462106	2007 RF_{11}	—	September 5, 2007	Siding Spring	K. Sárneczky, L. Kiss	·	3.0 km	MPC · JPL
462107	2007 RH_{11}	—	September 11, 2007	Catalina	CSS	·	1.2 km	MPC · JPL
462108	2007 RC_{24}	—	September 3, 2007	Catalina	CSS	(2076)	820 m	MPC · JPL
462109	2007 RW_{33}	—	September 5, 2007	Mount Lemmon	Mount Lemmon Survey	·	860 m	MPC · JPL
462110	2007 RA_{38}	—	September 8, 2007	Anderson Mesa	LONEOS	·	930 m	MPC · JPL
462111	2007 RD_{53}	—	September 9, 2007	Kitt Peak	Spacewatch	·	810 m	MPC · JPL
462112	2007 RJ_{66}	—	September 3, 2007	Catalina	CSS	·	2.9 km	MPC · JPL
462113	2007 RC_{77}	—	September 10, 2007	Mount Lemmon	Mount Lemmon Survey	·	2.6 km	MPC · JPL
462114	2007 RK_{81}	—	September 10, 2007	Mount Lemmon	Mount Lemmon Survey	·	2.7 km	MPC · JPL
462115	2007 RT_{113}	—	September 11, 2007	Kitt Peak	Spacewatch	·	2.7 km	MPC · JPL
462116	2007 RD_{117}	—	September 11, 2007	Kitt Peak	Spacewatch	CYB	2.8 km	MPC · JPL
462117	2007 RR_{131}	—	September 12, 2007	Mount Lemmon	Mount Lemmon Survey	MAS	560 m	MPC · JPL
462118	2007 RE_{133}	—	September 15, 2007	Great Shefford	Birtwhistle, P.	·	650 m	MPC · JPL
462119	2007 RG_{139}	—	September 6, 2007	Anderson Mesa	LONEOS	·	800 m	MPC · JPL
462120	2007 RB_{144}	—	September 14, 2007	Socorro	LINEAR	·	2.9 km	MPC · JPL
462121	2007 RJ_{152}	—	August 24, 2007	Kitt Peak	Spacewatch	V	450 m	MPC · JPL
462122	2007 RM_{160}	—	September 12, 2007	Mount Lemmon	Mount Lemmon Survey	·	2.6 km	MPC · JPL
462123	2007 RR_{177}	—	September 10, 2007	Mount Lemmon	Mount Lemmon Survey	·	680 m	MPC · JPL
462124	2007 RS_{184}	—	September 13, 2007	Mount Lemmon	Mount Lemmon Survey	·	3.0 km	MPC · JPL
462125	2007 RG_{190}	—	September 11, 2007	Kitt Peak	Spacewatch	·	2.0 km	MPC · JPL
462126	2007 RX_{191}	—	September 11, 2007	Kitt Peak	Spacewatch	EOS	1.6 km	MPC · JPL
462127	2007 RG_{201}	—	September 13, 2007	Kitt Peak	Spacewatch	·	2.3 km	MPC · JPL
462128	2007 RZ_{228}	—	September 11, 2007	Kitt Peak	Spacewatch	·	640 m	MPC · JPL
462129	2007 RN_{246}	—	March 8, 2005	Mount Lemmon	Mount Lemmon Survey	·	4.4 km	MPC · JPL
462130	2007 RB_{247}	—	September 12, 2007	Mount Lemmon	Mount Lemmon Survey	·	2.1 km	MPC · JPL
462131	2007 RO_{250}	—	September 9, 2007	Kitt Peak	Spacewatch	·	860 m	MPC · JPL
462132	2007 RY_{255}	—	August 11, 2002	Cerro Tololo	Deep Ecliptic Survey	·	2.2 km	MPC · JPL
462133	2007 RH_{309}	—	September 3, 2007	Catalina	CSS	·	620 m	MPC · JPL
462134	2007 RQ_{313}	—	September 11, 2007	Catalina	CSS	T_{j} (2.99)	3.4 km	MPC · JPL
462135	2007 RU_{315}	—	September 12, 2007	Mount Lemmon	Mount Lemmon Survey	·	1.2 km	MPC · JPL
462136	2007 RZ_{321}	—	September 10, 2007	Kitt Peak	Spacewatch	·	2.2 km	MPC · JPL
462137	2007 RS_{322}	—	September 13, 2007	Mount Lemmon	Mount Lemmon Survey	·	650 m	MPC · JPL
462138	2007 SL_{20}	—	September 8, 2007	Mount Lemmon	Mount Lemmon Survey	·	630 m	MPC · JPL
462139	2007 SA_{21}	—	September 25, 2007	Mount Lemmon	Mount Lemmon Survey	·	980 m	MPC · JPL
462140	2007 SU_{22}	—	September 19, 2007	Kitt Peak	Spacewatch	·	820 m	MPC · JPL
462141	2007 TV_{1}	—	October 4, 2007	Mount Lemmon	Mount Lemmon Survey	·	2.8 km	MPC · JPL
462142	2007 TJ_{13}	—	October 8, 2007	Kitt Peak	Spacewatch	·	1.0 km	MPC · JPL
462143	2007 TM_{25}	—	October 4, 2007	Kitt Peak	Spacewatch	·	710 m	MPC · JPL
462144	2007 TW_{29}	—	September 8, 2007	Mount Lemmon	Mount Lemmon Survey	MAS	620 m	MPC · JPL
462145	2007 TM_{42}	—	October 7, 2007	Mount Lemmon	Mount Lemmon Survey	·	3.0 km	MPC · JPL
462146	2007 TO_{52}	—	October 4, 2007	Kitt Peak	Spacewatch	·	810 m	MPC · JPL
462147	2007 TA_{53}	—	October 4, 2007	Kitt Peak	Spacewatch	·	1.1 km	MPC · JPL
462148	2007 TQ_{56}	—	October 4, 2007	Kitt Peak	Spacewatch	MAS	570 m	MPC · JPL
462149	2007 TP_{71}	—	October 7, 2007	Bergisch Gladbach	W. Bickel	H	440 m	MPC · JPL
462150	2007 TW_{73}	—	October 10, 2007	Mount Lemmon	Mount Lemmon Survey	·	1.0 km	MPC · JPL
462151	2007 TU_{97}	—	February 4, 2005	Kitt Peak	Spacewatch	NYS	820 m	MPC · JPL
462152	2007 TF_{103}	—	October 8, 2007	Mount Lemmon	Mount Lemmon Survey	NYS	840 m	MPC · JPL
462153	2007 TB_{114}	—	October 8, 2007	Catalina	CSS	·	1.0 km	MPC · JPL
462154	2007 TV_{118}	—	October 9, 2007	Kitt Peak	Spacewatch	NYS	860 m	MPC · JPL
462155	2007 TW_{122}	—	October 6, 2007	Kitt Peak	Spacewatch	V	500 m	MPC · JPL
462156	2007 TM_{124}	—	October 6, 2007	Kitt Peak	Spacewatch	·	900 m	MPC · JPL
462157	2007 TF_{160}	—	September 10, 2007	Catalina	CSS	·	1.1 km	MPC · JPL
462158	2007 TW_{163}	—	September 8, 2007	Mount Lemmon	Mount Lemmon Survey	·	940 m	MPC · JPL
462159	2007 TL_{167}	—	October 12, 2007	Socorro	LINEAR	·	1.1 km	MPC · JPL
462160	2007 TO_{167}	—	September 14, 2007	Mount Lemmon	Mount Lemmon Survey	·	1.1 km	MPC · JPL
462161	2007 TP_{174}	—	September 9, 2007	Mount Lemmon	Mount Lemmon Survey	·	4.2 km	MPC · JPL
462162	2007 TY_{181}	—	October 8, 2007	Mount Lemmon	Mount Lemmon Survey	·	720 m	MPC · JPL
462163	2007 TF_{188}	—	October 10, 2007	Catalina	CSS	·	3.8 km	MPC · JPL
462164	2007 TR_{192}	—	October 5, 2007	Kitt Peak	Spacewatch	EOS	2.1 km	MPC · JPL
462165	2007 TK_{202}	—	October 8, 2007	Mount Lemmon	Mount Lemmon Survey	·	3.2 km	MPC · JPL
462166	2007 TJ_{226}	—	September 2, 2000	Anderson Mesa	LONEOS	·	820 m	MPC · JPL
462167	2007 TW_{235}	—	September 14, 2007	Mount Lemmon	Mount Lemmon Survey	·	2.9 km	MPC · JPL
462168	2007 TK_{258}	—	October 10, 2007	Mount Lemmon	Mount Lemmon Survey	NYS	640 m	MPC · JPL
462169	2007 TQ_{259}	—	September 14, 2007	Mount Lemmon	Mount Lemmon Survey	·	600 m	MPC · JPL
462170	2007 TC_{268}	—	September 25, 2007	Mount Lemmon	Mount Lemmon Survey	·	1.0 km	MPC · JPL
462171	2007 TM_{268}	—	September 14, 2007	Mount Lemmon	Mount Lemmon Survey	LIX	3.5 km	MPC · JPL
462172	2007 TZ_{272}	—	October 9, 2007	Kitt Peak	Spacewatch	·	700 m	MPC · JPL
462173	2007 TD_{273}	—	October 9, 2007	Kitt Peak	Spacewatch	·	1.4 km	MPC · JPL
462174	2007 TW_{294}	—	September 14, 2007	Kitt Peak	Spacewatch	H	400 m	MPC · JPL
462175	2007 TR_{319}	—	September 14, 2007	Mount Lemmon	Mount Lemmon Survey	MAS	680 m	MPC · JPL
462176	2007 TC_{334}	—	October 11, 2007	Kitt Peak	Spacewatch	·	820 m	MPC · JPL
462177	2007 TQ_{356}	—	September 19, 2007	Kitt Peak	Spacewatch	·	910 m	MPC · JPL
462178	2007 TL_{363}	—	October 15, 2007	Mount Lemmon	Mount Lemmon Survey	NYS	1.0 km	MPC · JPL
462179	2007 TK_{367}	—	October 10, 2007	Catalina	CSS	·	1.1 km	MPC · JPL
462180	2007 TL_{368}	—	September 20, 2007	Catalina	CSS	·	1.1 km	MPC · JPL
462181	2007 TG_{381}	—	October 14, 2007	Kitt Peak	Spacewatch	·	1.0 km	MPC · JPL
462182	2007 TT_{391}	—	October 7, 2007	Mount Lemmon	Mount Lemmon Survey	·	3.4 km	MPC · JPL
462183	2007 TD_{395}	—	October 15, 2007	Kitt Peak	Spacewatch	V	590 m	MPC · JPL
462184	2007 TY_{442}	—	October 10, 2007	Catalina	CSS	·	850 m	MPC · JPL
462185	2007 TB_{444}	—	October 4, 2007	Kitt Peak	Spacewatch	·	950 m	MPC · JPL
462186	2007 TR_{446}	—	October 10, 2007	Catalina	CSS	·	940 m	MPC · JPL
462187	2007 TX_{450}	—	October 9, 2007	Kitt Peak	Spacewatch	NYS	1.2 km	MPC · JPL
462188	2007 UF_{11}	—	October 10, 2007	Catalina	CSS	·	1.3 km	MPC · JPL
462189	2007 UU_{21}	—	October 16, 2007	Kitt Peak	Spacewatch	ERI	1.3 km	MPC · JPL
462190	2007 UZ_{33}	—	October 10, 2007	Catalina	CSS	·	1.1 km	MPC · JPL
462191	2007 UR_{45}	—	September 25, 2007	Mount Lemmon	Mount Lemmon Survey	·	870 m	MPC · JPL
462192	2007 US_{87}	—	October 30, 2007	Kitt Peak	Spacewatch	·	990 m	MPC · JPL
462193	2007 UF_{97}	—	October 10, 2007	Kitt Peak	Spacewatch	·	860 m	MPC · JPL
462194	2007 UD_{120}	—	September 14, 2007	Mount Lemmon	Mount Lemmon Survey	V	470 m	MPC · JPL
462195	2007 UY_{131}	—	October 18, 2007	Kitt Peak	Spacewatch	·	890 m	MPC · JPL
462196	2007 US_{139}	—	October 24, 2007	Mount Lemmon	Mount Lemmon Survey	·	5.3 km	MPC · JPL
462197	2007 UA_{142}	—	October 24, 2007	Mount Lemmon	Mount Lemmon Survey	MAS	590 m	MPC · JPL
462198	2007 VV_{2}	—	October 30, 2007	Mount Lemmon	Mount Lemmon Survey	·	1.1 km	MPC · JPL
462199	2007 VX_{27}	—	November 2, 2007	Kitt Peak	Spacewatch	·	920 m	MPC · JPL
462200	2007 VZ_{48}	—	November 1, 2007	Kitt Peak	Spacewatch	·	800 m	MPC · JPL

== 462201–462300 ==
back to top

Designation			Discovery			Properties		Ref
Permanent	Provisional	Named after	Date	Site	Discoverer(s)	Category	Diam.	Ref
462201	2007 VF_{58}	—	August 22, 2003	Socorro	LINEAR	·	970 m	MPC · JPL
462202	2007 VG_{62}	—	November 1, 2007	Kitt Peak	Spacewatch	·	950 m	MPC · JPL
462203	2007 VU_{85}	—	October 8, 2007	Catalina	CSS	·	990 m	MPC · JPL
462204	2007 VZ_{94}	—	October 9, 2007	Kitt Peak	Spacewatch	·	750 m	MPC · JPL
462205	2007 VQ_{118}	—	October 20, 2007	Mount Lemmon	Mount Lemmon Survey	MAS	600 m	MPC · JPL
462206	2007 VP_{126}	—	September 10, 2007	Mount Lemmon	Mount Lemmon Survey	NYS	1.2 km	MPC · JPL
462207	2007 VX_{138}	—	October 9, 2007	XuYi	PMO NEO Survey Program	·	880 m	MPC · JPL
462208	2007 VF_{145}	—	November 4, 2007	Kitt Peak	Spacewatch	NYS	820 m	MPC · JPL
462209	2007 VU_{159}	—	November 5, 2007	Kitt Peak	Spacewatch	·	900 m	MPC · JPL
462210	2007 VR_{164}	—	November 5, 2007	Kitt Peak	Spacewatch	·	860 m	MPC · JPL
462211	2007 VG_{181}	—	November 7, 2007	Catalina	CSS	·	1.4 km	MPC · JPL
462212	2007 VO_{195}	—	October 16, 2007	Mount Lemmon	Mount Lemmon Survey	·	620 m	MPC · JPL
462213	2007 VJ_{201}	—	November 9, 2007	Mount Lemmon	Mount Lemmon Survey	·	580 m	MPC · JPL
462214	2007 VK_{220}	—	November 9, 2007	Kitt Peak	Spacewatch	V	660 m	MPC · JPL
462215	2007 VS_{252}	—	October 9, 2007	XuYi	PMO NEO Survey Program	·	880 m	MPC · JPL
462216	2007 VK_{253}	—	November 7, 2007	Catalina	CSS	·	1.2 km	MPC · JPL
462217	2007 VQ_{260}	—	November 15, 2007	Mount Lemmon	Mount Lemmon Survey	·	1.7 km	MPC · JPL
462218	2007 VG_{269}	—	November 14, 2007	Socorro	LINEAR	·	630 m	MPC · JPL
462219	2007 VW_{321}	—	November 8, 2007	Catalina	CSS	·	1.2 km	MPC · JPL
462220	2007 WQ_{6}	—	September 10, 2007	Mount Lemmon	Mount Lemmon Survey	·	1.0 km	MPC · JPL
462221	2007 WA_{33}	—	November 19, 2007	Mount Lemmon	Mount Lemmon Survey	(260) · CYB	5.3 km	MPC · JPL
462222	2007 WW_{50}	—	November 20, 2007	Mount Lemmon	Mount Lemmon Survey	·	970 m	MPC · JPL
462223	2007 XU_{17}	—	November 19, 2007	Kitt Peak	Spacewatch	·	1.5 km	MPC · JPL
462224	2007 XL_{24}	—	December 13, 2007	Socorro	LINEAR	H	600 m	MPC · JPL
462225	2007 XW_{38}	—	December 13, 2007	Socorro	LINEAR	PHO	1.1 km	MPC · JPL
462226	2007 XG_{56}	—	December 3, 2007	Kitt Peak	Spacewatch	·	1.6 km	MPC · JPL
462227	2007 YU_{43}	—	December 30, 2007	Kitt Peak	Spacewatch	MAS	690 m	MPC · JPL
462228	2007 YZ_{44}	—	December 18, 2007	Kitt Peak	Spacewatch	·	1.2 km	MPC · JPL
462229	2007 YG_{69}	—	December 20, 2007	Kitt Peak	Spacewatch	NYS	890 m	MPC · JPL
462230	2008 AH_{17}	—	January 10, 2008	Kitt Peak	Spacewatch	·	770 m	MPC · JPL
462231	2008 AC_{18}	—	January 10, 2008	Catalina	CSS	H	650 m	MPC · JPL
462232	2008 AN_{34}	—	December 31, 2007	Mount Lemmon	Mount Lemmon Survey	NYS	840 m	MPC · JPL
462233	2008 AV_{68}	—	November 19, 2007	Mount Lemmon	Mount Lemmon Survey	·	1.4 km	MPC · JPL
462234	2008 AD_{102}	—	January 12, 2008	Kitt Peak	Spacewatch	H	420 m	MPC · JPL
462235	2008 AZ_{109}	—	January 15, 2008	Kitt Peak	Spacewatch	3:2	4.7 km	MPC · JPL
462236	2008 AK_{118}	—	January 15, 2008	Mount Lemmon	Mount Lemmon Survey	·	940 m	MPC · JPL
462237	2008 BO_{53}	—	January 30, 2008	Kitt Peak	Spacewatch	3:2 · SHU	5.3 km	MPC · JPL
462238	2008 CN_{1}	—	February 2, 2008	Catalina	CSS	ATE · PHA · critical	230 m	MPC · JPL
462239	2008 CY_{39}	—	February 2, 2008	Mount Lemmon	Mount Lemmon Survey	·	1.3 km	MPC · JPL
462240	2008 CV_{42}	—	February 2, 2008	Kitt Peak	Spacewatch	NYS	1.1 km	MPC · JPL
462241	2008 CP_{66}	—	February 8, 2008	Mount Lemmon	Mount Lemmon Survey	NYS	1.0 km	MPC · JPL
462242	2008 CU_{80}	—	November 20, 2007	Mount Lemmon	Mount Lemmon Survey	3:2	4.7 km	MPC · JPL
462243	2008 CS_{83}	—	February 7, 2008	Kitt Peak	Spacewatch	H	510 m	MPC · JPL
462244	2008 CV_{84}	—	February 7, 2008	Kitt Peak	Spacewatch	·	910 m	MPC · JPL
462245	2008 CU_{123}	—	February 7, 2008	Mount Lemmon	Mount Lemmon Survey	·	1.1 km	MPC · JPL
462246	2008 CT_{126}	—	February 8, 2008	Kitt Peak	Spacewatch	·	920 m	MPC · JPL
462247	2008 CP_{136}	—	January 14, 2008	Kitt Peak	Spacewatch	·	1.2 km	MPC · JPL
462248	2008 CC_{146}	—	February 9, 2008	Kitt Peak	Spacewatch	H	430 m	MPC · JPL
462249	2008 CO_{146}	—	February 9, 2008	Kitt Peak	Spacewatch	·	1.0 km	MPC · JPL
462250	2008 CC_{170}	—	February 12, 2008	Mount Lemmon	Mount Lemmon Survey	·	890 m	MPC · JPL
462251	2008 CU_{189}	—	February 14, 2008	Catalina	CSS	·	1.1 km	MPC · JPL
462252	2008 CB_{211}	—	February 2, 2008	Mount Lemmon	Mount Lemmon Survey	·	1.6 km	MPC · JPL
462253	2008 DA_{19}	—	February 27, 2008	Kitt Peak	Spacewatch	V	620 m	MPC · JPL
462254	2008 DR_{22}	—	February 29, 2008	Catalina	CSS	H	580 m	MPC · JPL
462255	2008 DU_{27}	—	January 20, 2008	Kitt Peak	Spacewatch	·	1.2 km	MPC · JPL
462256	2008 DG_{37}	—	February 13, 2008	Mount Lemmon	Mount Lemmon Survey	·	1.2 km	MPC · JPL
462257	2008 DG_{72}	—	February 26, 2008	Mount Lemmon	Mount Lemmon Survey	·	1.2 km	MPC · JPL
462258	2008 DJ_{85}	—	February 27, 2008	Mount Lemmon	Mount Lemmon Survey	·	1.3 km	MPC · JPL
462259	2008 EU_{3}	—	January 30, 2008	Mount Lemmon	Mount Lemmon Survey	EUN	1.1 km	MPC · JPL
462260	2008 EC_{23}	—	March 3, 2008	Vail-Jarnac	Jarnac	H	520 m	MPC · JPL
462261	2008 EX_{58}	—	February 2, 2008	Mount Lemmon	Mount Lemmon Survey	·	770 m	MPC · JPL
462262	2008 ER_{59}	—	February 2, 2008	Mount Lemmon	Mount Lemmon Survey	(5)	960 m	MPC · JPL
462263	2008 EY_{70}	—	March 6, 2008	Mount Lemmon	Mount Lemmon Survey	3:2	3.7 km	MPC · JPL
462264	2008 EO_{73}	—	February 28, 2008	Mount Lemmon	Mount Lemmon Survey	H	520 m	MPC · JPL
462265	2008 EP_{73}	—	February 28, 2008	Kitt Peak	Spacewatch	·	1.2 km	MPC · JPL
462266	2008 EF_{91}	—	March 1, 2008	Anderson Mesa	LONEOS	H	510 m	MPC · JPL
462267	2008 EH_{116}	—	March 8, 2008	Kitt Peak	Spacewatch	·	830 m	MPC · JPL
462268	2008 EC_{117}	—	March 8, 2008	Kitt Peak	Spacewatch	·	920 m	MPC · JPL
462269	2008 EZ_{127}	—	February 12, 2008	Kitt Peak	Spacewatch	·	770 m	MPC · JPL
462270	2008 EO_{130}	—	March 11, 2008	Kitt Peak	Spacewatch	H	530 m	MPC · JPL
462271	2008 ES_{131}	—	February 28, 2008	Kitt Peak	Spacewatch	(5)	1.1 km	MPC · JPL
462272	2008 ER_{136}	—	March 11, 2008	Kitt Peak	Spacewatch	·	960 m	MPC · JPL
462273	2008 EA_{148}	—	March 1, 2008	Kitt Peak	Spacewatch	·	740 m	MPC · JPL
462274	2008 EA_{151}	—	March 5, 2008	Mount Lemmon	Mount Lemmon Survey	·	1.4 km	MPC · JPL
462275	2008 EB_{151}	—	March 10, 2008	Kitt Peak	Spacewatch	·	1.0 km	MPC · JPL
462276	2008 EF_{154}	—	March 15, 2008	Mount Lemmon	Mount Lemmon Survey	·	1.6 km	MPC · JPL
462277	2008 EB_{159}	—	March 13, 2008	Kitt Peak	Spacewatch	·	1.3 km	MPC · JPL
462278	2008 EW_{162}	—	March 15, 2008	Kitt Peak	Spacewatch	(5)	1.0 km	MPC · JPL
462279	2008 EZ_{167}	—	March 10, 2008	Kitt Peak	Spacewatch	·	670 m	MPC · JPL
462280	2008 FS	—	February 8, 2008	Kitt Peak	Spacewatch	·	1.2 km	MPC · JPL
462281	2008 FR_{9}	—	February 7, 2008	Mount Lemmon	Mount Lemmon Survey	·	800 m	MPC · JPL
462282	2008 FM_{12}	—	March 26, 2008	Mount Lemmon	Mount Lemmon Survey	·	710 m	MPC · JPL
462283	2008 FW_{21}	—	March 27, 2008	Kitt Peak	Spacewatch	·	1.0 km	MPC · JPL
462284	2008 FV_{27}	—	March 27, 2008	Kitt Peak	Spacewatch	H	520 m	MPC · JPL
462285	2008 FG_{28}	—	March 3, 2008	Kitt Peak	Spacewatch	H	580 m	MPC · JPL
462286	2008 FC_{39}	—	March 5, 2008	Mount Lemmon	Mount Lemmon Survey	MAR	1.4 km	MPC · JPL
462287	2008 FY_{49}	—	March 28, 2008	Mount Lemmon	Mount Lemmon Survey	·	1.6 km	MPC · JPL
462288	2008 FU_{53}	—	March 28, 2008	Mount Lemmon	Mount Lemmon Survey	·	890 m	MPC · JPL
462289	2008 FH_{54}	—	March 28, 2008	Mount Lemmon	Mount Lemmon Survey	·	1.0 km	MPC · JPL
462290	2008 FG_{55}	—	March 28, 2008	Mount Lemmon	Mount Lemmon Survey	·	1.2 km	MPC · JPL
462291	2008 FU_{63}	—	March 27, 2008	Kitt Peak	Spacewatch	·	1.1 km	MPC · JPL
462292	2008 FZ_{64}	—	March 28, 2008	Kitt Peak	Spacewatch	·	1.1 km	MPC · JPL
462293	2008 FZ_{72}	—	March 10, 2008	Mount Lemmon	Mount Lemmon Survey	(5)	960 m	MPC · JPL
462294	2008 FF_{73}	—	March 30, 2008	Kitt Peak	Spacewatch	·	770 m	MPC · JPL
462295	2008 FX_{88}	—	March 28, 2008	Mount Lemmon	Mount Lemmon Survey	H	550 m	MPC · JPL
462296	2008 FE_{97}	—	March 29, 2008	Catalina	CSS	H	640 m	MPC · JPL
462297	2008 FJ_{112}	—	March 30, 2008	Kitt Peak	Spacewatch	H	560 m	MPC · JPL
462298	2008 FQ_{113}	—	March 31, 2008	Kitt Peak	Spacewatch	·	1.0 km	MPC · JPL
462299	2008 FD_{126}	—	March 26, 2008	Mount Lemmon	Mount Lemmon Survey	·	1.5 km	MPC · JPL
462300	2008 FE_{135}	—	March 12, 2008	Kitt Peak	Spacewatch	·	1.1 km	MPC · JPL

== 462301–462400 ==
back to top

Designation			Discovery			Properties		Ref
Permanent	Provisional	Named after	Date	Site	Discoverer(s)	Category	Diam.	Ref
462301	2008 FK_{135}	—	March 31, 2008	Mount Lemmon	Mount Lemmon Survey	·	720 m	MPC · JPL
462302	2008 GU_{5}	—	January 30, 2008	Mount Lemmon	Mount Lemmon Survey	·	910 m	MPC · JPL
462303	2008 GV_{15}	—	April 3, 2008	Mount Lemmon	Mount Lemmon Survey	H	490 m	MPC · JPL
462304	2008 GJ_{46}	—	March 27, 2008	Kitt Peak	Spacewatch	·	1.2 km	MPC · JPL
462305	2008 GW_{69}	—	April 6, 2008	Mount Lemmon	Mount Lemmon Survey	·	1.5 km	MPC · JPL
462306	2008 GX_{75}	—	March 12, 2008	Kitt Peak	Spacewatch	·	1.0 km	MPC · JPL
462307	2008 GR_{84}	—	April 8, 2008	Mount Lemmon	Mount Lemmon Survey	·	1.6 km	MPC · JPL
462308	2008 GM_{89}	—	February 11, 2008	Mount Lemmon	Mount Lemmon Survey	·	1.1 km	MPC · JPL
462309	2008 GR_{91}	—	April 6, 2008	Mount Lemmon	Mount Lemmon Survey	·	1.0 km	MPC · JPL
462310	2008 GO_{97}	—	April 4, 2008	Kitt Peak	Spacewatch	·	1.3 km	MPC · JPL
462311	2008 GY_{102}	—	April 10, 2008	Kitt Peak	Spacewatch	·	1.0 km	MPC · JPL
462312	2008 GQ_{121}	—	March 31, 2008	Kitt Peak	Spacewatch	KON	1.6 km	MPC · JPL
462313	2008 GN_{122}	—	November 18, 2006	Kitt Peak	Spacewatch	·	1.6 km	MPC · JPL
462314	2008 GR_{130}	—	April 6, 2008	Kitt Peak	Spacewatch	EUN	770 m	MPC · JPL
462315	2008 GG_{145}	—	April 30, 2004	Kitt Peak	Spacewatch	·	970 m	MPC · JPL
462316	2008 HQ_{8}	—	April 3, 2008	Mount Lemmon	Mount Lemmon Survey	·	1.3 km	MPC · JPL
462317	2008 HO_{16}	—	April 6, 2008	Mount Lemmon	Mount Lemmon Survey	·	1.5 km	MPC · JPL
462318	2008 HS_{19}	—	January 17, 2007	Kitt Peak	Spacewatch	·	1.8 km	MPC · JPL
462319	2008 HA_{21}	—	April 26, 2008	Kitt Peak	Spacewatch	·	1.1 km	MPC · JPL
462320	2008 HM_{27}	—	April 27, 2008	Kitt Peak	Spacewatch	·	2.1 km	MPC · JPL
462321	2008 HR_{29}	—	April 28, 2008	Mount Lemmon	Mount Lemmon Survey	·	1.3 km	MPC · JPL
462322	2008 HW_{34}	—	April 27, 2008	Mount Lemmon	Mount Lemmon Survey	MAR	1.3 km	MPC · JPL
462323	2008 HG_{46}	—	April 7, 2008	Kitt Peak	Spacewatch	·	1.2 km	MPC · JPL
462324	2008 HD_{56}	—	April 29, 2008	Kitt Peak	Spacewatch	BRG	1.2 km	MPC · JPL
462325	2008 HJ_{57}	—	April 6, 2008	Kitt Peak	Spacewatch	·	1.1 km	MPC · JPL
462326	2008 JW_{10}	—	April 6, 2008	Mount Lemmon	Mount Lemmon Survey	·	1.1 km	MPC · JPL
462327	2008 JO_{11}	—	October 8, 2005	Kitt Peak	Spacewatch	(5)	1.1 km	MPC · JPL
462328	2008 JY_{11}	—	May 3, 2008	Kitt Peak	Spacewatch	·	1.7 km	MPC · JPL
462329	2008 JZ_{30}	—	May 14, 2008	Kitt Peak	Spacewatch	AMO	720 m	MPC · JPL
462330	2008 JK_{33}	—	April 3, 2008	Mount Lemmon	Mount Lemmon Survey	·	1.4 km	MPC · JPL
462331	2008 KG_{4}	—	May 27, 2008	Kitt Peak	Spacewatch	·	1.2 km	MPC · JPL
462332	2008 KR_{5}	—	May 28, 2008	Kitt Peak	Spacewatch	·	1.3 km	MPC · JPL
462333	2008 KW_{29}	—	April 30, 2008	Kitt Peak	Spacewatch	EUN	1.0 km	MPC · JPL
462334	2008 KO_{34}	—	May 31, 2008	Mount Lemmon	Mount Lemmon Survey	MAR	1.1 km	MPC · JPL
462335	2008 KP_{34}	—	May 15, 2008	Mount Lemmon	Mount Lemmon Survey	EUN	960 m	MPC · JPL
462336	2008 KS_{39}	—	May 30, 2008	Kitt Peak	Spacewatch	·	1.1 km	MPC · JPL
462337	2008 LR_{3}	—	May 15, 2008	Mount Lemmon	Mount Lemmon Survey	·	1.0 km	MPC · JPL
462338	2008 NF_{2}	—	July 9, 2008	Dauban	Kugel, F.	·	2.9 km	MPC · JPL
462339	2008 NV_{3}	—	July 12, 2008	La Sagra	OAM	·	2.1 km	MPC · JPL
462340	2008 OR_{22}	—	July 29, 2008	Kitt Peak	Spacewatch	·	1.4 km	MPC · JPL
462341	2008 PY_{4}	—	August 4, 2008	La Sagra	OAM	·	1.2 km	MPC · JPL
462342	2008 PC_{22}	—	March 3, 2006	Kitt Peak	Spacewatch	KOR	1.3 km	MPC · JPL
462343	2008 QY_{8}	—	August 21, 2008	Kitt Peak	Spacewatch	EUN	1.3 km	MPC · JPL
462344	2008 QA_{13}	—	August 26, 2008	La Sagra	OAM	TIR	2.9 km	MPC · JPL
462345	2008 QQ_{17}	—	August 27, 2008	La Sagra	OAM	·	1.4 km	MPC · JPL
462346	2008 QD_{26}	—	August 29, 2008	La Sagra	OAM	ADE	2.5 km	MPC · JPL
462347	2008 QK_{44}	—	August 23, 2008	Siding Spring	SSS	·	2.3 km	MPC · JPL
462348	2008 QO_{46}	—	August 26, 2008	Socorro	LINEAR	·	1.9 km	MPC · JPL
462349	2008 RZ_{2}	—	September 2, 2008	Kitt Peak	Spacewatch	·	2.5 km	MPC · JPL
462350	2008 RP_{29}	—	September 2, 2008	Kitt Peak	Spacewatch	·	1.8 km	MPC · JPL
462351	2008 RG_{32}	—	September 2, 2008	Kitt Peak	Spacewatch	·	1.9 km	MPC · JPL
462352	2008 RF_{39}	—	September 2, 2008	Kitt Peak	Spacewatch	·	1.7 km	MPC · JPL
462353	2008 RV_{41}	—	September 2, 2008	Kitt Peak	Spacewatch	EMA	4.1 km	MPC · JPL
462354	2008 RY_{86}	—	September 5, 2008	Kitt Peak	Spacewatch	·	1.8 km	MPC · JPL
462355	2008 RG_{104}	—	November 26, 2003	Kitt Peak	Spacewatch	·	2.8 km	MPC · JPL
462356	2008 RL_{109}	—	September 2, 2008	Kitt Peak	Spacewatch	·	2.3 km	MPC · JPL
462357	2008 RU_{109}	—	September 2, 2008	Kitt Peak	Spacewatch	KOR	1.3 km	MPC · JPL
462358	2008 RK_{113}	—	September 5, 2008	Kitt Peak	Spacewatch	·	1.5 km	MPC · JPL
462359	2008 RG_{114}	—	September 6, 2008	Kitt Peak	Spacewatch	·	1.5 km	MPC · JPL
462360	2008 RL_{123}	—	September 4, 2003	Kitt Peak	Spacewatch	·	1.8 km	MPC · JPL
462361	2008 RF_{125}	—	September 7, 2008	Mount Lemmon	Mount Lemmon Survey	KOR	1.3 km	MPC · JPL
462362	2008 RS_{127}	—	September 6, 2008	Mount Lemmon	Mount Lemmon Survey	·	1.8 km	MPC · JPL
462363	2008 RK_{128}	—	September 7, 2008	Mount Lemmon	Mount Lemmon Survey	·	3.6 km	MPC · JPL
462364	2008 RY_{137}	—	September 5, 2008	Kitt Peak	Spacewatch	·	2.7 km	MPC · JPL
462365	2008 SZ_{22}	—	September 4, 2008	Kitt Peak	Spacewatch	EOS	1.4 km	MPC · JPL
462366	2008 SJ_{47}	—	September 20, 2008	Kitt Peak	Spacewatch	THM	2.4 km	MPC · JPL
462367	2008 SE_{56}	—	September 20, 2008	Kitt Peak	Spacewatch	·	2.0 km	MPC · JPL
462368	2008 SK_{60}	—	September 20, 2008	Mount Lemmon	Mount Lemmon Survey	·	2.9 km	MPC · JPL
462369	2008 SP_{61}	—	August 7, 2008	Kitt Peak	Spacewatch	·	2.2 km	MPC · JPL
462370	2008 SO_{96}	—	September 9, 2008	Mount Lemmon	Mount Lemmon Survey	·	2.2 km	MPC · JPL
462371	2008 SX_{99}	—	September 21, 2008	Kitt Peak	Spacewatch	EOS	2.2 km	MPC · JPL
462372	2008 ST_{101}	—	September 21, 2008	Kitt Peak	Spacewatch	·	2.5 km	MPC · JPL
462373	2008 SG_{104}	—	September 21, 2008	Kitt Peak	Spacewatch	·	2.6 km	MPC · JPL
462374	2008 SV_{106}	—	September 21, 2008	Kitt Peak	Spacewatch	THM	1.9 km	MPC · JPL
462375	2008 SH_{108}	—	September 22, 2008	Mount Lemmon	Mount Lemmon Survey	JUN	880 m	MPC · JPL
462376	2008 SX_{110}	—	September 22, 2008	Kitt Peak	Spacewatch	EOS	2.2 km	MPC · JPL
462377	2008 SN_{114}	—	September 22, 2008	Kitt Peak	Spacewatch	·	3.5 km	MPC · JPL
462378	2008 SH_{116}	—	September 22, 2008	Kitt Peak	Spacewatch	EOS	1.6 km	MPC · JPL
462379	2008 SN_{131}	—	September 22, 2008	Kitt Peak	Spacewatch	·	790 m	MPC · JPL
462380	2008 SD_{134}	—	September 9, 2008	Mount Lemmon	Mount Lemmon Survey	·	1.6 km	MPC · JPL
462381	2008 SM_{136}	—	September 23, 2008	Kitt Peak	Spacewatch	·	2.4 km	MPC · JPL
462382	2008 SW_{140}	—	September 6, 2008	Mount Lemmon	Mount Lemmon Survey	·	2.6 km	MPC · JPL
462383	2008 SD_{154}	—	September 3, 2008	Kitt Peak	Spacewatch	EOS	1.9 km	MPC · JPL
462384	2008 SG_{160}	—	September 24, 2008	Socorro	LINEAR	·	1.7 km	MPC · JPL
462385	2008 SV_{161}	—	September 2, 2008	Kitt Peak	Spacewatch	·	2.4 km	MPC · JPL
462386	2008 SR_{175}	—	September 23, 2008	Kitt Peak	Spacewatch	·	3.5 km	MPC · JPL
462387	2008 SG_{178}	—	September 23, 2008	Kitt Peak	Spacewatch	·	3.2 km	MPC · JPL
462388	2008 ST_{180}	—	September 24, 2008	Kitt Peak	Spacewatch	·	1.7 km	MPC · JPL
462389	2008 SA_{187}	—	September 25, 2008	Kitt Peak	Spacewatch	·	2.1 km	MPC · JPL
462390	2008 SB_{188}	—	September 25, 2008	Kitt Peak	Spacewatch	·	2.0 km	MPC · JPL
462391	2008 SZ_{196}	—	September 25, 2008	Kitt Peak	Spacewatch	EOS	1.7 km	MPC · JPL
462392	2008 SC_{208}	—	September 27, 2008	Catalina	CSS	·	2.5 km	MPC · JPL
462393	2008 SY_{221}	—	September 3, 2008	Kitt Peak	Spacewatch	·	2.0 km	MPC · JPL
462394	2008 SS_{222}	—	September 3, 2008	Kitt Peak	Spacewatch	·	2.1 km	MPC · JPL
462395	2008 SM_{224}	—	September 26, 2008	Kitt Peak	Spacewatch	HYG	2.3 km	MPC · JPL
462396	2008 SU_{225}	—	September 26, 2008	Kitt Peak	Spacewatch	T_{j} (2.99)	5.0 km	MPC · JPL
462397	2008 SH_{227}	—	September 5, 2008	Kitt Peak	Spacewatch	·	2.3 km	MPC · JPL
462398	2008 SR_{231}	—	September 28, 2008	Mount Lemmon	Mount Lemmon Survey	·	2.9 km	MPC · JPL
462399	2008 SW_{245}	—	September 29, 2008	Kitt Peak	Spacewatch	·	3.5 km	MPC · JPL
462400	2008 SD_{262}	—	September 24, 2008	Kitt Peak	Spacewatch	·	1.5 km	MPC · JPL

== 462401–462500 ==
back to top

Designation			Discovery			Properties		Ref
Permanent	Provisional	Named after	Date	Site	Discoverer(s)	Category	Diam.	Ref
462401	2008 SU_{263}	—	September 24, 2008	Mount Lemmon	Mount Lemmon Survey	·	4.0 km	MPC · JPL
462402	2008 SA_{270}	—	September 23, 2008	Kitt Peak	Spacewatch	·	3.4 km	MPC · JPL
462403	2008 SW_{284}	—	September 25, 2008	Kitt Peak	Spacewatch	·	2.7 km	MPC · JPL
462404	2008 SG_{289}	—	September 25, 2008	Kitt Peak	Spacewatch	·	1.7 km	MPC · JPL
462405	2008 SL_{293}	—	September 22, 2008	Catalina	CSS	·	3.9 km	MPC · JPL
462406	2008 SO_{296}	—	September 29, 2008	Catalina	CSS	·	2.8 km	MPC · JPL
462407	2008 SQ_{298}	—	September 21, 2008	Mount Lemmon	Mount Lemmon Survey	·	2.8 km	MPC · JPL
462408	2008 SQ_{302}	—	September 23, 2008	Kitt Peak	Spacewatch	·	2.7 km	MPC · JPL
462409	2008 SS_{303}	—	September 24, 2008	Mount Lemmon	Mount Lemmon Survey	VER	3.1 km	MPC · JPL
462410	2008 SN_{306}	—	September 28, 2008	Mount Lemmon	Mount Lemmon Survey	·	3.9 km	MPC · JPL
462411	2008 TL_{4}	—	October 1, 2008	La Sagra	OAM	·	1.8 km	MPC · JPL
462412	2008 TR_{4}	—	October 1, 2008	La Sagra	OAM	EOS	1.7 km	MPC · JPL
462413	2008 TH_{5}	—	October 1, 2008	La Sagra	OAM	·	2.8 km	MPC · JPL
462414	2008 TR_{7}	—	September 3, 2008	Kitt Peak	Spacewatch	·	2.3 km	MPC · JPL
462415	2008 TT_{13}	—	September 10, 2008	Kitt Peak	Spacewatch	·	2.3 km	MPC · JPL
462416	2008 TG_{14}	—	September 5, 2008	Kitt Peak	Spacewatch	·	2.1 km	MPC · JPL
462417	2008 TX_{16}	—	September 22, 2008	Mount Lemmon	Mount Lemmon Survey	·	2.5 km	MPC · JPL
462418	2008 TA_{31}	—	September 20, 2008	Kitt Peak	Spacewatch	·	2.8 km	MPC · JPL
462419	2008 TG_{36}	—	August 24, 2008	Kitt Peak	Spacewatch	·	2.8 km	MPC · JPL
462420	2008 TG_{64}	—	September 22, 2008	Mount Lemmon	Mount Lemmon Survey	·	1.5 km	MPC · JPL
462421	2008 TM_{73}	—	October 2, 2008	Kitt Peak	Spacewatch	·	3.4 km	MPC · JPL
462422	2008 TH_{83}	—	October 3, 2008	Kitt Peak	Spacewatch	LIX	2.7 km	MPC · JPL
462423	2008 TH_{86}	—	September 4, 2008	Kitt Peak	Spacewatch	·	2.6 km	MPC · JPL
462424	2008 TC_{104}	—	October 6, 2008	Kitt Peak	Spacewatch	·	2.6 km	MPC · JPL
462425	2008 TG_{104}	—	September 26, 2008	Kitt Peak	Spacewatch	·	2.6 km	MPC · JPL
462426	2008 TY_{113}	—	September 23, 2008	Kitt Peak	Spacewatch	·	2.3 km	MPC · JPL
462427	2008 TG_{127}	—	October 8, 2008	Mount Lemmon	Mount Lemmon Survey	·	2.3 km	MPC · JPL
462428	2008 TE_{130}	—	October 8, 2008	Mount Lemmon	Mount Lemmon Survey	·	3.3 km	MPC · JPL
462429	2008 TM_{130}	—	October 8, 2008	Mount Lemmon	Mount Lemmon Survey	·	3.6 km	MPC · JPL
462430	2008 TY_{135}	—	September 22, 2008	Kitt Peak	Spacewatch	HYG	2.3 km	MPC · JPL
462431	2008 TE_{136}	—	September 22, 2008	Kitt Peak	Spacewatch	·	2.6 km	MPC · JPL
462432	2008 TH_{139}	—	October 8, 2008	Mount Lemmon	Mount Lemmon Survey	·	3.5 km	MPC · JPL
462433	2008 TJ_{139}	—	October 8, 2008	Mount Lemmon	Mount Lemmon Survey	EOS	3.6 km	MPC · JPL
462434	2008 TS_{162}	—	October 1, 2008	Catalina	CSS	·	4.0 km	MPC · JPL
462435	2008 TQ_{171}	—	October 6, 2008	Mount Lemmon	Mount Lemmon Survey	·	2.5 km	MPC · JPL
462436	2008 TA_{175}	—	October 8, 2008	Kitt Peak	Spacewatch	·	1.5 km	MPC · JPL
462437	2008 TO_{175}	—	October 9, 2008	Kitt Peak	Spacewatch	·	2.5 km	MPC · JPL
462438	2008 TQ_{175}	—	September 1, 2008	Siding Spring	SSS	·	3.9 km	MPC · JPL
462439	2008 TV_{182}	—	October 2, 2008	Kitt Peak	Spacewatch	·	2.1 km	MPC · JPL
462440	2008 TT_{188}	—	October 10, 2008	Mount Lemmon	Mount Lemmon Survey	TIR	2.6 km	MPC · JPL
462441	2008 UW_{10}	—	September 2, 2008	Kitt Peak	Spacewatch	·	2.7 km	MPC · JPL
462442	2008 UY_{59}	—	October 21, 2008	Kitt Peak	Spacewatch	·	3.3 km	MPC · JPL
462443	2008 UN_{63}	—	September 9, 2008	Mount Lemmon	Mount Lemmon Survey	·	680 m	MPC · JPL
462444	2008 UR_{63}	—	October 21, 2008	Kitt Peak	Spacewatch	·	2.2 km	MPC · JPL
462445	2008 UL_{81}	—	October 22, 2008	Kitt Peak	Spacewatch	·	2.9 km	MPC · JPL
462446	2008 UR_{102}	—	October 20, 2008	Kitt Peak	Spacewatch	·	500 m	MPC · JPL
462447	2008 UX_{110}	—	September 28, 2008	Mount Lemmon	Mount Lemmon Survey	·	2.8 km	MPC · JPL
462448	2008 UX_{113}	—	October 22, 2008	Kitt Peak	Spacewatch	·	3.0 km	MPC · JPL
462449	2008 UY_{113}	—	October 22, 2008	Kitt Peak	Spacewatch	·	3.9 km	MPC · JPL
462450	2008 UR_{114}	—	October 9, 2008	Kitt Peak	Spacewatch	·	2.1 km	MPC · JPL
462451	2008 UY_{119}	—	October 22, 2008	Kitt Peak	Spacewatch	·	2.6 km	MPC · JPL
462452	2008 UR_{120}	—	October 22, 2008	Kitt Peak	Spacewatch	·	3.3 km	MPC · JPL
462453	2008 US_{124}	—	October 22, 2008	Kitt Peak	Spacewatch	·	3.3 km	MPC · JPL
462454	2008 UX_{128}	—	September 24, 2008	Kitt Peak	Spacewatch	·	1.6 km	MPC · JPL
462455	2008 UP_{129}	—	October 23, 2008	Kitt Peak	Spacewatch	·	2.5 km	MPC · JPL
462456	2008 UF_{132}	—	September 28, 2008	Mount Lemmon	Mount Lemmon Survey	EOS	2.3 km	MPC · JPL
462457	2008 UQ_{133}	—	October 23, 2008	Kitt Peak	Spacewatch	ELF	3.6 km	MPC · JPL
462458	2008 UH_{135}	—	October 23, 2008	Kitt Peak	Spacewatch	·	3.1 km	MPC · JPL
462459	2008 UJ_{142}	—	October 23, 2008	Kitt Peak	Spacewatch	·	3.1 km	MPC · JPL
462460	2008 UV_{146}	—	October 3, 2008	Mount Lemmon	Mount Lemmon Survey	·	2.7 km	MPC · JPL
462461	2008 UA_{155}	—	September 25, 2008	Kitt Peak	Spacewatch	·	560 m	MPC · JPL
462462	2008 UX_{168}	—	October 24, 2008	Kitt Peak	Spacewatch	·	4.5 km	MPC · JPL
462463	2008 UW_{173}	—	September 23, 2008	Kitt Peak	Spacewatch	·	2.7 km	MPC · JPL
462464	2008 UU_{175}	—	September 7, 2008	Mount Lemmon	Mount Lemmon Survey	·	2.4 km	MPC · JPL
462465	2008 UC_{176}	—	October 10, 2008	Mount Lemmon	Mount Lemmon Survey	·	450 m	MPC · JPL
462466	2008 UK_{178}	—	October 24, 2008	Mount Lemmon	Mount Lemmon Survey	EOS	1.9 km	MPC · JPL
462467	2008 UW_{181}	—	September 29, 2008	Kitt Peak	Spacewatch	·	2.5 km	MPC · JPL
462468	2008 UH_{182}	—	September 23, 2008	Kitt Peak	Spacewatch	THM	2.0 km	MPC · JPL
462469	2008 UB_{184}	—	September 23, 2008	Kitt Peak	Spacewatch	·	2.7 km	MPC · JPL
462470	2008 UW_{186}	—	October 24, 2008	Kitt Peak	Spacewatch	HYG	3.3 km	MPC · JPL
462471	2008 UU_{188}	—	September 25, 2008	Kitt Peak	Spacewatch	·	2.2 km	MPC · JPL
462472	2008 UG_{211}	—	October 23, 2008	Kitt Peak	Spacewatch	·	2.4 km	MPC · JPL
462473	2008 UJ_{221}	—	October 25, 2008	Kitt Peak	Spacewatch	EOS	1.8 km	MPC · JPL
462474	2008 UR_{223}	—	October 1, 2008	Kitt Peak	Spacewatch	·	3.2 km	MPC · JPL
462475	2008 UN_{254}	—	October 27, 2008	Kitt Peak	Spacewatch	THM	2.0 km	MPC · JPL
462476	2008 UT_{265}	—	October 2, 2008	Kitt Peak	Spacewatch	·	2.9 km	MPC · JPL
462477	2008 UW_{278}	—	September 25, 2008	Kitt Peak	Spacewatch	·	1.8 km	MPC · JPL
462478	2008 UO_{281}	—	October 28, 2008	Kitt Peak	Spacewatch	·	3.6 km	MPC · JPL
462479	2008 UA_{285}	—	September 29, 2008	Kitt Peak	Spacewatch	THM	2.6 km	MPC · JPL
462480	2008 UO_{291}	—	October 29, 2008	Kitt Peak	Spacewatch	·	610 m	MPC · JPL
462481	2008 UB_{295}	—	September 28, 2008	Mount Lemmon	Mount Lemmon Survey	·	3.3 km	MPC · JPL
462482	2008 UC_{298}	—	October 29, 2008	Kitt Peak	Spacewatch	EOS	1.9 km	MPC · JPL
462483	2008 UY_{298}	—	October 29, 2008	Kitt Peak	Spacewatch	·	2.8 km	MPC · JPL
462484	2008 UX_{313}	—	September 22, 2008	Kitt Peak	Spacewatch	·	3.3 km	MPC · JPL
462485	2008 UP_{338}	—	October 21, 2008	Mount Lemmon	Mount Lemmon Survey	·	3.6 km	MPC · JPL
462486	2008 UQ_{353}	—	October 25, 2008	Kitt Peak	Spacewatch	·	2.6 km	MPC · JPL
462487	2008 UF_{354}	—	October 23, 2008	Mount Lemmon	Mount Lemmon Survey	·	2.5 km	MPC · JPL
462488	2008 UF_{360}	—	October 29, 2008	Kitt Peak	Spacewatch	·	3.3 km	MPC · JPL
462489	2008 UY_{362}	—	October 25, 2008	Catalina	CSS	·	4.9 km	MPC · JPL
462490	2008 VU_{12}	—	October 22, 2008	Kitt Peak	Spacewatch	·	590 m	MPC · JPL
462491	2008 VX_{22}	—	November 1, 2008	Catalina	CSS	·	3.4 km	MPC · JPL
462492	2008 VB_{47}	—	October 28, 2008	Kitt Peak	Spacewatch	·	2.8 km	MPC · JPL
462493	2008 VH_{48}	—	November 3, 2008	Kitt Peak	Spacewatch	·	2.5 km	MPC · JPL
462494	2008 VW_{50}	—	November 4, 2008	Kitt Peak	Spacewatch	·	2.8 km	MPC · JPL
462495	2008 VB_{58}	—	November 6, 2008	Catalina	CSS	·	4.7 km	MPC · JPL
462496	2008 VD_{69}	—	October 2, 2008	Mount Lemmon	Mount Lemmon Survey	·	3.5 km	MPC · JPL
462497	2008 VE_{70}	—	November 6, 2008	Kitt Peak	Spacewatch	·	2.3 km	MPC · JPL
462498	2008 VE_{74}	—	November 7, 2008	Mount Lemmon	Mount Lemmon Survey	VER	3.1 km	MPC · JPL
462499	2008 VK_{76}	—	November 1, 2008	Mount Lemmon	Mount Lemmon Survey	·	700 m	MPC · JPL
462500	2008 VV_{77}	—	November 6, 2008	Mount Lemmon	Mount Lemmon Survey	EOS	1.9 km	MPC · JPL

== 462501–462600 ==
back to top

Designation			Discovery			Properties		Ref
Permanent	Provisional	Named after	Date	Site	Discoverer(s)	Category	Diam.	Ref
462501	2008 WM_{3}	—	September 6, 2008	Mount Lemmon	Mount Lemmon Survey	·	2.2 km	MPC · JPL
462502	2008 WG_{8}	—	April 20, 2006	Kitt Peak	Spacewatch	EOS	1.7 km	MPC · JPL
462503	2008 WJ_{25}	—	November 2, 2008	Mount Lemmon	Mount Lemmon Survey	·	4.0 km	MPC · JPL
462504	2008 WU_{32}	—	September 27, 2008	Mount Lemmon	Mount Lemmon Survey	·	2.2 km	MPC · JPL
462505	2008 WW_{36}	—	November 17, 2008	Kitt Peak	Spacewatch	·	3.3 km	MPC · JPL
462506	2008 WF_{46}	—	October 31, 2008	Kitt Peak	Spacewatch	VER	2.9 km	MPC · JPL
462507	2008 WR_{75}	—	November 20, 2008	Kitt Peak	Spacewatch	·	680 m	MPC · JPL
462508	2008 WV_{76}	—	November 20, 2008	Kitt Peak	Spacewatch	·	2.8 km	MPC · JPL
462509	2008 WD_{84}	—	November 20, 2008	Kitt Peak	Spacewatch	·	570 m	MPC · JPL
462510	2008 WH_{85}	—	November 20, 2008	Kitt Peak	Spacewatch	·	2.9 km	MPC · JPL
462511	2008 WK_{92}	—	November 24, 2008	Dauban	Kugel, F.	URS	4.3 km	MPC · JPL
462512	2008 WT_{97}	—	November 3, 2008	Catalina	CSS	·	3.6 km	MPC · JPL
462513	2008 WL_{99}	—	October 23, 2008	Mount Lemmon	Mount Lemmon Survey	URS	3.5 km	MPC · JPL
462514	2008 WA_{106}	—	November 30, 2008	Kitt Peak	Spacewatch	·	3.6 km	MPC · JPL
462515	2008 WP_{108}	—	October 25, 2008	Kitt Peak	Spacewatch	·	3.5 km	MPC · JPL
462516	2008 WZ_{121}	—	September 24, 2008	Mount Lemmon	Mount Lemmon Survey	VER	2.6 km	MPC · JPL
462517	2008 XK_{8}	—	October 28, 2008	Catalina	CSS	·	3.4 km	MPC · JPL
462518	2008 XN_{14}	—	September 24, 2008	Mount Lemmon	Mount Lemmon Survey	·	3.0 km	MPC · JPL
462519	2008 XZ_{26}	—	October 31, 2008	Kitt Peak	Spacewatch	·	3.0 km	MPC · JPL
462520	2008 XO_{32}	—	October 27, 2008	Kitt Peak	Spacewatch	·	3.5 km	MPC · JPL
462521	2008 XL_{38}	—	December 2, 2008	Kitt Peak	Spacewatch	·	3.0 km	MPC · JPL
462522	2008 XX_{45}	—	December 4, 2008	Mount Lemmon	Mount Lemmon Survey	·	3.0 km	MPC · JPL
462523	2008 YE_{66}	—	December 29, 2008	Mount Lemmon	Mount Lemmon Survey	·	3.1 km	MPC · JPL
462524	2008 YC_{95}	—	March 4, 2006	Catalina	CSS	·	920 m	MPC · JPL
462525	2008 YZ_{95}	—	December 29, 2008	Kitt Peak	Spacewatch	·	610 m	MPC · JPL
462526	2008 YG_{104}	—	December 22, 2008	Kitt Peak	Spacewatch	·	510 m	MPC · JPL
462527	2008 YR_{116}	—	July 29, 2000	Cerro Tololo	Deep Ecliptic Survey	·	650 m	MPC · JPL
462528	2008 YV_{142}	—	December 30, 2008	Kitt Peak	Spacewatch	·	650 m	MPC · JPL
462529	2008 YL_{156}	—	December 29, 2008	Mount Lemmon	Mount Lemmon Survey	V	510 m	MPC · JPL
462530	2008 YF_{160}	—	December 30, 2008	Mount Lemmon	Mount Lemmon Survey	·	730 m	MPC · JPL
462531	2008 YE_{171}	—	December 22, 2008	Kitt Peak	Spacewatch	(2076)	670 m	MPC · JPL
462532	2009 AT_{39}	—	December 22, 2008	Mount Lemmon	Mount Lemmon Survey	·	540 m	MPC · JPL
462533	2009 AK_{40}	—	December 22, 2008	Mount Lemmon	Mount Lemmon Survey	SYL · CYB	3.5 km	MPC · JPL
462534	2009 BA_{20}	—	December 29, 2008	Kitt Peak	Spacewatch	·	2.8 km	MPC · JPL
462535	2009 BD_{48}	—	January 2, 2009	Kitt Peak	Spacewatch	·	520 m	MPC · JPL
462536	2009 BO_{49}	—	January 16, 2009	Mount Lemmon	Mount Lemmon Survey	·	750 m	MPC · JPL
462537	2009 BL_{88}	—	January 25, 2009	Kitt Peak	Spacewatch	·	730 m	MPC · JPL
462538	2009 BP_{89}	—	January 25, 2009	Kitt Peak	Spacewatch	·	550 m	MPC · JPL
462539	2009 BC_{91}	—	December 30, 2008	Mount Lemmon	Mount Lemmon Survey	·	810 m	MPC · JPL
462540	2009 BD_{93}	—	January 25, 2009	Kitt Peak	Spacewatch	·	740 m	MPC · JPL
462541	2009 BT_{105}	—	January 25, 2009	Kitt Peak	Spacewatch	·	540 m	MPC · JPL
462542	2009 BW_{114}	—	January 15, 2009	Kitt Peak	Spacewatch	·	730 m	MPC · JPL
462543	2009 BD_{117}	—	January 29, 2009	Mount Lemmon	Mount Lemmon Survey	·	530 m	MPC · JPL
462544	2009 BP_{142}	—	January 30, 2009	Kitt Peak	Spacewatch	·	630 m	MPC · JPL
462545	2009 BH_{155}	—	January 1, 2009	Mount Lemmon	Mount Lemmon Survey	CYB	3.2 km	MPC · JPL
462546	2009 BV_{165}	—	January 31, 2009	Kitt Peak	Spacewatch	·	440 m	MPC · JPL
462547	2009 BR_{171}	—	January 17, 2009	Kitt Peak	Spacewatch	·	770 m	MPC · JPL
462548	2009 BB_{183}	—	January 25, 2009	Kitt Peak	Spacewatch	·	590 m	MPC · JPL
462549	2009 BS_{184}	—	November 24, 2008	Mount Lemmon	Mount Lemmon Survey	·	590 m	MPC · JPL
462550	2009 CB_{3}	—	February 4, 2009	Mount Lemmon	Mount Lemmon Survey	APO · PHA	420 m	MPC · JPL
462551	2009 CP_{14}	—	January 3, 2009	Mount Lemmon	Mount Lemmon Survey	·	590 m	MPC · JPL
462552	2009 CK_{18}	—	February 3, 2009	Mount Lemmon	Mount Lemmon Survey	V	650 m	MPC · JPL
462553	2009 CE_{19}	—	January 17, 2009	Mount Lemmon	Mount Lemmon Survey	·	790 m	MPC · JPL
462554	2009 CL_{27}	—	February 1, 2009	Kitt Peak	Spacewatch	NYS	850 m	MPC · JPL
462555	2009 CD_{42}	—	January 15, 2009	Kitt Peak	Spacewatch	·	500 m	MPC · JPL
462556	2009 CJ_{60}	—	November 23, 2008	Mount Lemmon	Mount Lemmon Survey	·	570 m	MPC · JPL
462557	2009 CS_{62}	—	February 14, 2009	Kitt Peak	Spacewatch	·	1.3 km	MPC · JPL
462558	2009 CO_{65}	—	February 3, 2009	Mount Lemmon	Mount Lemmon Survey	·	980 m	MPC · JPL
462559	2009 DD_{1}	—	February 19, 2009	Catalina	CSS	AMO	270 m	MPC · JPL
462560	2009 DM_{12}	—	February 16, 2009	Kitt Peak	Spacewatch	·	670 m	MPC · JPL
462561	2009 DS_{24}	—	February 21, 2009	Kitt Peak	Spacewatch	(883)	710 m	MPC · JPL
462562	2009 DH_{28}	—	February 22, 2009	Calar Alto	F. Hormuth	·	660 m	MPC · JPL
462563	2009 DK_{49}	—	February 19, 2009	Kitt Peak	Spacewatch	·	760 m	MPC · JPL
462564	2009 DP_{52}	—	February 22, 2009	Kitt Peak	Spacewatch	·	730 m	MPC · JPL
462565	2009 DC_{56}	—	February 4, 2009	Mount Lemmon	Mount Lemmon Survey	·	700 m	MPC · JPL
462566	2009 DC_{59}	—	February 22, 2009	Kitt Peak	Spacewatch	·	1.1 km	MPC · JPL
462567	2009 DW_{69}	—	February 3, 2009	Kitt Peak	Spacewatch	(2076)	720 m	MPC · JPL
462568	2009 DT_{89}	—	January 1, 2009	Kitt Peak	Spacewatch	·	540 m	MPC · JPL
462569	2009 DU_{92}	—	February 28, 2009	Mount Lemmon	Mount Lemmon Survey	·	690 m	MPC · JPL
462570	2009 DU_{101}	—	February 26, 2009	Kitt Peak	Spacewatch	·	820 m	MPC · JPL
462571	2009 DA_{123}	—	February 19, 2009	Kitt Peak	Spacewatch	·	620 m	MPC · JPL
462572	2009 DT_{126}	—	February 20, 2009	Kitt Peak	Spacewatch	·	630 m	MPC · JPL
462573	2009 DW_{127}	—	February 20, 2009	Kitt Peak	Spacewatch	·	1.7 km	MPC · JPL
462574	2009 DB_{129}	—	February 24, 2009	Mount Lemmon	Mount Lemmon Survey	·	1.1 km	MPC · JPL
462575	2009 DV_{131}	—	February 20, 2009	Kitt Peak	Spacewatch	·	750 m	MPC · JPL
462576	2009 DM_{139}	—	February 28, 2009	Kitt Peak	Spacewatch	·	940 m	MPC · JPL
462577	2009 EZ_{2}	—	March 5, 2009	Cerro Burek	Burek, Cerro	PHO	870 m	MPC · JPL
462578	2009 EX_{3}	—	March 15, 2009	La Sagra	OAM	·	850 m	MPC · JPL
462579	2009 EQ_{25}	—	March 7, 2009	Mount Lemmon	Mount Lemmon Survey	·	690 m	MPC · JPL
462580	2009 FR_{3}	—	March 3, 2009	Mount Lemmon	Mount Lemmon Survey	MAS	690 m	MPC · JPL
462581	2009 FE_{8}	—	March 1, 2009	Kitt Peak	Spacewatch	·	960 m	MPC · JPL
462582	2009 FX_{15}	—	March 1, 2009	Kitt Peak	Spacewatch	·	860 m	MPC · JPL
462583	2009 FO_{17}	—	March 3, 2009	Kitt Peak	Spacewatch	·	670 m	MPC · JPL
462584	2009 FR_{20}	—	February 28, 2009	Mount Lemmon	Mount Lemmon Survey	·	760 m	MPC · JPL
462585	2009 FP_{55}	—	March 24, 2009	Mount Lemmon	Mount Lemmon Survey	·	780 m	MPC · JPL
462586	2009 FN_{61}	—	March 26, 2009	Kitt Peak	Spacewatch	MAS	630 m	MPC · JPL
462587	2009 FB_{66}	—	March 19, 2009	Mount Lemmon	Mount Lemmon Survey	·	700 m	MPC · JPL
462588	2009 FX_{69}	—	March 18, 2009	Kitt Peak	Spacewatch	CLA	1.5 km	MPC · JPL
462589	2009 FE_{72}	—	March 17, 2009	La Sagra	OAM	PHO	730 m	MPC · JPL
462590	2009 FD_{77}	—	March 19, 2009	Mount Lemmon	Mount Lemmon Survey	·	960 m	MPC · JPL
462591	2009 GZ_{4}	—	April 5, 2009	Kitt Peak	Spacewatch	·	1.0 km	MPC · JPL
462592	2009 HC_{3}	—	April 16, 2009	Catalina	CSS	·	1.3 km	MPC · JPL
462593	2009 HV_{3}	—	October 20, 2007	Mount Lemmon	Mount Lemmon Survey	V	750 m	MPC · JPL
462594	2009 HH_{7}	—	April 17, 2009	Kitt Peak	Spacewatch	·	1.2 km	MPC · JPL
462595	2009 HN_{8}	—	April 17, 2009	Kitt Peak	Spacewatch	·	1.1 km	MPC · JPL
462596	2009 HN_{16}	—	April 18, 2009	Kitt Peak	Spacewatch	V	590 m	MPC · JPL
462597	2009 HL_{17}	—	April 18, 2009	Kitt Peak	Spacewatch	MAS	520 m	MPC · JPL
462598	2009 HA_{33}	—	April 19, 2009	Kitt Peak	Spacewatch	·	940 m	MPC · JPL
462599	2009 HB_{38}	—	April 18, 2009	Kitt Peak	Spacewatch	·	810 m	MPC · JPL
462600	2009 HJ_{41}	—	March 18, 2009	Kitt Peak	Spacewatch	·	870 m	MPC · JPL

== 462601–462700 ==
back to top

Designation			Discovery			Properties		Ref
Permanent	Provisional	Named after	Date	Site	Discoverer(s)	Category	Diam.	Ref
462601	2009 HF_{43}	—	July 25, 2006	Mount Lemmon	Mount Lemmon Survey	·	660 m	MPC · JPL
462602	2009 HW_{47}	—	March 28, 2009	Mount Lemmon	Mount Lemmon Survey	·	1.3 km	MPC · JPL
462603	2009 HE_{52}	—	March 29, 2009	Kitt Peak	Spacewatch	·	1.0 km	MPC · JPL
462604	2009 HA_{60}	—	April 22, 2009	Mount Lemmon	Mount Lemmon Survey	·	570 m	MPC · JPL
462605	2009 HM_{61}	—	March 17, 2009	Kitt Peak	Spacewatch	·	940 m	MPC · JPL
462606	2009 HG_{73}	—	April 17, 2009	Catalina	CSS	·	1.3 km	MPC · JPL
462607	2009 HK_{79}	—	April 26, 2009	Kitt Peak	Spacewatch	·	880 m	MPC · JPL
462608	2009 HM_{90}	—	April 8, 2002	Kitt Peak	Spacewatch	·	690 m	MPC · JPL
462609	2009 HY_{94}	—	April 29, 2009	Cerro Burek	Burek, Cerro	MAS	630 m	MPC · JPL
462610	2009 KC_{9}	—	March 3, 2005	Catalina	CSS	ERI	1.8 km	MPC · JPL
462611	2009 KP_{11}	—	March 1, 2009	Mount Lemmon	Mount Lemmon Survey	V	640 m	MPC · JPL
462612	2009 LM	—	June 1, 2009	Cerro Burek	Burek, Cerro	·	1.1 km	MPC · JPL
462613	2009 MZ_{7}	—	June 26, 2009	La Sagra	OAM	PHO	1.5 km	MPC · JPL
462614	2009 OX_{7}	—	July 27, 2009	Kitt Peak	Spacewatch	(194)	2.3 km	MPC · JPL
462615	2009 OA_{12}	—	July 27, 2009	Kitt Peak	Spacewatch	·	1.3 km	MPC · JPL
462616	2009 OB_{25}	—	July 28, 2009	Catalina	CSS	·	2.0 km	MPC · JPL
462617	2009 PK_{2}	—	August 12, 2009	La Sagra	OAM	ADE	2.2 km	MPC · JPL
462618	2009 PT_{7}	—	August 15, 2009	Kitt Peak	Spacewatch	H	490 m	MPC · JPL
462619	2009 PV_{8}	—	August 15, 2009	Catalina	CSS	·	2.1 km	MPC · JPL
462620	2009 PJ_{17}	—	August 15, 2009	Kitt Peak	Spacewatch	·	1.2 km	MPC · JPL
462621	2009 PF_{18}	—	August 15, 2009	Kitt Peak	Spacewatch	·	1.4 km	MPC · JPL
462622	2009 QM_{16}	—	August 16, 2009	Kitt Peak	Spacewatch	·	1.4 km	MPC · JPL
462623	2009 QS_{16}	—	July 31, 2009	Catalina	CSS	·	1.8 km	MPC · JPL
462624	2009 QS_{17}	—	August 17, 2009	Kitt Peak	Spacewatch	·	1.9 km	MPC · JPL
462625	2009 QZ_{19}	—	August 19, 2009	La Sagra	OAM	NYS	1.2 km	MPC · JPL
462626	2009 QY_{31}	—	August 15, 2009	Kitt Peak	Spacewatch	·	1.7 km	MPC · JPL
462627	2009 QE_{33}	—	August 21, 2009	Needville	J. Dellinger, Sexton, C.	·	1.8 km	MPC · JPL
462628	2009 QK_{52}	—	August 16, 2009	Kitt Peak	Spacewatch	·	1.7 km	MPC · JPL
462629	2009 QX_{53}	—	August 18, 2009	Kitt Peak	Spacewatch	·	1.6 km	MPC · JPL
462630	2009 QL_{58}	—	August 16, 2009	Kitt Peak	Spacewatch	·	1.4 km	MPC · JPL
462631	2009 RR_{3}	—	September 13, 2009	Socorro	LINEAR	H	580 m	MPC · JPL
462632	2009 RK_{10}	—	November 4, 2005	Mount Lemmon	Mount Lemmon Survey	·	1.4 km	MPC · JPL
462633	2009 RV_{43}	—	August 18, 2009	Kitt Peak	Spacewatch	·	1.1 km	MPC · JPL
462634	2009 RA_{48}	—	September 15, 2009	Kitt Peak	Spacewatch	·	2.7 km	MPC · JPL
462635	2009 RR_{66}	—	August 29, 2009	Kitt Peak	Spacewatch	PAD	1.5 km	MPC · JPL
462636	2009 RQ_{74}	—	September 14, 2009	Socorro	LINEAR	MRX	1.0 km	MPC · JPL
462637	2009 SL_{27}	—	September 16, 2009	Kitt Peak	Spacewatch	MRX	1.0 km	MPC · JPL
462638	2009 SU_{38}	—	September 16, 2009	Kitt Peak	Spacewatch	·	1.5 km	MPC · JPL
462639	2009 SS_{47}	—	September 16, 2009	Kitt Peak	Spacewatch	(194)	1.5 km	MPC · JPL
462640	2009 SQ_{57}	—	September 17, 2009	Kitt Peak	Spacewatch	·	2.9 km	MPC · JPL
462641	2009 SG_{62}	—	March 20, 2007	Mount Lemmon	Mount Lemmon Survey	AGN	980 m	MPC · JPL
462642	2009 SC_{112}	—	September 18, 2009	Kitt Peak	Spacewatch	·	1.9 km	MPC · JPL
462643	2009 SX_{127}	—	September 18, 2009	Kitt Peak	Spacewatch	·	2.0 km	MPC · JPL
462644	2009 SH_{134}	—	September 18, 2009	Kitt Peak	Spacewatch	·	1.7 km	MPC · JPL
462645	2009 ST_{134}	—	September 18, 2009	Kitt Peak	Spacewatch	·	1.5 km	MPC · JPL
462646	2009 SJ_{136}	—	September 18, 2009	Kitt Peak	Spacewatch	AGN	1.0 km	MPC · JPL
462647	2009 SD_{142}	—	April 3, 2003	Anderson Mesa	LONEOS	·	1.8 km	MPC · JPL
462648	2009 SP_{164}	—	September 21, 2009	Kitt Peak	Spacewatch	·	1.8 km	MPC · JPL
462649	2009 SJ_{177}	—	March 12, 2007	Kitt Peak	Spacewatch	HOF	2.4 km	MPC · JPL
462650	2009 SQ_{184}	—	September 21, 2009	Kitt Peak	Spacewatch	·	1.4 km	MPC · JPL
462651	2009 SA_{217}	—	September 24, 2009	Kitt Peak	Spacewatch	·	1.7 km	MPC · JPL
462652	2009 SE_{238}	—	October 27, 2005	Anderson Mesa	LONEOS	·	1.5 km	MPC · JPL
462653	2009 SW_{240}	—	September 18, 2009	Catalina	CSS	·	2.0 km	MPC · JPL
462654	2009 SK_{261}	—	September 22, 2009	Kitt Peak	Spacewatch	BRA	1.1 km	MPC · JPL
462655	2009 SC_{274}	—	September 17, 2009	Kitt Peak	Spacewatch	·	1.7 km	MPC · JPL
462656	2009 SZ_{276}	—	September 17, 2009	Kitt Peak	Spacewatch	EUN	980 m	MPC · JPL
462657	2009 SM_{295}	—	October 1, 2005	Mount Lemmon	Mount Lemmon Survey	·	1.5 km	MPC · JPL
462658	2009 SL_{313}	—	October 30, 2005	Kitt Peak	Spacewatch	·	1.7 km	MPC · JPL
462659	2009 SF_{332}	—	October 24, 2005	Kitt Peak	Spacewatch	·	2.2 km	MPC · JPL
462660	2009 SV_{332}	—	July 30, 2009	Catalina	CSS	·	4.2 km	MPC · JPL
462661	2009 SV_{334}	—	September 18, 2009	Kitt Peak	Spacewatch	·	1.9 km	MPC · JPL
462662	2009 SM_{341}	—	September 25, 2009	Kitt Peak	Spacewatch	·	1.4 km	MPC · JPL
462663	2009 SF_{343}	—	September 17, 2009	Kitt Peak	Spacewatch	·	1.6 km	MPC · JPL
462664	2009 SA_{350}	—	September 20, 2009	Kitt Peak	Spacewatch	GEF	1.1 km	MPC · JPL
462665	2009 SD_{351}	—	September 28, 2009	Mount Lemmon	Mount Lemmon Survey	·	1.9 km	MPC · JPL
462666	2009 SF_{353}	—	September 19, 2009	Kitt Peak	Spacewatch	AGN	920 m	MPC · JPL
462667	2009 TJ_{6}	—	October 12, 2009	Mount Lemmon	Mount Lemmon Survey	·	1.8 km	MPC · JPL
462668	2009 TP_{6}	—	September 18, 2009	Catalina	CSS	H	520 m	MPC · JPL
462669	2009 TV_{20}	—	September 22, 2009	Kitt Peak	Spacewatch	·	1.8 km	MPC · JPL
462670	2009 TO_{31}	—	September 30, 2009	Mount Lemmon	Mount Lemmon Survey	·	1.6 km	MPC · JPL
462671	2009 TK_{38}	—	September 22, 2009	Catalina	CSS	·	1.8 km	MPC · JPL
462672	2009 TP_{41}	—	October 12, 2009	Mount Lemmon	Mount Lemmon Survey	·	2.2 km	MPC · JPL
462673	2009 TS_{46}	—	March 15, 2005	Catalina	CSS	H	500 m	MPC · JPL
462674	2009 UG_{23}	—	October 17, 2009	La Sagra	OAM	GEF	1.5 km	MPC · JPL
462675	2009 UA_{31}	—	September 12, 2004	Kitt Peak	Spacewatch	·	1.6 km	MPC · JPL
462676	2009 UO_{51}	—	October 22, 2009	Mount Lemmon	Mount Lemmon Survey	·	1.8 km	MPC · JPL
462677	2009 UL_{56}	—	February 2, 2006	Kitt Peak	Spacewatch	KOR	1.1 km	MPC · JPL
462678	2009 UN_{57}	—	September 18, 1995	Kitt Peak	Spacewatch	(12739)	1.2 km	MPC · JPL
462679	2009 UO_{58}	—	October 23, 2009	Mount Lemmon	Mount Lemmon Survey	·	2.0 km	MPC · JPL
462680	2009 UT_{85}	—	October 23, 2009	Mount Lemmon	Mount Lemmon Survey	·	1.6 km	MPC · JPL
462681	2009 UX_{86}	—	October 11, 2009	Mount Lemmon	Mount Lemmon Survey	·	1.5 km	MPC · JPL
462682	2009 UD_{93}	—	October 26, 2009	Bisei SG Center	BATTeRS	·	2.0 km	MPC · JPL
462683	2009 UA_{97}	—	October 22, 2009	Mount Lemmon	Mount Lemmon Survey	AGN	1.1 km	MPC · JPL
462684	2009 UT_{108}	—	October 23, 2009	Kitt Peak	Spacewatch	·	1.5 km	MPC · JPL
462685	2009 UN_{143}	—	October 18, 2009	Mount Lemmon	Mount Lemmon Survey	·	1.4 km	MPC · JPL
462686	2009 UR_{146}	—	October 27, 2009	Kitt Peak	Spacewatch	KOR	1.1 km	MPC · JPL
462687	2009 UC_{148}	—	October 18, 2009	Mount Lemmon	Mount Lemmon Survey	·	2.1 km	MPC · JPL
462688	2009 UH_{148}	—	October 22, 2009	Mount Lemmon	Mount Lemmon Survey	·	3.1 km	MPC · JPL
462689	2009 UM_{149}	—	October 26, 2009	Kitt Peak	Spacewatch	·	1.6 km	MPC · JPL
462690	2009 VW_{16}	—	November 8, 2009	Mount Lemmon	Mount Lemmon Survey	·	2.4 km	MPC · JPL
462691	2009 VE_{26}	—	September 15, 2009	Kitt Peak	Spacewatch	·	1.5 km	MPC · JPL
462692	2009 VG_{31}	—	March 9, 2005	Catalina	CSS	H	500 m	MPC · JPL
462693	2009 VC_{36}	—	November 23, 1995	Kitt Peak	Spacewatch	HOF	2.5 km	MPC · JPL
462694	2009 VZ_{42}	—	October 21, 2009	Mount Lemmon	Mount Lemmon Survey	·	2.2 km	MPC · JPL
462695	2009 VA_{63}	—	November 14, 1998	Kitt Peak	Spacewatch	·	2.2 km	MPC · JPL
462696	2009 VF_{69}	—	September 20, 2009	Kitt Peak	Spacewatch	·	3.1 km	MPC · JPL
462697	2009 VU_{71}	—	November 11, 2009	Kitt Peak	Spacewatch	GEF	1.6 km	MPC · JPL
462698	2009 VA_{73}	—	September 17, 2009	Catalina	CSS	T_{j} (2.99)	5.2 km	MPC · JPL
462699	2009 VA_{76}	—	November 12, 2009	Modra	Gajdoš, Š.	·	2.4 km	MPC · JPL
462700	2009 VV_{87}	—	November 10, 2009	Kitt Peak	Spacewatch	EOS	1.4 km	MPC · JPL

== 462701–462800 ==
back to top

Designation			Discovery			Properties		Ref
Permanent	Provisional	Named after	Date	Site	Discoverer(s)	Category	Diam.	Ref
462701	2009 VY_{88}	—	October 26, 2009	Kitt Peak	Spacewatch	·	2.2 km	MPC · JPL
462702	2009 VZ_{88}	—	November 11, 2009	Kitt Peak	Spacewatch	AGN	940 m	MPC · JPL
462703	2009 VB_{103}	—	October 23, 2009	Kitt Peak	Spacewatch	·	1.7 km	MPC · JPL
462704	2009 WM_{12}	—	November 16, 2009	Mount Lemmon	Mount Lemmon Survey	·	1.5 km	MPC · JPL
462705	2009 WX_{18}	—	November 17, 2009	Mount Lemmon	Mount Lemmon Survey	·	1.5 km	MPC · JPL
462706	2009 WZ_{31}	—	November 16, 2009	Kitt Peak	Spacewatch	HOF	3.0 km	MPC · JPL
462707	2009 WF_{36}	—	September 21, 2009	Mount Lemmon	Mount Lemmon Survey	EOS	1.5 km	MPC · JPL
462708	2009 WZ_{37}	—	October 26, 2009	Mount Lemmon	Mount Lemmon Survey	·	2.6 km	MPC · JPL
462709	2009 WT_{52}	—	November 17, 2009	Needville	Sexton, C., J. Dellinger	·	2.9 km	MPC · JPL
462710	2009 WQ_{65}	—	November 17, 2009	Mount Lemmon	Mount Lemmon Survey	·	2.7 km	MPC · JPL
462711	2009 WZ_{116}	—	October 27, 2009	Kitt Peak	Spacewatch	·	1.4 km	MPC · JPL
462712	2009 WU_{118}	—	November 20, 2009	Kitt Peak	Spacewatch	·	1.5 km	MPC · JPL
462713	2009 WE_{121}	—	September 29, 2003	Kitt Peak	Spacewatch	THM	1.7 km	MPC · JPL
462714	2009 WQ_{127}	—	February 1, 2006	Kitt Peak	Spacewatch	·	2.0 km	MPC · JPL
462715	2009 WG_{139}	—	November 26, 2009	Mount Lemmon	Mount Lemmon Survey	·	2.2 km	MPC · JPL
462716	2009 WG_{174}	—	November 10, 2009	Kitt Peak	Spacewatch	·	1.5 km	MPC · JPL
462717	2009 WR_{215}	—	September 25, 2009	Catalina	CSS	H	670 m	MPC · JPL
462718	2009 WO_{239}	—	November 17, 2009	Kitt Peak	Spacewatch	·	2.5 km	MPC · JPL
462719	2009 WK_{261}	—	November 16, 2009	Socorro	LINEAR	·	2.0 km	MPC · JPL
462720	2009 XZ_{17}	—	November 16, 2009	Mount Lemmon	Mount Lemmon Survey	·	3.7 km	MPC · JPL
462721	2009 XQ_{18}	—	December 15, 2009	Mount Lemmon	Mount Lemmon Survey	·	3.7 km	MPC · JPL
462722	2009 YF_{19}	—	December 26, 2009	Kitt Peak	Spacewatch	·	2.3 km	MPC · JPL
462723	2009 YK_{20}	—	December 18, 2009	Kitt Peak	Spacewatch	·	2.7 km	MPC · JPL
462724	2009 YO_{22}	—	December 18, 2009	Kitt Peak	Spacewatch	·	2.7 km	MPC · JPL
462725	2010 AP_{2}	—	March 10, 2005	Mount Lemmon	Mount Lemmon Survey	·	1.7 km	MPC · JPL
462726	2010 AK_{11}	—	January 6, 2010	Mount Lemmon	Mount Lemmon Survey	·	4.4 km	MPC · JPL
462727	2010 AB_{27}	—	January 6, 2010	Kitt Peak	Spacewatch	·	2.4 km	MPC · JPL
462728	2010 AM_{33}	—	December 20, 2009	Mount Lemmon	Mount Lemmon Survey	·	3.4 km	MPC · JPL
462729	2010 AZ_{36}	—	January 7, 2010	Kitt Peak	Spacewatch	·	2.8 km	MPC · JPL
462730	2010 AM_{48}	—	January 8, 2010	Kitt Peak	Spacewatch	·	3.0 km	MPC · JPL
462731	2010 AO_{52}	—	January 8, 2010	Mount Lemmon	Mount Lemmon Survey	·	2.6 km	MPC · JPL
462732	2010 AL_{58}	—	January 11, 2010	Kitt Peak	Spacewatch	·	2.5 km	MPC · JPL
462733	2010 AQ_{60}	—	November 23, 2009	Mount Lemmon	Mount Lemmon Survey	·	2.6 km	MPC · JPL
462734	2010 AZ_{61}	—	January 7, 2010	Catalina	CSS	·	5.7 km	MPC · JPL
462735	2010 AD_{63}	—	January 8, 2010	Kitt Peak	Spacewatch	·	3.5 km	MPC · JPL
462736	2010 BL_{2}	—	January 19, 2010	Siding Spring	SSS	T_{j} (2.75) · APO +1km	1.8 km	MPC · JPL
462737	2010 BF_{49}	—	April 12, 2010	Mount Lemmon	Mount Lemmon Survey	T_{j} (2.97)	3.5 km	MPC · JPL
462738	2010 BV_{98}	—	January 27, 2010	WISE	WISE	·	5.3 km	MPC · JPL
462739	2010 CD_{4}	—	February 6, 2010	Mount Lemmon	Mount Lemmon Survey	·	3.7 km	MPC · JPL
462740	2010 CU_{20}	—	February 9, 2010	Kitt Peak	Spacewatch	·	4.7 km	MPC · JPL
462741	2010 CR_{25}	—	February 9, 2010	Mount Lemmon	Mount Lemmon Survey	·	2.2 km	MPC · JPL
462742	2010 CO_{38}	—	February 13, 2010	Catalina	CSS	·	3.3 km	MPC · JPL
462743	2010 CO_{56}	—	February 12, 2010	Socorro	LINEAR	T_{j} (2.93)	3.2 km	MPC · JPL
462744	2010 CH_{68}	—	February 10, 2010	Kitt Peak	Spacewatch	·	2.9 km	MPC · JPL
462745	2010 CL_{80}	—	February 13, 2010	Mount Lemmon	Mount Lemmon Survey	·	3.7 km	MPC · JPL
462746	2010 CM_{80}	—	February 13, 2010	Mount Lemmon	Mount Lemmon Survey	·	3.7 km	MPC · JPL
462747	2010 CQ_{83}	—	February 14, 2010	Mount Lemmon	Mount Lemmon Survey	·	2.8 km	MPC · JPL
462748	2010 CZ_{109}	—	February 14, 2010	Mount Lemmon	Mount Lemmon Survey	·	2.9 km	MPC · JPL
462749	2010 CE_{113}	—	January 8, 1999	Kitt Peak	Spacewatch	·	3.0 km	MPC · JPL
462750	2010 CU_{137}	—	February 9, 2010	Kitt Peak	Spacewatch	·	3.3 km	MPC · JPL
462751	2010 CU_{146}	—	February 13, 2010	Mount Lemmon	Mount Lemmon Survey	·	4.5 km	MPC · JPL
462752	2010 CA_{155}	—	February 15, 2010	Catalina	CSS	·	2.7 km	MPC · JPL
462753	2010 CR_{158}	—	February 15, 2010	Mount Lemmon	Mount Lemmon Survey	LIX	3.8 km	MPC · JPL
462754	2010 CG_{167}	—	January 11, 2010	Kitt Peak	Spacewatch	·	3.8 km	MPC · JPL
462755	2010 CW_{167}	—	February 15, 2010	Catalina	CSS	·	3.8 km	MPC · JPL
462756	2010 DQ_{1}	—	February 17, 2010	Sternwarte Hagen	Klein, M.	·	5.0 km	MPC · JPL
462757	2010 DX_{4}	—	January 10, 2010	Kitt Peak	Spacewatch	·	4.0 km	MPC · JPL
462758	2010 DF_{13}	—	September 30, 2003	Kitt Peak	Spacewatch	·	3.7 km	MPC · JPL
462759	2010 DH_{31}	—	March 5, 2006	Kitt Peak	Spacewatch	EOS	3.0 km	MPC · JPL
462760	2010 DJ_{35}	—	January 17, 2004	Kitt Peak	Spacewatch	VER	3.0 km	MPC · JPL
462761	2010 DK_{36}	—	February 16, 2010	Mount Lemmon	Mount Lemmon Survey	·	4.1 km	MPC · JPL
462762	2010 DA_{44}	—	February 6, 2010	Kitt Peak	Spacewatch	·	3.3 km	MPC · JPL
462763	2010 DG_{44}	—	February 6, 2010	Kitt Peak	Spacewatch	·	3.3 km	MPC · JPL
462764	2010 DP_{76}	—	February 18, 2010	Mount Lemmon	Mount Lemmon Survey	·	4.0 km	MPC · JPL
462765	2010 EN_{12}	—	March 8, 2010	Taunus	Karge, S., E. Schwab	·	3.0 km	MPC · JPL
462766	2010 EP_{36}	—	March 12, 2010	Kitt Peak	Spacewatch	·	4.5 km	MPC · JPL
462767	2010 EW_{43}	—	December 22, 2003	Kitt Peak	Spacewatch	·	2.9 km	MPC · JPL
462768	2010 EB_{81}	—	October 15, 2007	Kitt Peak	Spacewatch	·	2.7 km	MPC · JPL
462769	2010 EC_{94}	—	March 14, 2010	Mount Lemmon	Mount Lemmon Survey	·	4.1 km	MPC · JPL
462770	2010 EP_{127}	—	December 20, 2009	Mount Lemmon	Mount Lemmon Survey	·	3.0 km	MPC · JPL
462771	2010 EC_{128}	—	May 8, 2005	Kitt Peak	Spacewatch	·	2.8 km	MPC · JPL
462772	2010 EU_{130}	—	March 13, 2010	Mount Lemmon	Mount Lemmon Survey	·	3.9 km	MPC · JPL
462773	2010 FU_{48}	—	March 26, 2000	Anderson Mesa	LONEOS	T_{j} (2.92)	3.1 km	MPC · JPL
462774	2010 FG_{90}	—	September 17, 2006	Kitt Peak	Spacewatch	·	2.9 km	MPC · JPL
462775	2010 GY_{6}	—	April 6, 2010	Catalina	CSS	APO	580 m	MPC · JPL
462776	2010 GM_{33}	—	October 27, 1995	Kitt Peak	Spacewatch	·	4.3 km	MPC · JPL
462777	2010 GM_{109}	—	May 13, 2005	Mount Lemmon	Mount Lemmon Survey	THM	2.1 km	MPC · JPL
462778	2010 GJ_{110}	—	February 18, 2010	Mount Lemmon	Mount Lemmon Survey	·	2.6 km	MPC · JPL
462779	2010 GX_{118}	—	April 11, 2010	Kitt Peak	Spacewatch	·	3.2 km	MPC · JPL
462780	2010 GU_{146}	—	April 9, 2010	Catalina	CSS	T_{j} (2.98)	4.7 km	MPC · JPL
462781	2010 GC_{154}	—	January 6, 2010	Kitt Peak	Spacewatch	·	3.3 km	MPC · JPL
462782	2010 GD_{172}	—	April 4, 2010	Palomar	Palomar Transient Factory	·	2.7 km	MPC · JPL
462783	2010 HB_{33}	—	April 7, 2010	Mount Lemmon	Mount Lemmon Survey	·	3.4 km	MPC · JPL
462784	2010 HO_{49}	—	April 17, 2005	Kitt Peak	Spacewatch	·	3.1 km	MPC · JPL
462785	2010 JU_{29}	—	April 8, 2010	Kitt Peak	Spacewatch	·	570 m	MPC · JPL
462786	2010 KT_{6}	—	February 13, 2010	Catalina	CSS	·	2.3 km	MPC · JPL
462787	2010 KU_{39}	—	May 19, 2010	Catalina	CSS	CYB	4.1 km	MPC · JPL
462788	2010 LS_{76}	—	October 15, 2001	Apache Point	SDSS	·	3.6 km	MPC · JPL
462789	2010 LY_{96}	—	June 13, 2010	WISE	WISE	PHO	1.8 km	MPC · JPL
462790	2010 MH_{103}	—	June 29, 2010	WISE	WISE	·	1.6 km	MPC · JPL
462791	2010 NG_{28}	—	July 7, 2010	WISE	WISE	·	1.5 km	MPC · JPL
462792	2010 OP_{29}	—	July 19, 2010	WISE	WISE	·	2.3 km	MPC · JPL
462793	2010 OG_{87}	—	March 19, 2009	Mount Lemmon	Mount Lemmon Survey	·	1.8 km	MPC · JPL
462794	2010 OM_{121}	—	July 30, 2010	WISE	WISE	·	2.3 km	MPC · JPL
462795	2010 OV_{123}	—	July 31, 2010	WISE	WISE	·	2.5 km	MPC · JPL
462796	2010 PY_{1}	—	November 3, 2000	Kitt Peak	Spacewatch	·	740 m	MPC · JPL
462797	2010 PY_{21}	—	August 4, 2010	WISE	WISE	·	1.7 km	MPC · JPL
462798	2010 PD_{40}	—	August 6, 2010	WISE	WISE	·	1.6 km	MPC · JPL
462799	2010 PT_{58}	—	August 9, 2010	Socorro	LINEAR	·	660 m	MPC · JPL
462800	2010 PT_{59}	—	June 20, 2010	Mount Lemmon	Mount Lemmon Survey	·	770 m	MPC · JPL

== 462801–462900 ==
back to top

Designation			Discovery			Properties		Ref
Permanent	Provisional	Named after	Date	Site	Discoverer(s)	Category	Diam.	Ref
462801	2010 PX_{62}	—	August 11, 2010	Socorro	LINEAR	·	1.9 km	MPC · JPL
462802	2010 PR_{74}	—	August 11, 2010	La Sagra	OAM	·	650 m	MPC · JPL
462803	2010 PC_{76}	—	August 10, 2010	Kitt Peak	Spacewatch	·	650 m	MPC · JPL
462804	2010 QU	—	August 19, 2010	Kitt Peak	Spacewatch	·	670 m	MPC · JPL
462805	2010 QR_{3}	—	August 16, 2010	La Sagra	OAM	NYS	1.1 km	MPC · JPL
462806	2010 RB_{2}	—	September 1, 2010	Socorro	LINEAR	·	1.3 km	MPC · JPL
462807	2010 RZ_{50}	—	September 27, 2003	Kitt Peak	Spacewatch	·	920 m	MPC · JPL
462808	2010 RG_{60}	—	November 13, 2006	Catalina	CSS	EUN	1.2 km	MPC · JPL
462809	2010 RY_{60}	—	September 18, 2003	Kitt Peak	Spacewatch	·	790 m	MPC · JPL
462810	2010 RU_{70}	—	September 9, 2010	Kitt Peak	Spacewatch	·	1.0 km	MPC · JPL
462811	2010 RY_{71}	—	September 10, 2010	La Sagra	OAM	·	660 m	MPC · JPL
462812	2010 RM_{78}	—	September 20, 2003	Kitt Peak	Spacewatch	·	670 m	MPC · JPL
462813	2010 RU_{78}	—	September 2, 2010	Mount Lemmon	Mount Lemmon Survey	V	630 m	MPC · JPL
462814	2010 RF_{102}	—	September 10, 2010	Kitt Peak	Spacewatch	·	1.5 km	MPC · JPL
462815	2010 RS_{102}	—	September 10, 2010	Kitt Peak	Spacewatch	·	1.0 km	MPC · JPL
462816	2010 RZ_{102}	—	April 19, 2006	Kitt Peak	Spacewatch	·	550 m	MPC · JPL
462817	2010 RZ_{107}	—	September 10, 2010	Kitt Peak	Spacewatch	·	990 m	MPC · JPL
462818	2010 RE_{115}	—	September 11, 2010	Kitt Peak	Spacewatch	V	660 m	MPC · JPL
462819	2010 RQ_{139}	—	September 4, 2010	Mount Lemmon	Mount Lemmon Survey	NYS	930 m	MPC · JPL
462820	2010 RG_{152}	—	September 16, 2003	Kitt Peak	Spacewatch	·	710 m	MPC · JPL
462821	2010 RH_{167}	—	September 2, 2010	Črni Vrh	Vales, J.	PHO	1.2 km	MPC · JPL
462822	2010 RT_{171}	—	March 2, 2006	Kitt Peak	Spacewatch	·	540 m	MPC · JPL
462823	2010 SE_{5}	—	September 16, 2010	Kitt Peak	Spacewatch	V	540 m	MPC · JPL
462824	2010 SG_{9}	—	September 28, 2003	Kitt Peak	Spacewatch	·	1.0 km	MPC · JPL
462825	2010 SP_{11}	—	January 1, 2008	Mount Lemmon	Mount Lemmon Survey	·	1.2 km	MPC · JPL
462826	2010 SE_{18}	—	April 2, 2006	Kitt Peak	Spacewatch	·	530 m	MPC · JPL
462827	2010 SP_{19}	—	October 23, 2003	Kitt Peak	Spacewatch	·	990 m	MPC · JPL
462828	2010 SN_{30}	—	September 9, 2010	Kitt Peak	Spacewatch	NYS	1.1 km	MPC · JPL
462829	2010 SR_{32}	—	September 30, 2010	Mount Lemmon	Mount Lemmon Survey	·	1.1 km	MPC · JPL
462830	2010 TB_{21}	—	October 17, 2006	Kitt Peak	Spacewatch	(5)	980 m	MPC · JPL
462831	2010 TQ_{31}	—	October 2, 2010	Kitt Peak	Spacewatch	·	1.2 km	MPC · JPL
462832	2010 TE_{70}	—	April 20, 2009	Mount Lemmon	Mount Lemmon Survey	·	980 m	MPC · JPL
462833	2010 TR_{84}	—	September 11, 2010	Kitt Peak	Spacewatch	·	860 m	MPC · JPL
462834	2010 TL_{99}	—	September 16, 2010	Kitt Peak	Spacewatch	·	1.0 km	MPC · JPL
462835	2010 TQ_{109}	—	September 16, 2010	Kitt Peak	Spacewatch	·	690 m	MPC · JPL
462836	2010 TY_{115}	—	September 16, 2010	Mount Lemmon	Mount Lemmon Survey	·	1.6 km	MPC · JPL
462837	2010 TH_{150}	—	October 6, 1999	Socorro	LINEAR	·	990 m	MPC · JPL
462838	2010 TV_{150}	—	November 3, 2003	Apache Point	SDSS	PHO	1.0 km	MPC · JPL
462839	2010 TM_{165}	—	October 20, 2006	Mount Lemmon	Mount Lemmon Survey	(5)	1.1 km	MPC · JPL
462840	2010 TR_{168}	—	October 13, 2010	Catalina	CSS	·	820 m	MPC · JPL
462841	2010 TA_{174}	—	October 7, 2010	Catalina	CSS	·	1.3 km	MPC · JPL
462842	2010 TK_{188}	—	December 17, 2006	Catalina	CSS	·	2.1 km	MPC · JPL
462843	2010 UH_{13}	—	March 28, 2009	Kitt Peak	Spacewatch	·	940 m	MPC · JPL
462844	2010 UG_{16}	—	November 16, 2006	Mount Lemmon	Mount Lemmon Survey	·	1.0 km	MPC · JPL
462845	2010 UE_{26}	—	October 28, 2010	Mount Lemmon	Mount Lemmon Survey	·	1.6 km	MPC · JPL
462846	2010 UT_{29}	—	October 17, 2010	Catalina	CSS	(1547)	1.5 km	MPC · JPL
462847	2010 US_{33}	—	November 14, 2006	Mount Lemmon	Mount Lemmon Survey	·	1.2 km	MPC · JPL
462848	2010 UO_{37}	—	October 29, 2010	Catalina	CSS	·	1.4 km	MPC · JPL
462849	2010 UB_{46}	—	August 17, 2006	Palomar	NEAT	·	1.3 km	MPC · JPL
462850	2010 UA_{49}	—	October 31, 2010	Mount Lemmon	Mount Lemmon Survey	·	1.2 km	MPC · JPL
462851	2010 UZ_{49}	—	April 22, 2009	Kitt Peak	Spacewatch	·	1.1 km	MPC · JPL
462852	2010 UH_{73}	—	November 23, 1997	Kitt Peak	Spacewatch	JUN	990 m	MPC · JPL
462853	2010 UV_{76}	—	October 30, 2010	Kitt Peak	Spacewatch	EUN	980 m	MPC · JPL
462854	2010 UU_{79}	—	November 23, 2006	Mount Lemmon	Mount Lemmon Survey	(5)	1.1 km	MPC · JPL
462855	2010 UY_{95}	—	March 21, 2004	Kitt Peak	Spacewatch	·	1.6 km	MPC · JPL
462856	2010 UR_{107}	—	July 22, 2010	WISE	WISE	·	910 m	MPC · JPL
462857	2010 VL_{16}	—	October 12, 2010	Mount Lemmon	Mount Lemmon Survey	·	1.3 km	MPC · JPL
462858	2010 VM_{18}	—	October 12, 2010	Mount Lemmon	Mount Lemmon Survey	·	1.4 km	MPC · JPL
462859	2010 VG_{23}	—	October 12, 2010	Mount Lemmon	Mount Lemmon Survey	·	940 m	MPC · JPL
462860	2010 VH_{29}	—	November 24, 2006	Kitt Peak	Spacewatch	(5)	1.0 km	MPC · JPL
462861	2010 VP_{33}	—	September 3, 2010	Mount Lemmon	Mount Lemmon Survey	·	1.3 km	MPC · JPL
462862	2010 VO_{37}	—	October 12, 2010	Mount Lemmon	Mount Lemmon Survey	·	1.2 km	MPC · JPL
462863	2010 VC_{42}	—	November 1, 2006	Mount Lemmon	Mount Lemmon Survey	(5)	890 m	MPC · JPL
462864	2010 VX_{45}	—	November 20, 2006	Kitt Peak	Spacewatch	(5)	1.1 km	MPC · JPL
462865	2010 VD_{46}	—	October 14, 2010	Mount Lemmon	Mount Lemmon Survey	·	1.1 km	MPC · JPL
462866	2010 VJ_{71}	—	August 27, 2006	Anderson Mesa	LONEOS	·	1.1 km	MPC · JPL
462867	2010 VF_{83}	—	November 5, 2010	Kitt Peak	Spacewatch	·	1.3 km	MPC · JPL
462868	2010 VT_{88}	—	October 29, 2010	Kitt Peak	Spacewatch	·	990 m	MPC · JPL
462869	2010 VR_{89}	—	November 20, 2006	Kitt Peak	Spacewatch	·	1.2 km	MPC · JPL
462870	2010 VT_{91}	—	November 21, 2006	Mount Lemmon	Mount Lemmon Survey	·	1.3 km	MPC · JPL
462871	2010 VB_{93}	—	October 1, 2010	Mount Lemmon	Mount Lemmon Survey	·	920 m	MPC · JPL
462872	2010 VQ_{96}	—	September 3, 2010	Mount Lemmon	Mount Lemmon Survey	·	2.3 km	MPC · JPL
462873	2010 VR_{96}	—	November 8, 2010	XuYi	PMO NEO Survey Program	RAF	750 m	MPC · JPL
462874	2010 VC_{106}	—	October 28, 2010	Mount Lemmon	Mount Lemmon Survey	·	1.3 km	MPC · JPL
462875	2010 VL_{110}	—	November 18, 2006	Kitt Peak	Spacewatch	·	1.2 km	MPC · JPL
462876	2010 VH_{114}	—	October 13, 2010	Mount Lemmon	Mount Lemmon Survey	·	1.1 km	MPC · JPL
462877	2010 VQ_{135}	—	November 1, 2010	Kitt Peak	Spacewatch	·	1.1 km	MPC · JPL
462878	2010 VX_{149}	—	September 5, 2010	Mount Lemmon	Mount Lemmon Survey	·	1.5 km	MPC · JPL
462879	2010 VA_{157}	—	October 9, 2010	Mount Lemmon	Mount Lemmon Survey	·	1.6 km	MPC · JPL
462880	2010 VU_{176}	—	November 5, 2010	Catalina	CSS	·	1.2 km	MPC · JPL
462881	2010 VH_{185}	—	October 30, 2010	Mount Lemmon	Mount Lemmon Survey	·	1.4 km	MPC · JPL
462882	2010 VW_{198}	—	October 28, 2010	Kitt Peak	Spacewatch	(5)	1.1 km	MPC · JPL
462883	2010 VT_{203}	—	September 30, 2010	Mount Lemmon	Mount Lemmon Survey	·	1.3 km	MPC · JPL
462884	2010 VL_{214}	—	November 13, 2006	Kitt Peak	Spacewatch	·	970 m	MPC · JPL
462885	2010 VL_{215}	—	November 16, 2006	Kitt Peak	Spacewatch	·	870 m	MPC · JPL
462886	2010 VD_{218}	—	October 4, 2006	Mount Lemmon	Mount Lemmon Survey	·	940 m	MPC · JPL
462887	2010 VD_{220}	—	November 23, 2006	Kitt Peak	Spacewatch	·	1.2 km	MPC · JPL
462888	2010 WJ_{2}	—	November 17, 2006	Mount Lemmon	Mount Lemmon Survey	PHO	1.2 km	MPC · JPL
462889	2010 WL_{9}	—	November 14, 2010	Mount Lemmon	Mount Lemmon Survey	·	1.4 km	MPC · JPL
462890	2010 WW_{11}	—	October 9, 2010	Mount Lemmon	Mount Lemmon Survey	·	1.7 km	MPC · JPL
462891	2010 WO_{17}	—	November 27, 2010	Mount Lemmon	Mount Lemmon Survey	·	1.1 km	MPC · JPL
462892	2010 WB_{26}	—	November 2, 2010	Kitt Peak	Spacewatch	·	1.6 km	MPC · JPL
462893	2010 WG_{29}	—	December 9, 2006	Kitt Peak	Spacewatch	·	1.0 km	MPC · JPL
462894	2010 WO_{34}	—	November 27, 2010	Mount Lemmon	Mount Lemmon Survey	·	1.2 km	MPC · JPL
462895	2010 WH_{63}	—	November 2, 2010	Kitt Peak	Spacewatch	·	1.3 km	MPC · JPL
462896	2010 XG_{1}	—	June 9, 2004	Kitt Peak	Spacewatch	·	2.3 km	MPC · JPL
462897	2010 XD_{23}	—	November 15, 2010	Kitt Peak	Spacewatch	·	940 m	MPC · JPL
462898	2010 XT_{34}	—	November 12, 2010	Mount Lemmon	Mount Lemmon Survey	·	1.8 km	MPC · JPL
462899	2010 XP_{43}	—	December 6, 2010	Mount Lemmon	Mount Lemmon Survey	(5)	1.2 km	MPC · JPL
462900	2010 XK_{44}	—	November 25, 2006	Kitt Peak	Spacewatch	·	1.2 km	MPC · JPL

== 462901–463000 ==
back to top

Designation			Discovery			Properties		Ref
Permanent	Provisional	Named after	Date	Site	Discoverer(s)	Category	Diam.	Ref
462901	2010 XL_{44}	—	December 12, 2006	Kitt Peak	Spacewatch	ADE	1.8 km	MPC · JPL
462902	2010 XZ_{46}	—	September 5, 2000	Apache Point	SDSS	·	2.0 km	MPC · JPL
462903	2010 XR_{48}	—	December 6, 2010	Catalina	CSS	BRG	1.7 km	MPC · JPL
462904	2010 XA_{58}	—	November 25, 2006	Kitt Peak	Spacewatch	·	1.4 km	MPC · JPL
462905	2010 XK_{63}	—	March 16, 2007	Kitt Peak	Spacewatch	AEO	1.1 km	MPC · JPL
462906	2010 XL_{67}	—	March 11, 2003	Kitt Peak	Spacewatch	·	1.5 km	MPC · JPL
462907	2010 XC_{71}	—	October 29, 2010	Mount Lemmon	Mount Lemmon Survey	·	1.3 km	MPC · JPL
462908	2010 XC_{75}	—	December 2, 2010	Mount Lemmon	Mount Lemmon Survey	·	1.4 km	MPC · JPL
462909	2010 XW_{77}	—	November 8, 2010	Kitt Peak	Spacewatch	MAR	1.3 km	MPC · JPL
462910	2010 XH_{80}	—	November 17, 2006	Mount Lemmon	Mount Lemmon Survey	·	1.4 km	MPC · JPL
462911	2010 YC_{4}	—	December 29, 2010	Catalina	CSS	·	2.1 km	MPC · JPL
462912	2011 AY_{1}	—	December 3, 2010	Kitt Peak	Spacewatch	·	1.7 km	MPC · JPL
462913	2011 AJ_{9}	—	November 7, 2010	Mount Lemmon	Mount Lemmon Survey	MIS	2.4 km	MPC · JPL
462914	2011 AZ_{13}	—	January 5, 2011	Catalina	CSS	·	1.7 km	MPC · JPL
462915	2011 AC_{21}	—	January 28, 2007	Kitt Peak	Spacewatch	·	1.6 km	MPC · JPL
462916	2011 AM_{38}	—	February 8, 2002	Kitt Peak	Spacewatch	·	2.1 km	MPC · JPL
462917	2011 AB_{61}	—	November 11, 2010	Mount Lemmon	Mount Lemmon Survey	·	1.7 km	MPC · JPL
462918	2011 AQ_{66}	—	January 14, 2011	Kitt Peak	Spacewatch	EOS	1.8 km	MPC · JPL
462919	2011 AD_{68}	—	January 9, 2006	Kitt Peak	Spacewatch	·	2.1 km	MPC · JPL
462920	2011 AH_{77}	—	March 14, 2007	Catalina	CSS	EUN	1.6 km	MPC · JPL
462921	2011 BF_{5}	—	February 6, 2002	Palomar	NEAT	·	1.8 km	MPC · JPL
462922	2011 BL_{6}	—	October 23, 2005	Catalina	CSS	·	1.6 km	MPC · JPL
462923	2011 BF_{9}	—	January 16, 2011	Mount Lemmon	Mount Lemmon Survey	·	1.7 km	MPC · JPL
462924	2011 BP_{13}	—	January 8, 2011	Mount Lemmon	Mount Lemmon Survey	·	2.1 km	MPC · JPL
462925	2011 BK_{14}	—	May 8, 2002	Socorro	LINEAR	·	3.1 km	MPC · JPL
462926	2011 BF_{15}	—	January 13, 2011	Catalina	CSS	·	1.9 km	MPC · JPL
462927	2011 BA_{26}	—	November 20, 2000	Apache Point	SDSS	·	1.9 km	MPC · JPL
462928	2011 BL_{29}	—	January 8, 2011	Mount Lemmon	Mount Lemmon Survey	·	2.4 km	MPC · JPL
462929	2011 BR_{29}	—	December 11, 2010	Kitt Peak	Spacewatch	·	1.8 km	MPC · JPL
462930	2011 BP_{30}	—	December 8, 2010	Mount Lemmon	Mount Lemmon Survey	·	2.2 km	MPC · JPL
462931	2011 BD_{37}	—	January 16, 2010	WISE	WISE	·	3.3 km	MPC · JPL
462932	2011 BW_{51}	—	January 7, 2006	Kitt Peak	Spacewatch	·	2.1 km	MPC · JPL
462933	2011 BY_{60}	—	December 13, 2010	Mount Lemmon	Mount Lemmon Survey	·	1.8 km	MPC · JPL
462934	2011 BP_{62}	—	January 13, 2002	Socorro	LINEAR	·	2.3 km	MPC · JPL
462935	2011 BT_{75}	—	May 11, 2007	Kitt Peak	Spacewatch	·	1.8 km	MPC · JPL
462936	2011 BS_{84}	—	December 19, 2001	Palomar	NEAT	·	1.7 km	MPC · JPL
462937	2011 BN_{86}	—	January 27, 2011	Mount Lemmon	Mount Lemmon Survey	·	1.4 km	MPC · JPL
462938	2011 BB_{98}	—	March 27, 2003	Kitt Peak	Spacewatch	·	1.4 km	MPC · JPL
462939	2011 BY_{104}	—	October 25, 2009	Kitt Peak	Spacewatch	AGN	940 m	MPC · JPL
462940	2011 BJ_{106}	—	October 30, 2005	Catalina	CSS	JUN	1.2 km	MPC · JPL
462941	2011 BQ_{107}	—	January 17, 2010	WISE	WISE	·	1.4 km	MPC · JPL
462942	2011 BT_{116}	—	December 5, 2010	Mount Lemmon	Mount Lemmon Survey	·	1.8 km	MPC · JPL
462943	2011 BQ_{130}	—	September 7, 2004	Kitt Peak	Spacewatch	·	1.4 km	MPC · JPL
462944	2011 BO_{152}	—	December 25, 2005	Kitt Peak	Spacewatch	HOF	2.2 km	MPC · JPL
462945	2011 CS_{10}	—	December 9, 2010	Mount Lemmon	Mount Lemmon Survey	·	2.1 km	MPC · JPL
462946	2011 CY_{11}	—	September 15, 2009	Kitt Peak	Spacewatch	·	1.5 km	MPC · JPL
462947	2011 CW_{16}	—	February 10, 2002	Socorro	LINEAR	·	1.7 km	MPC · JPL
462948	2011 CY_{19}	—	March 16, 2007	Mount Lemmon	Mount Lemmon Survey	·	1.4 km	MPC · JPL
462949	2011 CQ_{20}	—	November 25, 2005	Mount Lemmon	Mount Lemmon Survey	·	1.4 km	MPC · JPL
462950	2011 CV_{24}	—	May 22, 2003	Kitt Peak	Spacewatch	·	2.1 km	MPC · JPL
462951	2011 CM_{49}	—	January 12, 2011	Mount Lemmon	Mount Lemmon Survey	KOR	1.1 km	MPC · JPL
462952	2011 CD_{63}	—	January 30, 2011	Mount Lemmon	Mount Lemmon Survey	KOR	1.2 km	MPC · JPL
462953	2011 CK_{63}	—	October 24, 2009	Kitt Peak	Spacewatch	·	1.6 km	MPC · JPL
462954	2011 CC_{64}	—	March 10, 2007	Mount Lemmon	Mount Lemmon Survey	·	1.9 km	MPC · JPL
462955	2011 CX_{65}	—	September 7, 2008	Mount Lemmon	Mount Lemmon Survey	·	2.4 km	MPC · JPL
462956	2011 CR_{71}	—	October 26, 2009	Mount Lemmon	Mount Lemmon Survey	·	1.6 km	MPC · JPL
462957	2011 CA_{101}	—	April 14, 2007	Mount Lemmon	Mount Lemmon Survey	·	1.8 km	MPC · JPL
462958	2011 CT_{110}	—	July 29, 2008	Mount Lemmon	Mount Lemmon Survey	EOS	1.9 km	MPC · JPL
462959	2011 DU	—	February 22, 2011	Kitt Peak	Spacewatch	APO · PHA	220 m	MPC · JPL
462960	2011 DT_{8}	—	January 8, 2011	Mount Lemmon	Mount Lemmon Survey	·	2.1 km	MPC · JPL
462961	2011 DP_{30}	—	October 22, 2009	Mount Lemmon	Mount Lemmon Survey	·	2.5 km	MPC · JPL
462962	2011 DV_{45}	—	August 16, 2001	Palomar	NEAT	·	3.9 km	MPC · JPL
462963	2011 DQ_{50}	—	February 4, 2006	Kitt Peak	Spacewatch	·	2.3 km	MPC · JPL
462964	2011 DE_{51}	—	January 6, 2006	Catalina	CSS	·	2.1 km	MPC · JPL
462965	2011 EF_{4}	—	March 4, 2006	Mount Lemmon	Mount Lemmon Survey	·	1.7 km	MPC · JPL
462966	2011 EF_{25}	—	March 5, 2011	Kitt Peak	Spacewatch	·	2.3 km	MPC · JPL
462967	2011 EY_{27}	—	February 23, 2011	Kitt Peak	Spacewatch	·	1.6 km	MPC · JPL
462968	2011 EJ_{30}	—	February 24, 2006	Palomar	NEAT	·	2.1 km	MPC · JPL
462969	2011 ES_{38}	—	March 11, 2010	WISE	WISE	·	1.7 km	MPC · JPL
462970	2011 EK_{43}	—	September 30, 2007	Kitt Peak	Spacewatch	·	3.7 km	MPC · JPL
462971	2011 EY_{56}	—	November 26, 2003	Kitt Peak	Spacewatch	·	3.4 km	MPC · JPL
462972	2011 EA_{57}	—	September 20, 2003	Palomar	NEAT	·	2.6 km	MPC · JPL
462973	2011 EL_{61}	—	March 12, 2011	Mount Lemmon	Mount Lemmon Survey	·	2.3 km	MPC · JPL
462974	2011 EC_{67}	—	September 27, 2003	Kitt Peak	Spacewatch	KOR	1.2 km	MPC · JPL
462975	2011 EC_{69}	—	January 28, 2000	Kitt Peak	Spacewatch	·	2.1 km	MPC · JPL
462976	2011 ER_{69}	—	March 10, 2011	Kitt Peak	Spacewatch	·	2.2 km	MPC · JPL
462977	2011 EP_{77}	—	January 28, 2000	Kitt Peak	Spacewatch	·	2.1 km	MPC · JPL
462978	2011 EV_{78}	—	April 4, 2010	WISE	WISE	·	3.8 km	MPC · JPL
462979	2011 EH_{79}	—	March 14, 2011	Mount Lemmon	Mount Lemmon Survey	·	1.7 km	MPC · JPL
462980	2011 EP_{82}	—	September 3, 2008	Kitt Peak	Spacewatch	·	1.5 km	MPC · JPL
462981	2011 EE_{83}	—	February 4, 2006	Kitt Peak	Spacewatch	·	2.6 km	MPC · JPL
462982	2011 EV_{83}	—	October 7, 2004	Kitt Peak	Spacewatch	MRX	1.1 km	MPC · JPL
462983	2011 FL	—	December 16, 2004	Kitt Peak	Spacewatch	EOS	1.9 km	MPC · JPL
462984	2011 FW	—	February 9, 2006	Palomar	NEAT	BRA	1.8 km	MPC · JPL
462985	2011 FM_{8}	—	September 26, 2008	Kitt Peak	Spacewatch	EOS	1.8 km	MPC · JPL
462986	2011 FL_{12}	—	March 26, 2011	Kitt Peak	Spacewatch	THM	1.8 km	MPC · JPL
462987	2011 FC_{13}	—	September 10, 2007	Kitt Peak	Spacewatch	·	3.1 km	MPC · JPL
462988	2011 FG_{26}	—	March 14, 2011	Catalina	CSS	·	3.3 km	MPC · JPL
462989	2011 FO_{33}	—	October 25, 2008	Kitt Peak	Spacewatch	EOS	2.2 km	MPC · JPL
462990	2011 FW_{33}	—	March 28, 2011	Mount Lemmon	Mount Lemmon Survey	·	2.9 km	MPC · JPL
462991	2011 FS_{41}	—	March 26, 2011	Mount Lemmon	Mount Lemmon Survey	·	3.2 km	MPC · JPL
462992	2011 FY_{41}	—	March 26, 2011	Mount Lemmon	Mount Lemmon Survey	·	2.4 km	MPC · JPL
462993	2011 FG_{46}	—	April 19, 2006	Kitt Peak	Spacewatch	·	1.9 km	MPC · JPL
462994	2011 FR_{46}	—	March 29, 2011	Kitt Peak	Spacewatch	H	440 m	MPC · JPL
462995	2011 FD_{68}	—	March 27, 2011	Mount Lemmon	Mount Lemmon Survey	·	2.1 km	MPC · JPL
462996	2011 FT_{74}	—	September 4, 2008	Kitt Peak	Spacewatch	·	2.1 km	MPC · JPL
462997	2011 FQ_{75}	—	April 26, 2006	Kitt Peak	Spacewatch	THM	2.1 km	MPC · JPL
462998	2011 FL_{90}	—	February 10, 2011	Mount Lemmon	Mount Lemmon Survey	·	2.2 km	MPC · JPL
462999	2011 FT_{103}	—	January 27, 2006	Mount Lemmon	Mount Lemmon Survey	·	2.1 km	MPC · JPL
463000	2011 FQ_{105}	—	December 10, 2004	Kitt Peak	Spacewatch	·	2.8 km	MPC · JPL

back to top

== Meaning of names ==
As minor planet discoveries are confirmed, they are given a permanent number by the IAU's Minor Planet Center (MPC), and the discoverers can then submit names for them, following the IAU's naming conventions. The list below concerns those minor planets in the specified number-range that have received names, and explains the meanings of those names.

Official naming citations of newly named small Solar System bodies are approved and published in a bulletin by IAU's Working Group for Small Bodies Nomenclature (WGSBN). Before May 2021, citations were published in MPC's Minor Planet Circulars for many decades. Recent citations can also be found on the JPL Small-Body Database (SBDB). Until his death in 2016, German astronomer Lutz D. Schmadel compiled these citations into the Dictionary of Minor Planet Names (DMP) and regularly updated the collection.

Based on Paul Herget's The Names of the Minor Planets, Schmadel also researched the unclear origin of numerous asteroids, most of which had been named prior to World War II. This article incorporates text from this source, which is in the public domain: SBDB New namings may only be added to this list below after official publication as the preannouncement of names is condemned. The WGSBN publishes a comprehensive guideline for the naming rules of non-cometary small Solar System bodies.

Named minor planet	Provisional	This minor planet was named for...	Ref · Catalog
462078 Carlosbriones	2007 FS_{4}	Carlos Briones, a Spanish scientist and writer	IAU · 462078
