= October 1970 (disambiguation) =

October 1970 is a month of 1970.

October 1970 may also refer to:

- The October Crisis, a terrorism incident in Quebec
- October 1970 (film), a TV miniseries based on the October Crisis
