= September 1970 =

Month of 1970

<<	September 1970					>>
Su	Mo	Tu	We	Th	Fr	Sa
		1	2	3	4	5
6	7	8	9	10	11	12
13	14	15	16	17	18	19
20	21	22	23	24	25	26
27	28	29	30

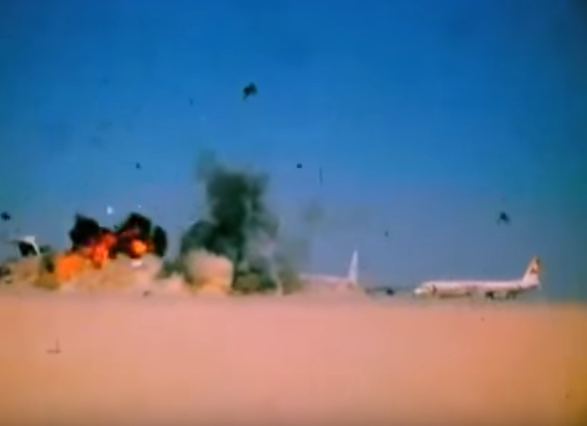
September 6–12, 1970: Palestinian terrorists hijack four airplanes, destroy one after evacuating occupants

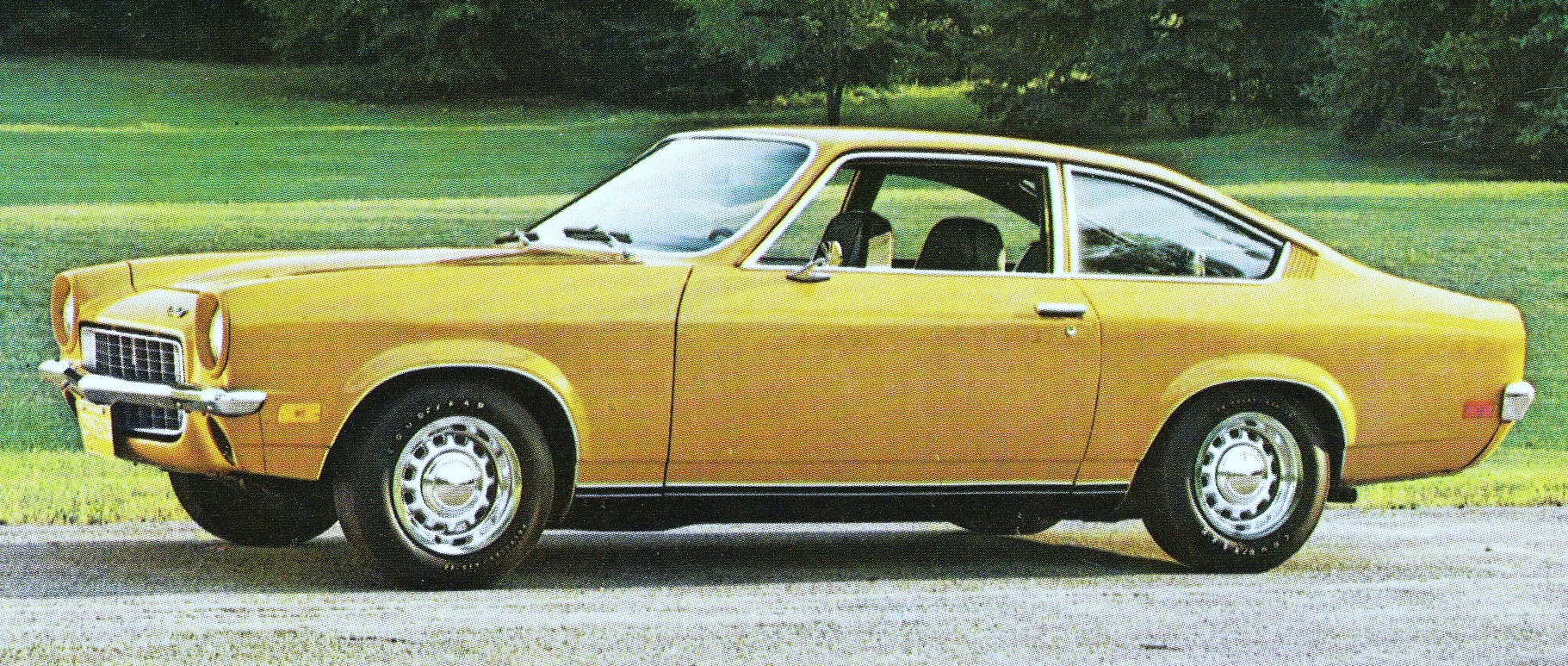
September 10, 1970: Chevrolet introduces the Vega

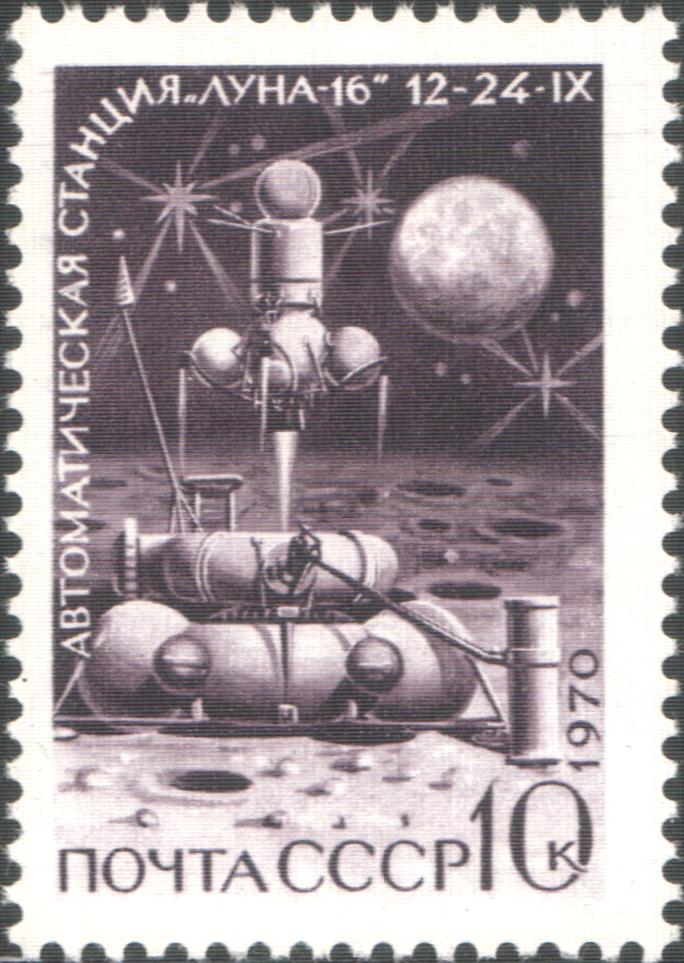
September 12–24, 1970: Soviet probe Luna 16 lands on Moon, brings back 3½ ounces of lunar soil

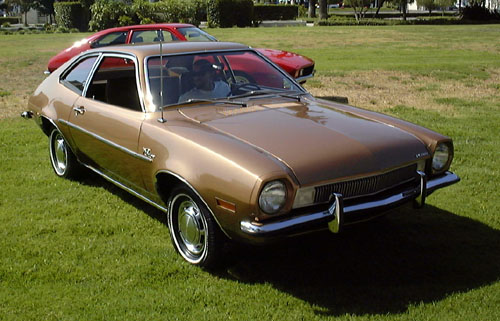
September 11, 1970: Ford Motor introduces the Pinto

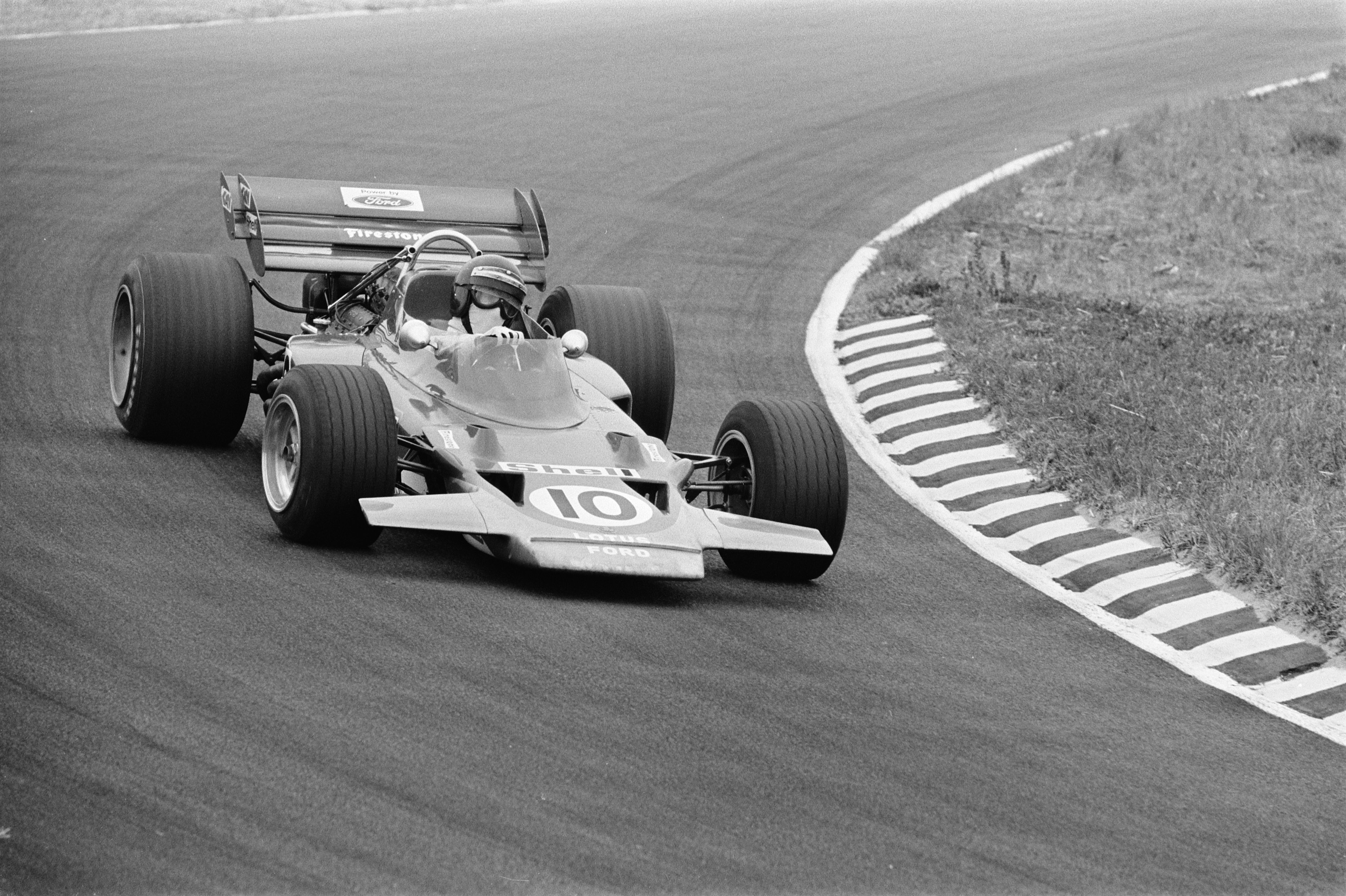
September 5, 1970: Future World Driving Champion Jochen Rindt killed in auto crash

The following events occurred in September 1970:

== September 1, 1970 (Tuesday) ==
- An assassination attempt was made in against King Hussein of Jordan as his motorcade approached a railway underpass in Amman. The King and his entourage were on their way to the airport to greet the arrival of his daughter, Princess Alia, and the attack happened a few minutes before she was scheduled to land. Hussein was unharmed, and was able to divert the incoming Jordanian airliner to neighboring Beirut. The attempt on the monarch's life precipitated the Black September in Jordan crisis that would see more than 10,000 Palestinian Jordanians killed in less than a week.
- The cabinet of the government of Israel voted to promote the status of the 35,000 members of the Arabic-speaking Druze community, abolishing their classification as a minority group (which applied to Arab Muslims, Arab Christians, Samaritans and Circassians). The reclassification of the Druze, many of whom had fought for the Israeli Army, was the next step to full Israeli citizenship.
- The U.S. Senate voted not to approve a resolution by Senators George S. McGovern (D-South Dakota) and Mark O. Hatfield (R-Oregon) to force U.S. President Nixon to withdraw all American troops from Indochina by December 31, 1971. The vote to curb an American president's war powers had 39 supporters (including seven Republicans) and 55 voting against it.
- The "Agreement on the International Carriage of Perishable Foodstuffs and on the Special Equipment to be used for such Carriage", commonly called the ATP Treaty was signed in Geneva by seven Western European nations.
- Hapag-Lloyd AG, one of the world's largest shipping container companies, was created by the merger of the Hamburg America Line (Hamburg-Amerikanische Paketfahrt-Aktien-Gesellschaft or HAPAG) and North German Lloyd.
- Born:
  - Hwang Jung-min, South Korean film star, in Masan, South Gyeongsang Province
  - Max Pollak, Austrian dancer, in Vienna.
- Died:
  - François Mauriac, 84, French novelist and 1952 laureate of the Nobel Prize in Literature
  - Agnes E. Meyer, 83, American journalist, philanthropist and activist

== September 2, 1970 (Wednesday) ==
- Astronauts would no longer be sent to the Moon after 1972, as NASA announced the cancellation of the Apollo 18 and Apollo 19 missions to the Moon, which had been scheduled for 1973 and 1974, respectively. The Apollo 20 mission had been canceled on January 4, 1970. The original mission of Apollo 15, less than 24 hours at the Censorinus crater, was replaced by Apollo 18's schedule for an extended mission of three days on the Moon at the Hadley Rille. The scrubbing of the missions was estimated to save $42.1 million in the upcoming fiscal year, but also meant the layoff of 700 NASA employees.
- Britain attempted its first launch of an orbital satellite from the RAAF Woomera Range Complex in South Australia. The Black Arrow rocket lifted off successfully, but the second stage had a leak in its high-test peroxide (HTP) tank pressurization system and shut down 15 seconds too soon. The rocket and its payload (the Orba satellite) lacked sufficient propulsion to reach orbit, and the Orba crashed into the Gulf of Carpentaria off Australia's northern coast.
- The crash of Aeroflot Flight 3630 in the Soviet Union killed all 32 passengers and 5 crew. The Tu-124 had departed from Rostov-on-Don on a flight to Vilnius. The pilot lost control of the airliner at an altitude of 9,000 metres (30,000 ft) and, in a common occurrence at the time, the censored Soviet press did not publish news of the incident.
- Died:
  - General Marie-Pierre Kœnig, 71, French military officer and former French Minister of Defense
  - Kees van Baaren, 63, Dutch classical composer

== September 3, 1970 (Thursday) ==
- All 21 people on Aeroflot Flight W-4 were killed in the crash of a Yak-40 commuter plane, after the pilot flew into the side of a mountain. The plane had departed Frunze in the Kirghiz SSR on a flight to Leninabad in the Tadzhik SSR, and was nearing its destination when it hit a 2,300 m (7,500 ft) peak at an altitude of 2,100 m (6,900 ft).
- After being alerted by Israel that the Soviet Union and Egypt were placing missiles on the west side of the Suez Canal, in violation of the ceasefire agreement in the Middle East, the United States presented aerial photographic evidence to the foreign ministries in Moscow and in Cairo and asked for the withdrawal of the new weapons
- Born: Jeremy Glick, American business executive known for fighting the 9/11 hijackers of United Flight 93; in Saddle River, New Jersey (killed 2001)
- Died:
  - Vince Lombardi, 57, legendary American professional football coach who guided the Green Bay Packers to six NFL titles; from colon cancer
  - Alan Wilson, 27, American rock musician and co-founder of the group Canned Heat, died of barbiturate overdose.

== September 4, 1970 (Friday) ==
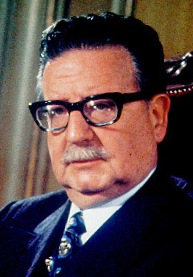
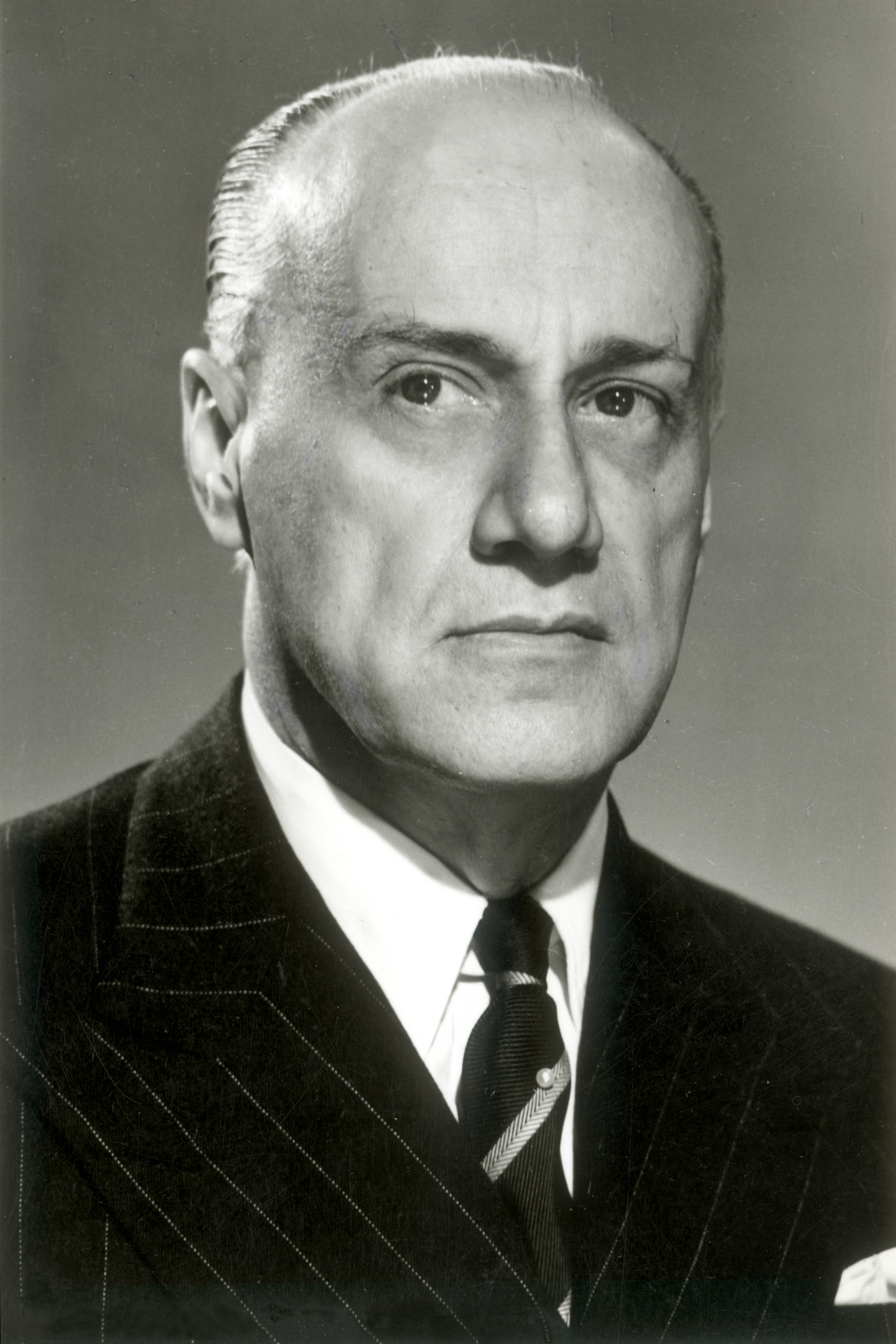
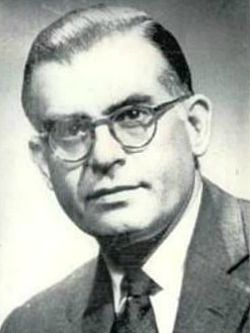
Allende, Alessandri and Tomic
- Chileans voted for a new President and Marxist Senator Salvador Allende of the Socialist Party of Chile received more votes than his two opponents, former President Jorge Alessandri and Christian Democrat Radomiro Tomic. Under the South American nation's constitution, if no candidate received a majority of the popular votes, a joint session of the Chilean Congress would choose from the top two vote recipients. The joint session was scheduled to take place on October 24. Allende had a plurality of 36.2% of the votes and Alessandri had 34.9%, while Tomic was third with 27.8%. Allende would be selected, and would take office on November 3.
- Soviet Russian prima ballerina Natalia Makarova defected to the West while on tour with the Kirov Ballet in London.

== September 5, 1970 (Saturday) ==
- Formula One driver Jochen Rindt was killed during qualifying races for the Italian Grand Prix at Monza. His Lotus 72 race car lost its right front wheel and veered into a guard rail at 205 mph (330 km/h). The 28-year old driver from Austria had won five of the first nine races on the 1970 Grand Prix circuit, including four in a row in the summer, and told reporters before his run, "Last year I had a lot of bad luck, but this year it has changed." After the 12th and penultimate race of the circuit, all other challengers for the World Driving Championship had been mathematically eliminated and Rindt won the title posthumously based on the points he had collected in finishes before his death.
- In Creston, British Columbia, Dale Nelson murdered eight people in a killing spree. Nelson was arrested after a two-day manhunt.
- In Vietnam, the 101st Airborne Division of the U.S. Army and the South Vietnamese 1st Infantry Division began Operation Jefferson Glenn in a 13-month long campaign to drive the Viet Cong from the Thua Thien Province. The campaign was the last major operation by American ground forces during the Vietnam War. The 101st Airborne constructed three firebases and gradually turned over responsibility for the operation to the South Vietnamese Army's 1st Infantry Division, withdrawing on October 8. Four days after the operation's end, President Nixon would announce that U.S. troops would operate only for defensive purposes.
- Born: Johnny Vegas (stage name for Michael Joseph Pennington), English comedian and actor, St Helens, Lancashire
- Died:
  - Jesse Pennington, 87, English soccer football left-back with 25 appearances in the England national team
  - André Simon, 93, French wine expert and connoisseur

== September 6, 1970 (Sunday) ==
- Four passenger aircraft were hijacked on the same day in an operation carried out by the Popular Front for the Liberation of Palestine (PFLP), which boarded airliners from four different airlines (Pan Am, TWA and Swissair) that were departing for Europe from New York's John F. Kennedy International Airport. At 11:20 UTC (12:20 pm in Frankfurt), TWA Flight 741, a Boeing 707, was hijacked with 155 on board. Almost an hour later, at 12:14 UTC (1:14 pm in Zürich), Swissair Flight 100, a DC-8 with 155 people was taken control of. Half an hour later (12:45 UTC and 1:45 pm in Amsterdam), two terrorists attempted to take control of El Al Flight 219, but the plan was thwarted by the crew and the plane landed in London. Almost two hours after that (14:30 UTC and 3:30 pm in Amsterdam) two passengers who had been removed from the El Al Flight hijacked Pan Am Flight 93, a Boeing 747 with 175 people was successfully taken. The TWA and Swissair jets landed at Dawson Field, an airstrip in the desert of Jordan near Zarqa. The 747, too large to land at the airstrip, flew to Beirut where it was refueled and wired with explosives as nine more PFLP terrorists boarded and the plane was flown to Cairo. The passengers and crew were allowed to evacuate after the plane landed and the time bomb on board then destroyed the empty Boeing 747, which had cost $20,000,000.
- India's President, V. V. Giri, issued an executive order to the 320 rulers of India's former princely states informing them that under the power recently given him under Article 366(22), recognition of their special privileges would cease and the privy purses that 278 of the 320 received as income would be halted. The move came a day after the Rajya Sabha, upper house of India's parliament, failed to endorse the constitutional amendment bill that had passed the lower house (the Lok Sabha) at the beginning of the year. Although the vote was 149 in favor and 75 against the measure, it fell one vote shy of the required two-thirds majority needed for amendments. A few months later, India's Supreme Court would strike down the presidential ruling as unconstitutional, leading to the amendment of Article 363 of the Constitution to discontinue the privileges permanently.
- The new Ontario Motor Speedway opened in Ontario, California, 40 miles (64 km) from Los Angeles, with the first running of its USAC Indy-car race, the California 500. A crowd of 180,223 watched "one of the most dramatic 500-mile finishes in history" as Jim McElreath crossed the finish line two seconds ahead of Art Pollard.
- Clay Regazzoni won the 1970 Italian Grand Prix at the Autodromo Nazionale Monza, the 10th of 12 Grand Prix races in the 1970 season. The event was overshadowed by the death of Jochen Rindt at Monza the day before.
- Jimi Hendrix performed his final concert, in an appearance on the West German island of Fehmarn. He was found dead 12 days later in London.

== September 7, 1970 (Monday) ==
- At 1023 local time, the oil tanker ship Irving Whale sank in the Gulf of St. Lawrence in Canada, about 32 nautical miles (37 mi) northeast of North Cape, Prince Edward Island and 54 nautical miles (62 mi) southwest of Quebec's Magdalen Islands.
- The Vietnam Television network (Vo tuyen Truyen hinh Viet Nam) (VTV) began broadcasting in North Vietnam as an extension of the Voice of Vietnam radio network.
- On Mexico's Telesistema Mexicano television network (later Televisa), the news show 24 Horas debuted and became one of Mexico's most watched news programs. The host, journalist Jacobo Zabludovsky, anchored the newscast for almost three decades until the show's retirement in 1998.
- The Austrian weekly newsmagazine Profil published its first issue.
- Born:
  - Gao Min, Chinese springboard diver, Olympic gold medalist in 1988 and 1992, women's world champion in 1986 and 1991; in Zigong, Sichuan
  - Tom Everett Scott, American film actor, in East Bridgewater, Massachusetts
- Died: Yitzhak Gruenbaum, 90, Zionist activist and Israel's first Interior Minister

== September 8, 1970 (Tuesday) ==
- A Douglas DC-8 jetliner, on its way from New York to Washington where it was to be used as Trans International Airlines Flight 863, crashed during takeoff, killing all 11 of its crew, including seven stewardesses. After the jet lifted off from the runway, one of its four engines caught fire at an altitude of 200 feet (61 m) and the jet crashed on its side. If the engine had failed during Flight 863's scheduled trip from Washington to London, the DC-8 would have had 184 passengers in addition to the crew.
- A team of astronomers at the Jet Propulsion Laboratory (JPL) in Pasadena, California released the first map of the planet Venus, whose surface is obscured by thick clouds. On 16 occasions between March 11 and May 16, 1969, the JPL team had transmitted radar signals through the clouds, from a 210 ft (64 m) diameter dish antenna in the desert near Barstow, then received the faint echo back for each bit of data, then spent more than a year in compiling a map from the results. The area covered was described as a section "larger than the continent of Asia" 8,500 miles (13,700 km) wide and 8,500 miles (13,700 km) long along the Venusian equator.
- G. Harrold Carswell, who had resigned from a lifetime appointment as a federal judge in order to run for the U.S. Senate from Florida, lost to Congressman William C. Cramer in the Republican Party primary. Carswell, who had been rejected by the U.S. Senate after being nominated for a seat on the Supreme Court, had quit his position on the Fifth Circuit Court of Appeals in a bid to work against the senators who had subjected him to what he described as an "inquisition". The race was not even close, and Carswell received less than 35% of the votes cast. Senate Republican Leader Hugh Scott commented the next day, "I think Carswell was asking for it, and got what he deserved." Cramer, in turn, lost in the U.S. Senate election to Democrat Lawton Chiles in November.
- John Kirby applied for the patent on the first electronic pill counter for pharmacies, revolutionizing the counting of prescription medications. The Kirby system went on sale to pharmacies in Britain at the beginning of 1971.
- Alexandra Park Racecourse in London closed after 102 years. Noting the continued financial losses at "the only racecourse Londoners could really call their own", nicknamed "Ally Pally", sportswriter Derek Malcolm noted "even at its best it was hardly a masterpiece of planning" and observed that the track had been laid out "in the shape of a frying pan, so that wherever you stood on the stands you could only see half the longer races". The final race, of one mile and five furlongs was won by the racehorse "Sunset Fair" with 8 to 1 odds.
- Born:
  - Latrell Sprewell, controversial American basketball player and NBA all-star guard; in Milwaukee
  - U.S. Army Major Nidal Hasan, American psychiatrist and mass murderer who killed 13 fellow servicemen in 2009 at Fort Hood; in Arlington, Virginia

== September 9, 1970 (Wednesday) ==
- With 300 hostages from three hijacked airplanes, Palestinian guerrillas hijacked a fourth airliner, BOAC Flight 775, that had a crew of 10 and 113 passengers, including 21 schoolchildren and several members of the royal family of Bahrain. The VC-10 jet was seized after taking off from Bahrain toward London, and then landed at the Dawson's Field airstrip where two other hijacked jets were kept.
- A Cambodian Army amphibious force of 1,500 men, acting without support from foreign troops, broke the siege of Kompong Thom after three months, driving out North Vietnamese and Khmer Rouge forces. Reportedly, the scarcity of food in the provincial capital had reached the point that the city's defenders ate some of the city zoo's animals.

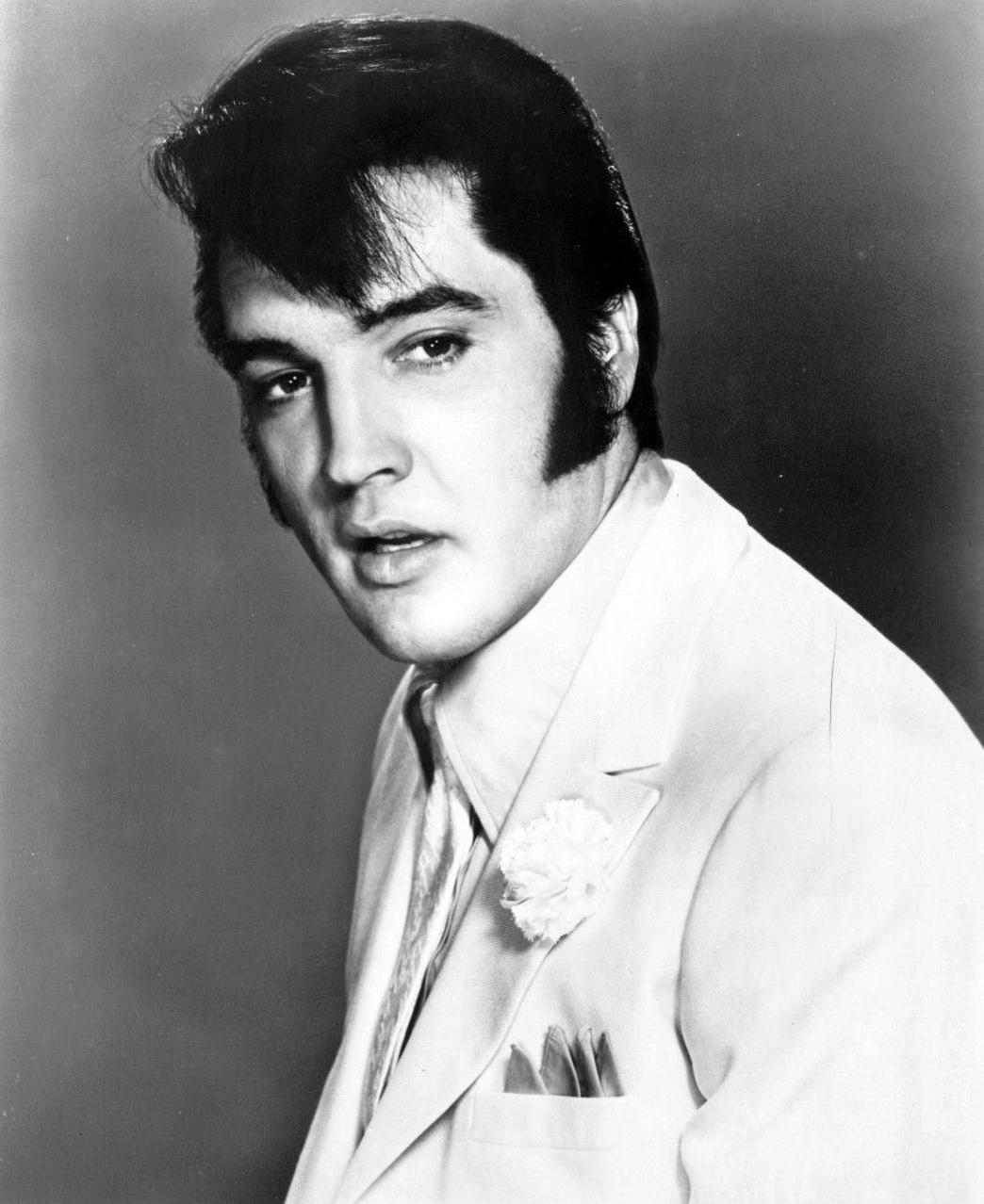
Presley

- Elvis Presley began his first concert tour in more than 12 years, after years of having performed regularly in Las Vegas. Presley opened in Phoenix, Arizona, and, over a period of six day, played at arenas in St. Louis, Detroit, Miami (two shows), Tampa, and Mobile, Alabama. He would stage more than 30 additional tours afterward until his death in 1977.
- Born:
  - Nhu Quynh, Vietnamese pop singer, in Dong Ha, Quang Tri Province, South Vietnam
  - Biju Menon, Indian film actor in Malayalam-language films; in Trichur (now Thrissur), Kerala state

== September 10, 1970 (Thursday) ==
- The Chevrolet Vega, General Motors' entry into the "subcompact car" market, was introduced at 6,300 dealerships in the U.S., with the slogan "Chevy's New Little Car Is Open for Business". The price for the first model, the Vega 2300, was $2,091. John Z. DeLorean, at the time the general manager of GM's Chevrolet division, said that the car was "unlike any other Chevrolet ever built" adding that "It meets the growing desire for an American-built car which— besides being small in size— is fun to drive, safe, comfortable, economical to own and operate, easy to maintain and long lasting in both construction and styling." The Vega would go on sale in Canada on September 28.
- Almost a year after the government of Bolivia had nationalized the oil industry, a spokesman for the president, General Alfredo Ovando Candia, announced that the Gulf Oil Corporation would be paid $78,600,000 over a 20-year period as compensation for the seizure of Bolivia Gulf Company. Gulf Oil, a U.S. company, had started production in the South American nation in 1955, and had invested $140,000,000 in its development until the nationalization was ordered on October 17, 1969.

== September 11, 1970 (Friday) ==
- The Ford Pinto, the second subcompact from the Ford Motor Company (after the Ford Maverick) was introduced in the United States and Canada. Overshadowing GM's roll-out of the new Vega the day before, Ford announced that the car would sell for $170 less, for only $1,919, an announcement that "cost most industry observers off guard". As part of the company's marketing, the first Ford Pinto was sold in Maryland to an elementary school teacher, Mr. Pinto, who lived in Pinto, Maryland.
- A tornado in the Italian city of Venice killed 35 people and injured more than 500. Of those, 19 had been aboard a vaporetto, one of the public transportation water buses used by municipal passengers, after the watercraft lifted into the air from a canal and turned upside down. Another 13 were killed at camping sites on the mainland.
- Operation Tailwind, a three-day long, covert U.S. Special Forces operation into Laos, began with 16 Green Berets and 140 Vietnamese Montagnards making an incursion from South Vietnam. The group encountered heavy resistance from the North Vietnamese Army (NVA) and destroyed an enemy base camp before being extracted by U.S. helicopters that fired tear gas in order to keep the NVA at a distance". The secret mission went unreported by the media for almost 28 years, until June 7, 1998, when CNN (the U.S.-based Cable News Network) broadcast a false news story that one author would describe as "the biggest news scandal of the 1990s". CNN fired two of its producers and longtime war correspondent Peter Arnett, issuing a retraction and an apology, after an investigation failed to substantiate their claims that Operation Tailwind had used Sarin nerve gas and that the mission had been to kill American servicemen who deserted.

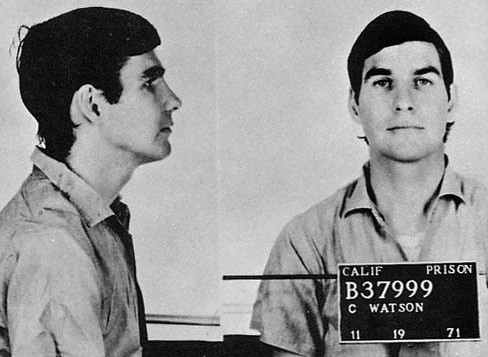
Charles "Tex" Watson

- Tex Watson, who had been charged with carrying out the August 1969 stabbing murders of Sharon Tate and six other people on the orders of Charles Manson, was extradited to California after having been held in a Texas jail on a different charge. Watson would later be convicted on seven counts of first degree murder. As of 2020, he continues to serve a sentence of life imprisonment.
- Born:
  - Taraji P. Henson, African-American film and TV actress, Golden Globe and SAG Award winner; in Washington, DC
  - Laura Wright, American TV actress and Daytime Emmy Award winner; as Laura Sisk in Washington, DC

== September 12, 1970 (Saturday) ==
- The Sky Marshal Program began on airline flights in the United States, the day after U.S. President Nixon announced that armed agents of the U.S. Department of the Treasury began serving on flights of U.S.-based airlines. Citing "the menace of air piracy" from the increasingly frequent hijacking of airline flights, Nixon announced that specially trained guards would be assigned to selected flights without advance notice. He also ordered the U.S. Department of Transportation to expand the use of walk-through metal detectors to 22 international airports, as well as "appropriate" domestic airports and terminals of U.S. airlines in other nations. An author would note later, "The original Sky Marshal Program... had some success but proved incapable of stopping hijackings," and that Lt. Gen. Benjamin O. Davis "recognized the need to switch primary security efforts from the aircraft to the ground"
- The Soviet Union launched Luna 16, an uncrewed lunar probe, stating only that the spacecraft would "carry out exploration of the Moon and near-Moon space."
- Dr. Timothy Leary, a former Harvard University professor and advocate of recreational drug use, escaped from the California Men's Colony West, near San Luis Obispo, where he had been serving a prison sentence for possession of marijuana Having gotten a job in the prison yard as a gardener, Leary climbed over the wall of the minimum security institution along a telephone wire, then located a pickup truck that had been parked nearby by the Weather Underground radical group. The group then smuggled Leary and his wife to Algeria. He would remain a fugitive for more than two years, until being arrested in Afghanistan and brought back to the U.S. on January 18, 1973
- Eight days after Salvador Allende's success in the Chilean presidential election, U.S. National Security Adviser Henry Kissinger contacted CIA Director Richard Helms and first discussed plans for an American-funded coup d'etat once Allende took office. In a phone conversation, Kissinger told Helms, "We will not let Chile go down the drain."
- In one of the first games of the 1970 college football season, the visiting USC Trojans defeated the Alabama Crimson Tide, 42 to 21, in Birmingham, marking the first time that Alabama, still an all-white team, had hosted a racially integrated team at home. A documentary about the historic game would be made in 2013, disclosing that Tide coach Bear Bryant had traveled to Los Angeles earlier in 1970 to arrange the game with Trojans coach John McKay, and theorize that Bryant had invited USC in order to show Tide supporters that Alabama needed to recruit African-American players. John Mitchell Jr. would become the first black player for the Tide in 1971.
- Died:
  - Noel Field, 66, U.S. State Department employee who was working as a spy for the Soviet Union and defected
  - James Smith Richardson, 86, Scottish travel book author

== September 13, 1970 (Sunday) ==
- An arsonist set fire to the Ponet Square Hotel at 1249 South Grand Avenue in Los Angeles, killing 19 residents in what was, at the time, the most deadly structure fire in the city's history On October 9, police arrested one of the survivors, Alejandro C. Figueroa, a former mental patient who had come under suspicion after being one of the few people to flee the early-morning blaze fully dressed Figueroa was convicted of 19 counts of murder on May 17 and sentenced to life imprisonment
- The PFLP released 257 of the 312 hostages that it had taken in four airliner hijackings, and they departed Jordan later in the day "257 Hijack Hostages Freed". The Palestinian guerrilla group said that it had 39 hostages, although the flight manifests listed 55 passengers and crew who were still not accounted for. The 34 men and five women referred to were Israeli citizens whom the PFLP classified as "prisoners of war".
- The first New York City Marathon was staged. While it would become second only to the Boston Marathon as the most famous U.S. long-distance running race, the first run was described by wire services as a city Department of Recreation event where "Central Park joggers will get their chance for glory". With 126 men and women running, the first 26.219 mi (42.195 km) race consisted of a little more than four laps around New York's Central Park's walking paths and was won by Gary Muhrcke, an FDNY fireman. The race is now routed through the streets of all five boroughs of the city and attracts more than 30,000 runners every year.
- Highlighting the lack of interest in soccer football in the U.S. at the time, a crowd of 5,543 turned out to watch the North American Soccer League (NASL) championship game at the Catholic University stadium in Washington, D.C. The Rochester Lancers "lost the battle but won the war", losing 3 to 1 to the Washington Darts, but winning the championship anyway since the title was determined by the aggregate score of two games. The Lancers had won 3–0 on September 5, so the combined score was Rochester 4, Washington 3.
- In fiction, September 13, 1970, is the birthdate of the protagonist in the Jason Bourne film series, portrayed by actor Matt Damon. The book series by Robert Ludlum was introduced with the 1980 publication of The Bourne Identity.
- Died: Emanuel Goldberg, 89, Russian-born Israeli inventor

== September 14, 1970 (Monday) ==
- The BBC Nine O'Clock News premiered and began a 30-year run on British television. Robert Dougall was the presenter (anchorman) for the first week. The half-hour newscast was introduced three years after the July 3, 1967 premiere of ITV News at Ten.
- The three-member crew of the yacht Galilee was rescued by the USS Niagara Falls after 87 days adrift. Julian Ritter, Lauren Kocx and a third crewmember had departed Tahiti on June 17, preparing to sail for 30 days to Hawaii, until the boat failed. By the time they were saved, they had run out of food and fresh water.
- Born: Mike Burns, American soccer defender with 75 appearances for the U.S. National Team; in Marlborough, Massachusetts
- Died:
  - Rudolf Carnap, 79, German philosopher
  - Virgil T. McCroskey, 93, American conservationist

== September 15, 1970 (Tuesday) ==
- King Hussein of Jordan formed a military government with General Mohammad Daoud Al-Abbasi as his prime minister. Premier Abdel Moneim Fifai and the cabinet resigned after Jordanian truce with PFLP Mohammad Al-Abbasi
- Alitalia Flight 618, a DC-8 jetliner from Rome crashed on landing in New York, injuring 71 of the 138 passengers and six of the 10 crew.
- The Palatine Guard and the Noble Guard, both police units of Vatican City, were disbanded by order of Pope Paul VI. The ceremonial Swiss Guard military unit was retained.
- Almost 344,000 United Auto Workers of America members went on strike against General Motors. UAW members at Ford and Chrysler continued to work pending negotiation of a UAW contract with GM. The UAW ratified the new three-year contract on November 20 after 67 days on strike
- A nationwide railroad strike by the United Transportation Union was blocked by a judge's decision to issue a week-long restraining order. The order went into effect only 30 minutes after the first picket lines were formed at the Chesapeake & Ohio railroad in Huntington, West Virginia.
- In the same week that his co-star on The Andy Griffith Show returned to television, The Don Knotts Show premiered on NBC with Don Knotts hosting a variety show.
- Died: Frank Milano, 79, Italian-born American mobster

== September 16, 1970 (Wednesday) ==
- Investigative journalist Mauro De Mauro was kidnapped as he was returning from work to his home in Palermo. When preparing the film The Mattei Affair, producer Francesco Rosi asked De Mauro to investigate the last days of oil executive Enrico Mattei in Sicily. De Mauro had gotten an audiotape of Mattei's last speech eight days earlier. The journalist's body was never found.

== September 17, 1970 (Thursday) ==
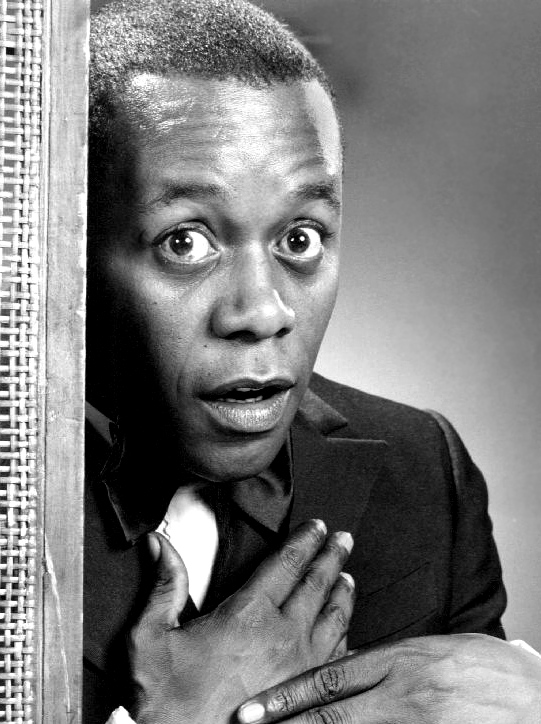
Wilson

- Twenty-seven people were killed in the African nation of Mali, and over 140 injured, when a railroad bridge over the Baoule River collapsed 90 miles (140 km) from Bamako. Nine of the 14 cars on the train from Bamako to Dakar tumbled into the river.
- King Hussein of Jordan ordered the Jordanian Armed Forces to oust Palestinian fedayeen rebel group from Jordan. On September 17, 1970, with U.S. and Israeli help, Jordanian troops attacked PLO guerrilla camps, while Jordan's U.S.-supplied air force dropped napalm from above.
- The Flip Wilson Show premiered on NBC as the first TV variety show to be hosted by an African-American, comedian Clerow "Flip" Wilson.

== September 18, 1970 (Friday) ==
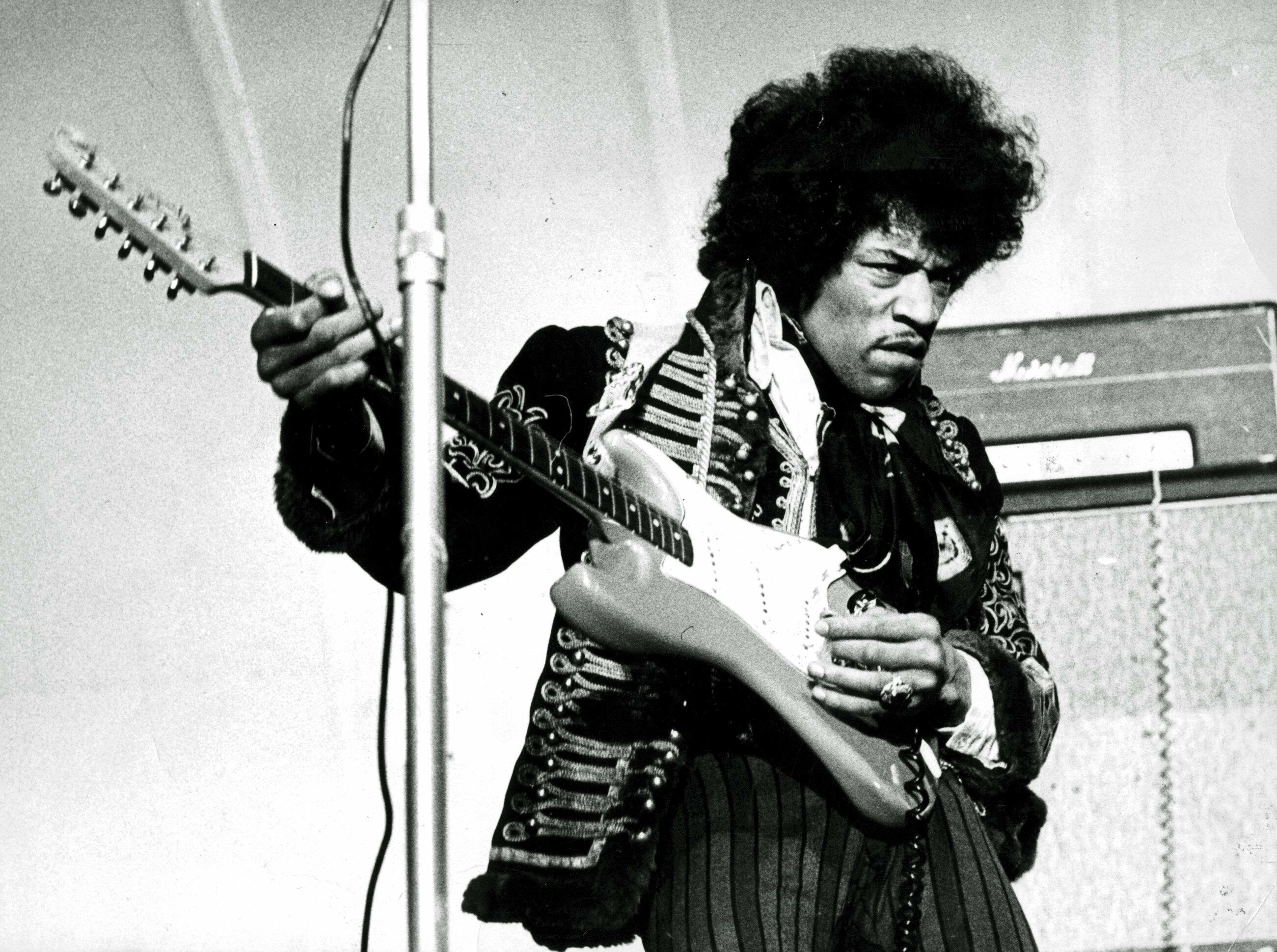
Jimi Hendrix

- American music legend Jimi Hendrix died in London at the age 27 from an overdose of sleeping pills. Hendrix, who had used amphetamines the night before, went to the Samrkand Hotel suite of a friend, Monika Dannemann, and took nine pills from her prescription of the German medicine sleeping pill Vesparax, a medicine whose recommended dosage was half a pill. He was taken to St. Mary Abbot's Hospital in London at 11:45 a.m. and was dead on arrival from aspiration and asphyxiation.
- U.S. President Nixon was notified by National Security Adviser Henry Kissinger that "Analysis of reconnaissance flight photography over Cuba has this morning confirmed the construction of a probable submarine deployment base" by the Soviet Union at Cienfuegos Bay in Cuba.
- Headmaster, a drama comedy on CBS, marked the return of Andy Griffith to a TV series. The show finished third in its time slot, and was replaced by a different show made for Griffith.
- Born:
  - Emmanuel Besnier, French businessman nicknamed "the invisible billionaire"; in Laval
  - Darren Gough, English cricketer and fast bowler in Test Cricket matches for the England national team; in Monk Bretton, South Yorkshire

== September 19, 1970 (Saturday) ==
- The first Glastonbury Festival took place in England, at a farm belonging to Michael Eavis.

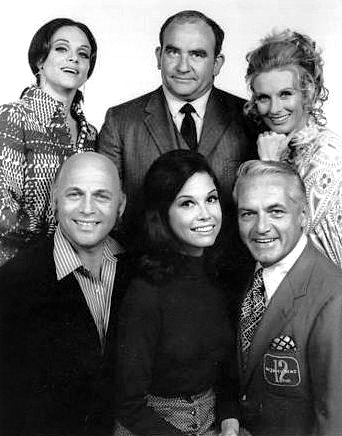
Mary Richards and friends

- The Mary Tyler Moore Show began a seven-season run as a situation comedy about a woman starting a new career as an associate TV news producer. Reactions to Ms. Moore's return to television (after having been a co-star on The Dick Van Dyke Show) were generally favorable, with one critic noting that she "is back where she belongs, as a girl with spunk in a TV series", while another commented, "The dialogue, for the most part, was bright, and Miss Moore was most attractive, but the characters surrounding her in the show left me rather cold."
- The Cal State Fullerton Titans football football team traces its roots to 1969, when, in May, former USC assistant coach Dick Coury was hired as the program's first head coach. The team would win their inaugural game against Cal Poly Pomona by a score of 31–0 on September 19, 1970.
- Died: Kostas Georgakis, 22, Greek student of geology, set himself ablaze in Genoa's Matteotti Square in Italy, as a protest against the dictatorial regime of Georgios Papadopoulos.

== September 20, 1970 (Sunday) ==
- The uncrewed Soviet probe Luna 16 landed on the Moon at the Mare Fecunditatis and was able to gather the USSR's own samples of the lunar surface. Luna 16 lifted off the next day and returned to Earth on September 24, making the Soviet Union the only other nation (after the U.S.) to bring part of the Moon's surface
- Syria invaded Jordan as two armor divisions poured across the border at Ramtha and then pushed toward Irbid
- In elections for Sweden's parliament, the Riksdag, Prime Minister Olof Palme's Social Demokratiska Arbetareparti (SAP), the Social Democrats, lost their majority in Parliament, despite picking up 38 additional seats. Because of an unprecedented absentee vote (of almost 700,000 votes that had been mailed before the election), final results were not known for a week The Riksdag, formerly the 232-seat Andra kammaren, the lower house of a bicameral Parliament, had been consolidated with the 151-seat upper house and made into a 350-seat unicameral parliament. Having 163 seats in the new Riksdag, but needing 176 for a majority, the SAP had to forge a coalition with the 17 members elected from the Swedish Communist Party in order to form a government. Gunnar Hedlund's Centerpartiet was second, with 71 seats.
- France's Prime Minister Jacques Chaban-Delmas, facing a challenge for his required seat in the National Assembly from Jean-Jacques Servan-Schreiber and six other candidates, won 63.6% of the vote in his district. The surprising result ended the possibility of the Prime Minister having to compete in a runoff election.
- The second game of the two-game 1969–70 National Hurling League championship final was played in New York City's Gaelic Park, as the Cork GAA Rebels of Ireland defeated the New York GAA Exiles, on the aggregate score. Cork won, 4–11 to 4–8 in the first match (equivalent to 23 to 20), and although New York needed to win the second match by at least 4 points, its 2–8 to 1–10 victory (14-13) fell short. The combined score was Cork 5-21, New York 6-16 (a 36 to 34 point win for Cork)
- In single party elections for the Albanian Parliament, the slate of 264 candidates for the lone political party, the Communist Fronti Demokratik, reportedly received 1,097,122 of the 1,097,123 votes cast. The exception was a lone "blank vote" by a citizen who cast a ballot without marking a choice
- CBS's NFL Today hired Marjorie Margolies as the first woman commentator on a nationally televised sports show.
- Born:
  - Dmitri Poliaroush, Belarusan world champion trampolinist; in Berzniki, RSFSR, Soviet Union
  - Gert Verheyen, Belgian soccer football forward with 50 appearances on the Belgian national team; in Hoogstraten

== September 21, 1970 (Monday) ==
- Monday Night Football made its debut on ABC, bringing a primetime NFL game to American audiences on a regular basis for the first time. In the opening show, the Cleveland Browns defeated the New York Jets, 31–21, in front of more than 85,000 fans at Cleveland Stadium.
- On the second day of its attempt to become the first balloon to make a crossing of the Atlantic Ocean, the helium-filled craft, The Free Life, reported that it was losing altitude in a storm. The balloon had lifted off the day before at 1:40 p.m. from East Hampton, New York with English pilot Malcolm Brighton, and two Americans, commodities broker Rod Anderson and his wife, actress Pamela Brown Anderson. At 7:05 Monday evening, they made their last communication, sending a distress call and reporting that they were descending to the sea, having traveled 800 miles (1,300 km) before encountering the heavy weather 450 miles (720 km) east of Newfoundland. A nine-day search by the U.S. Coast Guard was abandoned without finding the gondola of the balloon, which had carried with it a large life raft, emergency equipment, a radio transmitter, signal flares and 10 days of food "
- Born:
  - Samantha Power, English-Irish born U.S. Ambassador to the United Nations from 2013 to 2017; in London
  - John Cudia, American stage actor, in Toms River, New Jersey
- Died:
  - Dorita Fairlie Bruce, 85, British author of books for girls, creator of the Dimsie series.
  - Gong Peng, 55, China's first woman to direct a division, as head of the Bureau of Information

== September 22, 1970 (Tuesday) ==
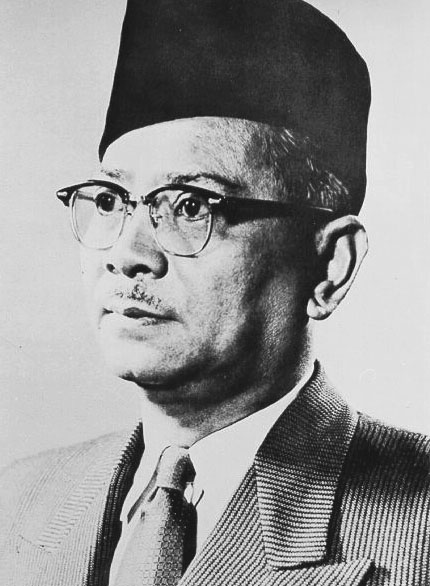
Tunku Abdul Rahman and Tun Abdul Razak
- Longtime Prime Minister of Malaysia Tunku Abdul Rahman stepped down after 15 years as the leader of the Malayan and the Malaysian government, having announced his resignation on August 30. Abdul Halim of Kedah, who had taken office as the new Yang di-Pertuan Agong (the elected Malaysian monarch) the day before, formally asked Rahman's deputy, Tun Abdul Razak, to form the new government. Rahman's powers had been curtailed after his response to 1969 rioting in Kuala Lumpur, when 143 ethnic Chinese and 25 Malays had been killed.
- The District of Columbia Delegate Act was signed into law, giving the District of Columbia representation in the U.S. Congress for the first time in its history. The act also provided for voters in Washington to directly elect a government, something that had been taken away in 1874, and for a non-voting delegate to the U.S. House of Representatives
- Born:
  - Gladys Berejiklian, Australian politician, Premier of New South Wales 2017 to 2021; in Manly, New South Wales
  - Mike Matheny, American major league baseball catcher and manager; in Columbus, Ohio
  - Mystikal (stage name for Michael Lawrence Tyler) American rapper and hip-hop artist; in New Orleans
- Died:
  - Dr. Alice Hamilton, 101, American physician who became (in 1919) the first woman to be appointed to the faculty of Harvard University
  - Dr. Howard Snyder, 89, U.S. Army major general who was Physician to the President for Dwight D. Eisenhower

== September 23, 1970 (Wednesday) ==
- Using an arsenal of weapons stolen from the Massachusetts National Guard armory in Newburyport, Massachusetts, a criminal gang of two women and three men robbed $26,000 from a bank in Brighton and killed the first police officer on the scene. Katherine Ann Power and Susan Edith Saxe, graduates of Brandeis University, joined with Stanley Ray Bond and two ex-convicts Bond had met in prison. The three men would be captured shortly after the robbery, but Saxe was caught in 1975 and Power remained free until 1993.
- The Houston Women's Invitation Tournament, the first professional tennis tournament for women only, stated in Texas as the inaugural event of the Virginia Slims Circuit tour. The Philip Morris cigarette company sponsored the tour in conjunction with the promotion of its "Virginia Slims" brand of cigarettes marketed for sale to women. Billie Jean King and eight other top-ranked women's amateur players (Rosie Casals, Julie Heldman, Valerie Ziegenfuss, Judy Dalton, Kristy Pigeon, Peaches Bartkowicz, Kerry Melville Reid and Nancy Richey) turned professional on the day of the tournament, with each accepting the token amount of one dollar to play in the first women's only tournament, not sanctioned by the United States Lawn Tennis Association (USLTA). To avoid punishment by the U.S. and International tennis associations, however, the sponsors dropped the $5,000 prize money and announced that they would pay the players in the form of expenses. King commented, "We weren't happy this way. We thought we'd like to play above board rather than get expenses under the table. We're all pros so why should we become amateurs for a week? We're trying to make this game honest."
- Jimmy Carter, a wealthy peanut farmer and former state senator in the U.S. state of Georgia, won the state Democratic Party primary, in a state where Democrats had won the past 38 gubernatorial elections since 1871. Carter would easily win the general election in November, and would be elected the 39th President of the United States only six years later.
- Born: Ani DiFranco; American folk singer and activist; in Buffalo, New York
- Died: André Bourvil (stage name for Andre Raimbourg), 53, French film comedian, died of Kahler's syndrome, a cancer of the bone marrow.

== September 24, 1970 (Thursday) ==
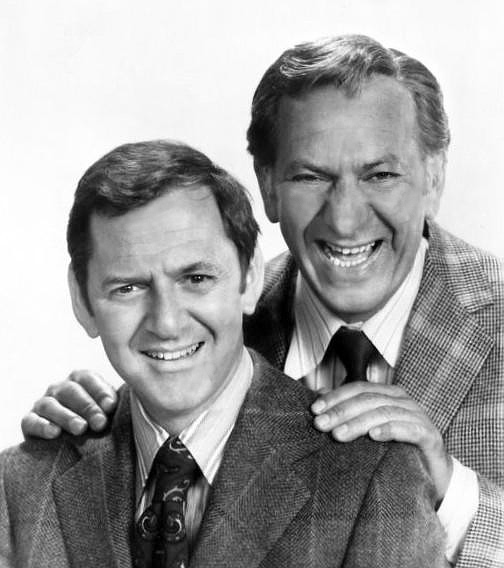
Tony Randall and Jack Klugman

- Luna 16 returned to Earth with about 100 grams (3.6 ounces) of lunar soil from the Mare Fecunditatis.
- The Odd Couple TV series, based on the Neil Simon stage play and film, premiered, with Tony Randall and Jack Klugman playing the roles of Felix Unger and Oscar Madison Reviews ranged from "Somewhat disappointing" by UPI critic Rick Du Brow to "the season's funniest new situation comedy". Less successful was a sitcom based on another Simon play, Barefoot in the Park, the first modern era TV show with a predominantly black cast; however, the star, Scoey Mitchell, was fired by producers before the premiere, after 12 episodes had been filmed. Matt Lincoln, a medical drama starring Vince Edwards (who had previously had the title role in the medical drama Ben Casey appeared after both shows.
- Jordan's new prime minister, General Mohammad Daoud Al-Abbasi, resigned along with the rest of his cabinet after only nine days in office.
- Died: Ernie Pitts, 35, American college football and Canadian Football League star, was shot and killed by his wife during a domestic dispute while visiting his home in Denver. Pitts had flown to Colorado earlier in the day from Vancouver, the morning after a 24–14 loss by his British Columbia Lions team to the Hamilton Tigercats.

== September 25, 1970 (Friday) ==
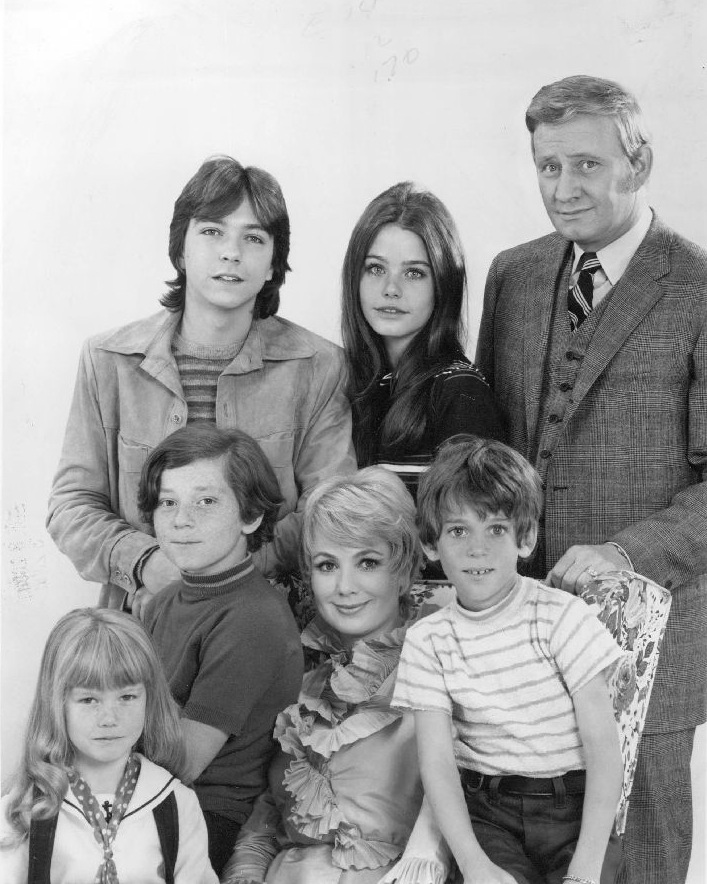
Partridge Family cast

- The Partridge Family, a situation comedy about a fictitious family of pop musicians, premiered on ABC television. Only two members of the cast, Shirley Jones and her stepson, David Cassidy, could actually sing or play a musical instrument, and a team of studio musicians and singers recorded the popular record albums and singles which the actors would lip sync to during the filming. Critics were generally negative, with one commenting that "It's a genuine plastic imitation of the Cowsills family act and comes equipped with Shirley Jones, five children and an easily amused laughing machine" and another, referring to the opening credit sequence, wrote "'The Partridge Family' lays eggs"; but another critic opined that while "the prognosticators don't give it much of a chance", the show "is in my book a thorough-going delight." Within a month, the first Partridge Family song, "I Think I Love You", was ranked in the Top 20 of bestselling U.S. singles by Billboard magazine
- One week after American aerial reconnaissance flights had demonstrated cause for suspicion, the U.S. Defense Department announced that a Soviet submarine base was being built in Cuba at the Cienfuegos harbor. A spokesman raised the possibility that the military facility would be used to support the Soviet Union's new Yankee-class submarines, which were capable of carrying 16 nuclear missiles The crisis was quietly resolved by diplomatic discussions between American and Soviet officials, and (according to an investigative report by the Chicago Tribune), U.S. aerial reconnaissance confirmed by October 10 that dismantling of the base had begun without any submarine ever using it
- Serial killer Dean Corll kidnapped and murdered his first known victim, 18-year-old college freshman, Jeffrey Konen, after Konen had been dropped off in Houston for a weekend visit home. Konen was about five miles from his girlfriend's house when Corll offered to give him a ride The fate of Konen and 26 other young men would be discovered almost three years later, found buried outside of Corll's home in Pasadena, Texas after Corll's killing on August 8, 1973
- Born: Aja Kong (ring name for Erika Shishido) Japanese female professional wrestler; in Tokyo
- Died:
  - Erich Maria Remarque, 72, German novelist known for All Quiet on the Western Front
  - Inez Haynes Irwin, 97, American feminist novelist

== September 26, 1970 (Saturday) ==
- The Laguna Fire started at the Laguna Summit in San Diego County, California when 50 mph (80 km/h) winds caused a tree to topple onto an electric power line, and the sparking line then fell on to dry brush near the intersection of the Sunrise Highway and Interstate 8 Over a course of eight days until its containment on October 3, it would burn more than 274 square miles (710 km^{2}), destroy 382 homes and kill eight people.
- In a turning point in the evolution of Australian rules football, the Carlton Blues edged the Collingwood Magpies, 111 to 101, to win the championship of the Victorian Football League, the highest level of the sport, and predecessor to the Australian Football League. Trailing 73 to 29 (10.13 to 4.5) at halftime, Carlton scored 13 six-point goals and held Collingwood to just four in the last two quarters. A record crowd of 121,696 spectators turned out to the Melbourne Cricket Ground for the event.
- Icelandair Flight 704, a Fokker F27 airplane crashed into a mountain on the island of Mykines, Faroe Islands, killing eight of 34 people on board. The plane had departed from Bergen in Norway after originating in Copenhagen, and was approaching the island of Vágar, site of the Faroes' only airport, when it encountered a downdraft.
- Born: Marco Etcheverry, Bolivian footballer with 71 appearances for the Bolivia national team; in Santa Cruz de la Sierra,
- Died: Jessie Ball duPont, 86, American philanthropist

== September 27, 1970 (Sunday) ==
- U.S. President Richard Nixon began a tour of Europe, visiting Italy, Yugoslavia, Spain, the United Kingdom and the Republic of Ireland.
- Pope Paul VI named Saint Teresa of Ávila as the first female Doctor of the Church.
- The longest-running program on American television up to that time, Ted Mack's talent show The Original Amateur Hour, was telecast for the final time. CBS had presented the show at 5:30 eastern time on Sunday afternoons, but as the network's National Football League telecasts became more popular, Ted Mack was regularly preempted in 1969 when CBS began showing two games every Sunday. On November 2, CBS announced that it would no longer be telecasting Ted Mack's program.
- Kerry won its second straight Gaelic football championship in the Gaelic Athletic Association, defeating Meath, 2 goals and 19 overs (25 overall) to 0 goals and 18 overs, (2-19 to 0-18 = 25–18).
- Born: Yoshiharu Habu, Japanese master of the games of shogi and chess; in Tokorozawa, Saitama Prefecture

== September 28, 1970 (Monday) ==
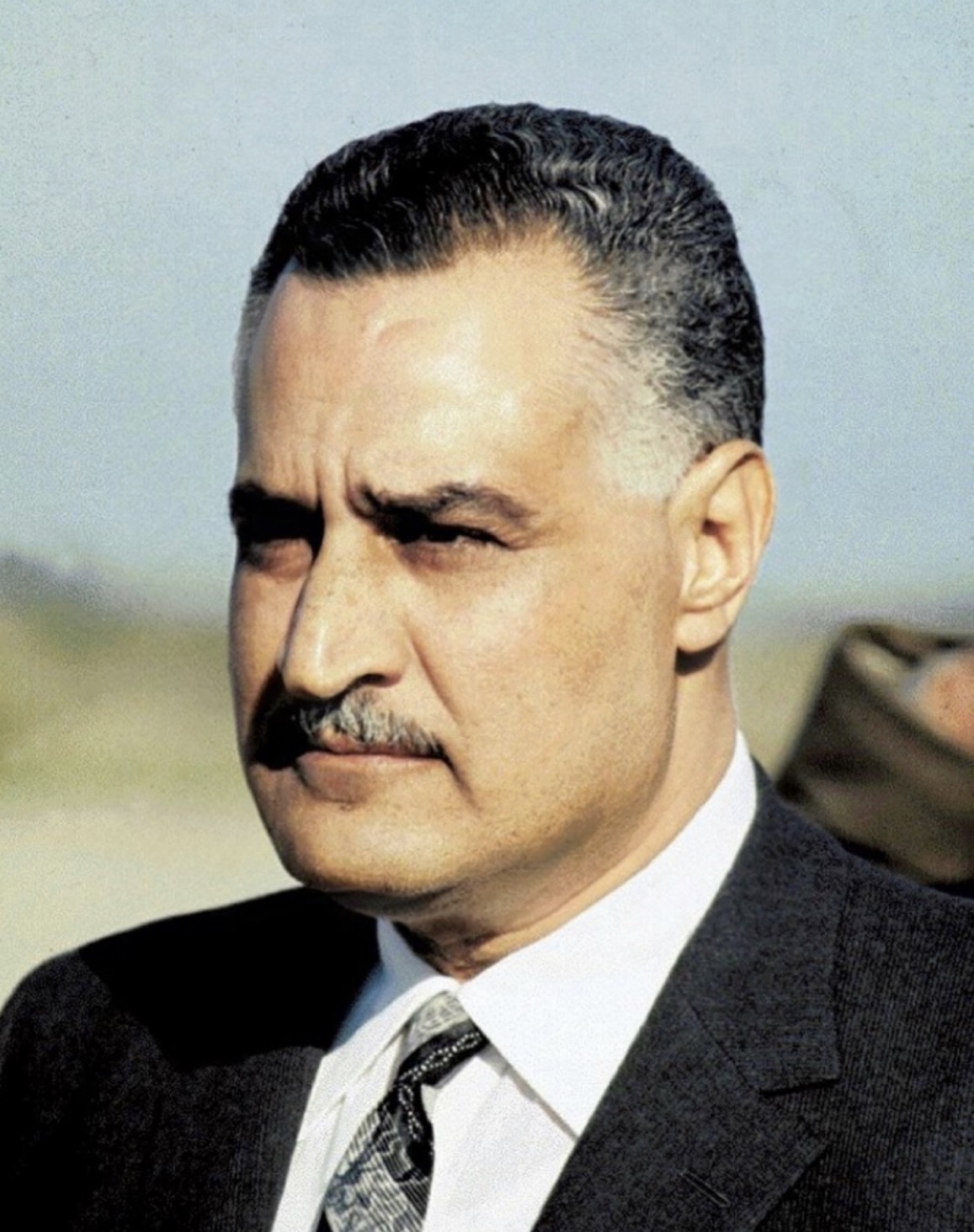
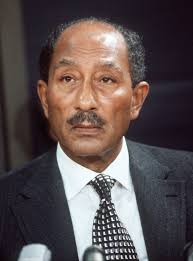
Gamal Abdel Nasser and Anwar Sadat
- Gamal Abdel Nasser, the long-time President of the United Arab Republic (UAR), died of a heart attack at the age of 52. Nasser, who had just concluded the 1970 Arab League summit in Cairo, had bid farewell to Kuwait's Emir Sabah Al-Salim Al-Sabah at the Cairo airport when he began to take ill at 3:30 pm local time, and was met by physicians at his home in the suburb of Manshiet el Bakry, where he suffered a myocardial infarction from a coronary thrombosis. Efforts to save Nasser were unsuccessful, and he was pronounced dead at 6:15 (1615 UTC). He was succeeded by his vice president, Anwar Sadat, who would later restore the UAR to the name of the Republic of Egypt.
- A large flock of birds was killed after crashing into the north side of the Empire State Building in New York City, about three hours after the building's display lights were turned off. An estimated 150 migrating starlings struck the 102-story skyscraper and plunged to their deaths, littering Fifth Avenue and 34th Street
- The United States won the America's Cup yachting race for the 73rd consecutive time, as the New York Yacht Club's defending champion, Intrepid was piloted by Bill Ficker, finished ahead of Australia's Gretel II to win the best-of-seven series, four races to one.
- In Springfield, Illinois, the new Sangamon State University (SSU) held its first classes, with 45 faculty members available to teach 811 students. Because the permanent campus was not complete, the first classes were held at the First United Methodist Church in downtown Springfield. The institution is now called the University of Illinois at Springfield and has over 5,400 students and 832 faculty.
- Born: Kimiko Date, Japanese professional tennis player and 8-time Women's Tennis Association title winner; in Kyoto
- Died: John Dos Passos, 74, American novelist and historian

== September 29, 1970 (Tuesday) ==
- The Red Army Faction robbed three banks in West Berlin simultaneously, amassing over DM200,000 to sustain their rebellion against the West German government.
- In Jordan, the PFLP released the last six hostages that it had taken in the September 6 hijacking of four planes, turning them over to the International Red Cross headquarters in Amman. All six were Americans who had been on TWA Flight 741
- Born:
  - Emily Lloyd, English film and TV actress, National Society of Film Critics Award and British Film Award winner; in London
  - Russell Peters, Canadian stand-up comedian; in Toronto
- Died: Edward Everett Horton, 84, American character actor

== September 30, 1970 (Wednesday) ==
- The "shootout" was used to decide an international soccer football tournament game for the first time since FIFA had approved the rule on June 27. In the first round of the European Cup Winners' Cup, the aggregate score of a home-and-away series decided who would advance in the playoffs. Aberdeen F.C. of Scotland had beaten Budapest Honvéd FC of Hungary at home, 3–1. At the end of regulation in Budapest, Honved beat Aberdeen, 3–1, making the aggregate score 4-4. No goals were scored in extra time, so the shootout was played as five players from each side alternated in kicking from the penalty line. The first four kicks by both teams were good, but Aberdeen's Jim Forrest "had the cruel luck to beat Bicksei, the Honved goalkeeper, with his shot, only to see the ball strike the underside of the bar and bounce to safety"; Bertalan Bicskei then took the final shot for his team and "proved just as adept at scoring goals as at saving them. A shootout had been used to decide a semifinal game in the preseason Watney Cup, played on August 5 before the start of the regular season of England's Football League; in that game, Manchester United outshot Hull, 4–3, to break a 1–1 draw
- The U.S. Food and Drug Administration announced that it would require impact-resistant lenses for all prescription eyeglasses and all sunglasses sold in the United States. FDA Commissioner Charles C. Edwards noted that 120,000 injuries from broken glasses lenses were reported in 1969, and the National Society for the Prevention of Blindness had cited statistics that 34,000 people suffered serious eye injuries from broken glass during the 1960s. At the time, only two U.S. states required shatterproof glasses
- Born: Tony Hale, American comedian, TV actor and twice Emmy Award winner; in West Point, New York
- Died: Benedetto Aloisi Masella, 91, Italian Roman Catholic Cardinal and Vatican official
