= October 1970 =

Month of 1970

<<	October 1970					>>
Su	Mo	Tu	We	Th	Fr	Sa
				1	2	3
4	5	6	7	8	9	10
11	12	13	14	15	16	17
18	19	20	21	22	23	24
25	26	27	28	29	30	31

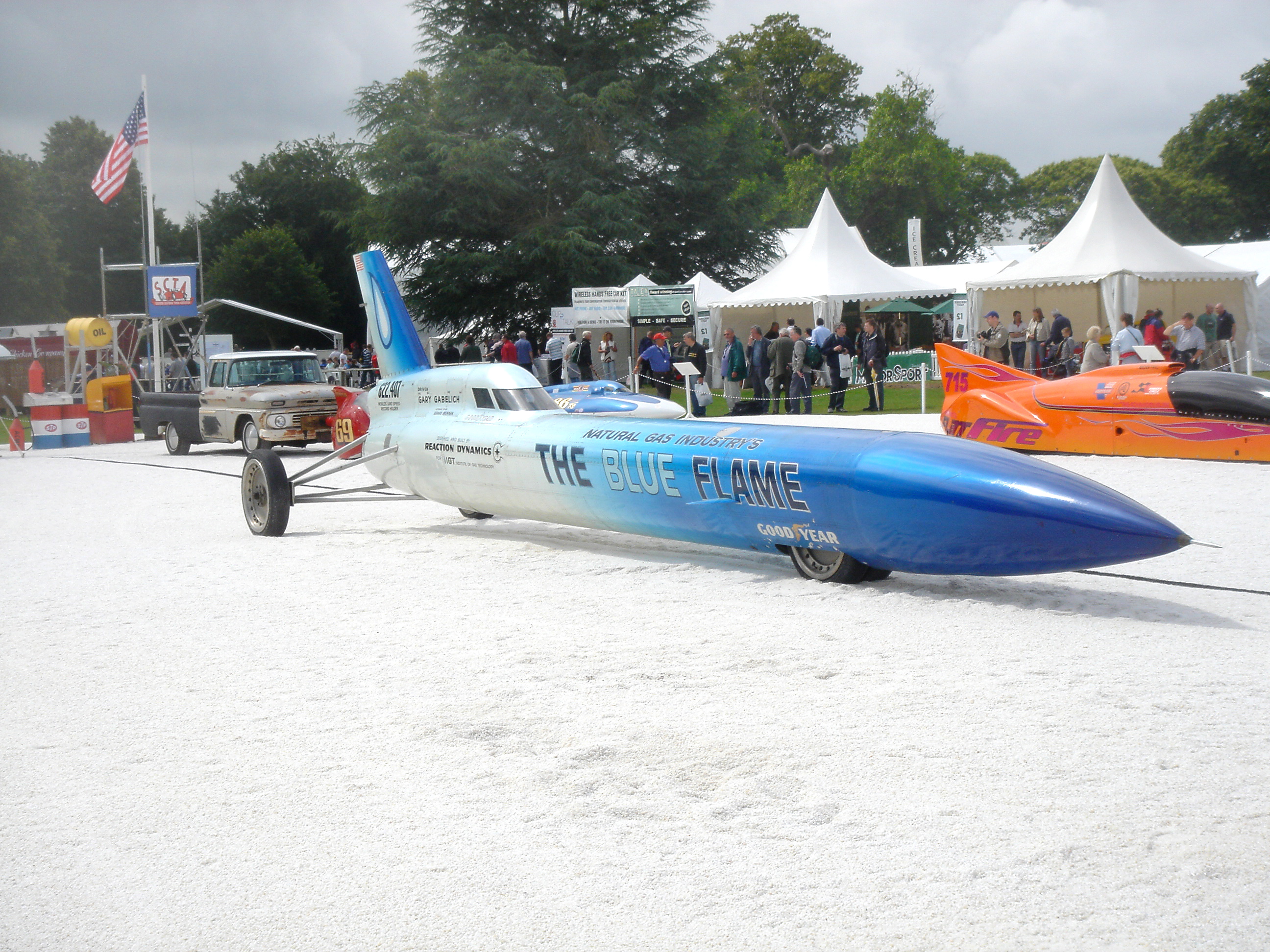
October 23, 1970: Gary Gabelich becomes first man to drive a car 1,000 kilometers per hour, reaches 622.407 mph

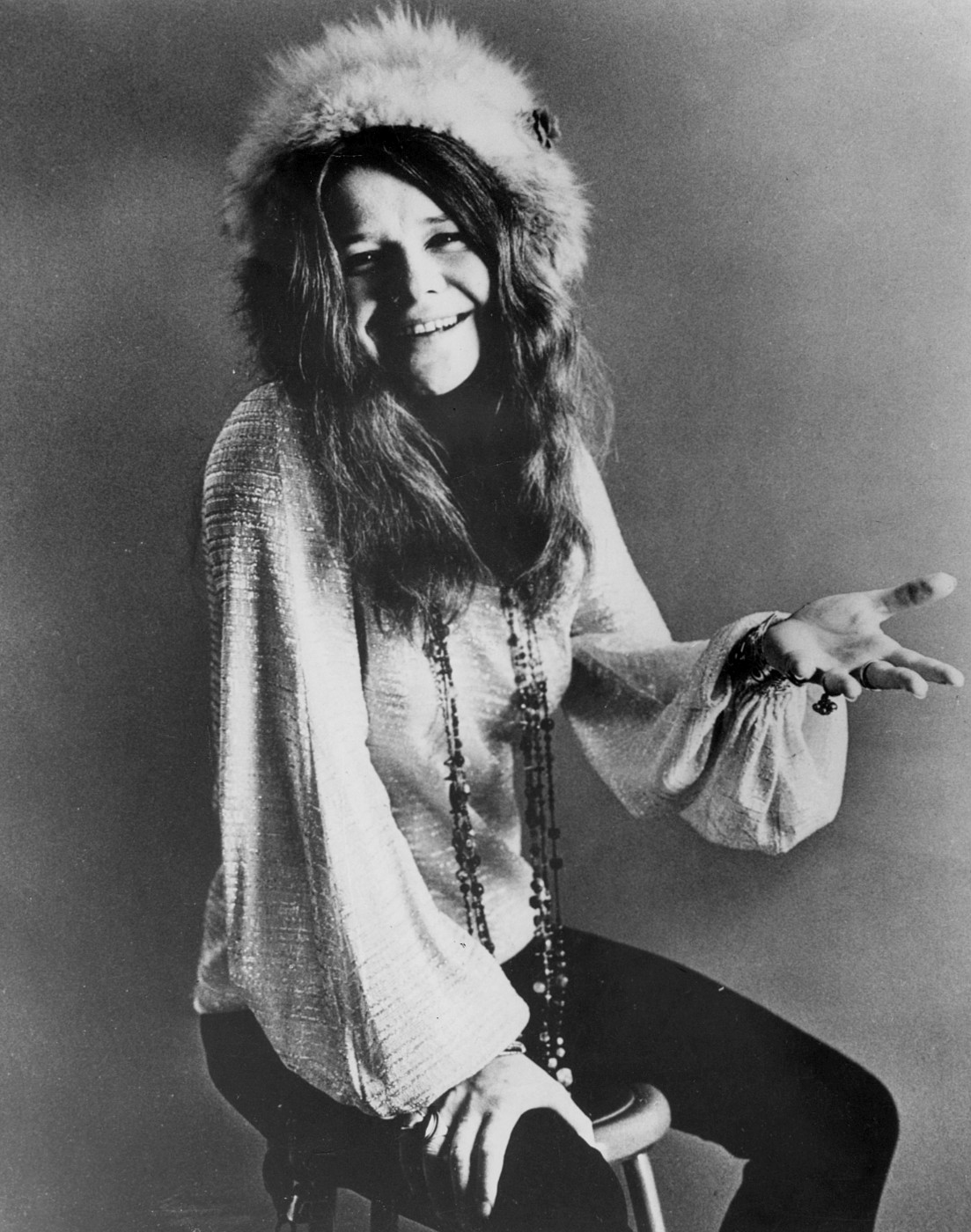
October 4, 1970: Singer Janis Joplin dies of overdose at aged 27

October 10, 1970: Dominion of Fiji becomes independent

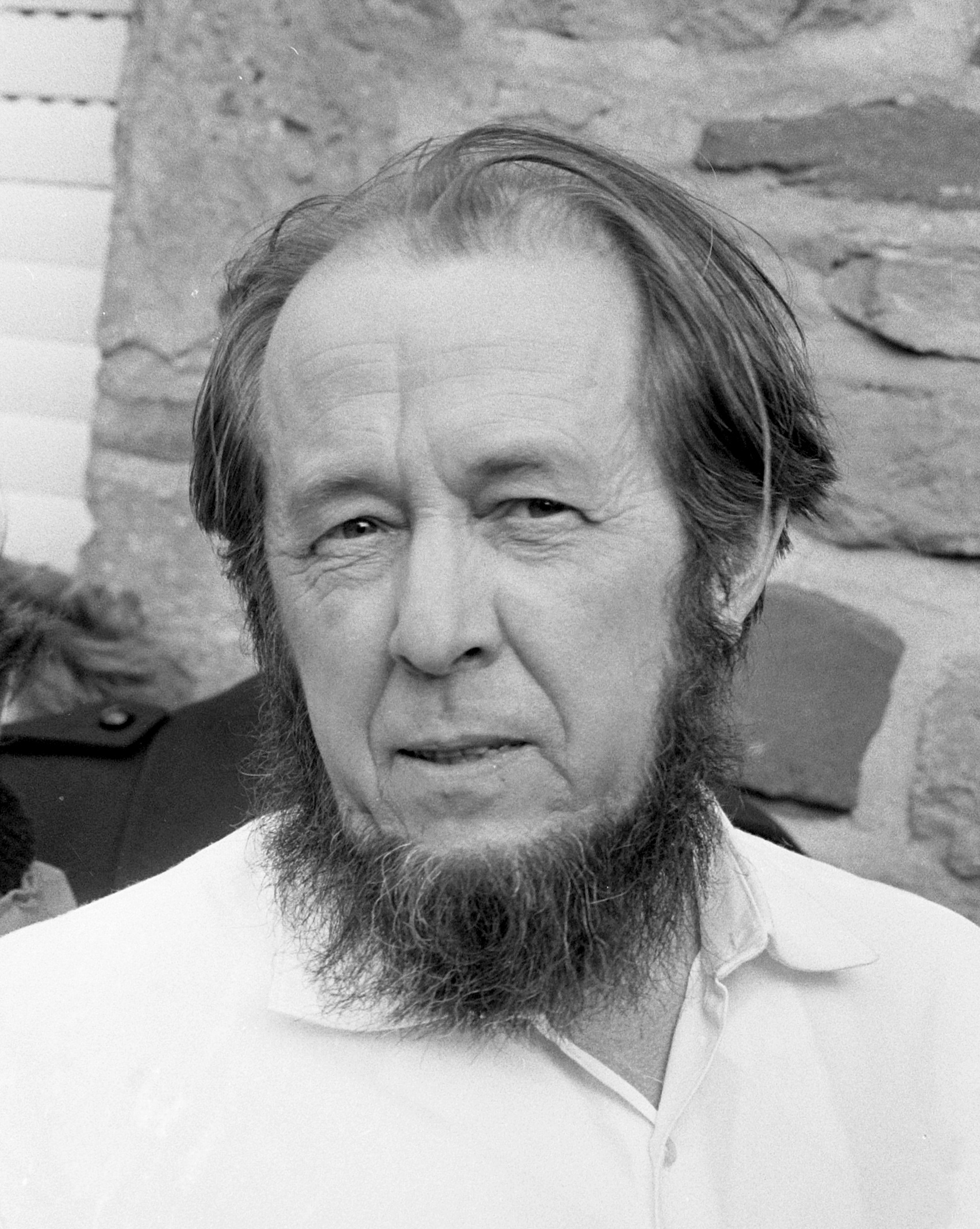
October 8, 1970: Soviet author Aleksandr Solzhenitsyn wins Nobel Prize, not allowed to accept it

October 9, 1970: Kingdom of Cambodia proclaimed as "The Khmer Republic"

The following events occurred in October 1970:

== October 1, 1970 (Thursday) ==
- An estimated five million mourners, more than one-eighth of the population of Egypt, flooded the streets of Cairo in order to witness the 15 mi (24 km) long funeral procession for President Gamal Abdel Nasser, who had died suddenly on Monday from a heart attack.
- Born: Moses Kiptanui, Kenyan long-distance runner, world champion in 3000m steeplechase 1991, 1993 and 1995; in Marakwet District
- Died: Petar Konjović, 87, Serbian Yugoslavian classical music composer

== October 2, 1970 (Friday) ==
- The crash of a chartered airplane in the Rocky Mountains killed 32 of the 40 people on board, including 14 members of the Wichita State University football team and head coach Ben Wilson. The group had been traveling to play against Utah State University in a game scheduled for the following afternoon. Two Martin 4-0-4 airplanes, designated as N464M and N470M had been chartered from Golden Eagle Aviation from Wichita, Kansas to Logan, Utah, with an intermediate stop at Denver. While the N470M plane (with 23 other players) safely flew from Denver to Logan according to the flight plan filed with the FAA, the crew of N464M informed its passengers that they would be flown along a "scenic route" through the Rocky Mountains. Flying at an altitude of 10,800 feet (3,300 m), N464M was unable to clear the 12,447 ft (3,794 m) high Mount Trelease near Silver Plume, Colorado. Two of the three crew and 30 of the 37 passengers were killed. The final investigation report by the National Transportation Safety Board concluded that the cause of the crash was "The intentional operation of the aircraft over a mountain valley route at an altitude from which the aircraft could neither climb over the obstructing terrain ahead, nor execute a successful course reversal." Despite the loss of their starters, the remaining Wichita State players would vote, 17–16, to play the last six scheduled games of the season with assistant Bob Seaman as the new coach
- All 38 passengers and five crew aboard a United States Air Force Lockheed C-130 transport were killed when the plane crashed into the side of the 6,200 ft (1,900 m) high Chin Tien mountain shortly after departing Taipei en route to Ching Chuan Kang AFB in Taichung.
- Pink Floyd released Atom Heart Mother, which would become their first number one album.
- Born: Kelly Ripa, American talk show host of Live! with Regis and Kelly, later Live with Kelly and Ryan; in Berlin, New Jersey]
- Died: Lauro Gazzolo, 69, Italian comedian and character actor on film, known also for dubbing voices for American films released in Italy

== October 3, 1970 (Saturday) ==
- In Lebanon, the government of Prime Minister Rashid Karami resigned following the August 17 election of Suleiman Franjieh as the nation's new president. Reportedly, the expected change in government had been delayed by the Jordanian civil war and then by the death of Egypt's President Nasser.
- The National Oceanic and Atmospheric Administration (NOAA) began operations as the successor to the Environmental Science Services Administration (ESSA), as the National Environmental Policy Act (NEPA) went into effect
- The United States Weather Bureau was renamed as the National Weather Service, and made a division of NOAA.
- Pope Paul VI named Saint Catherine of Siena as the second female Doctor of the Church.

== October 4, 1970 (Sunday) ==
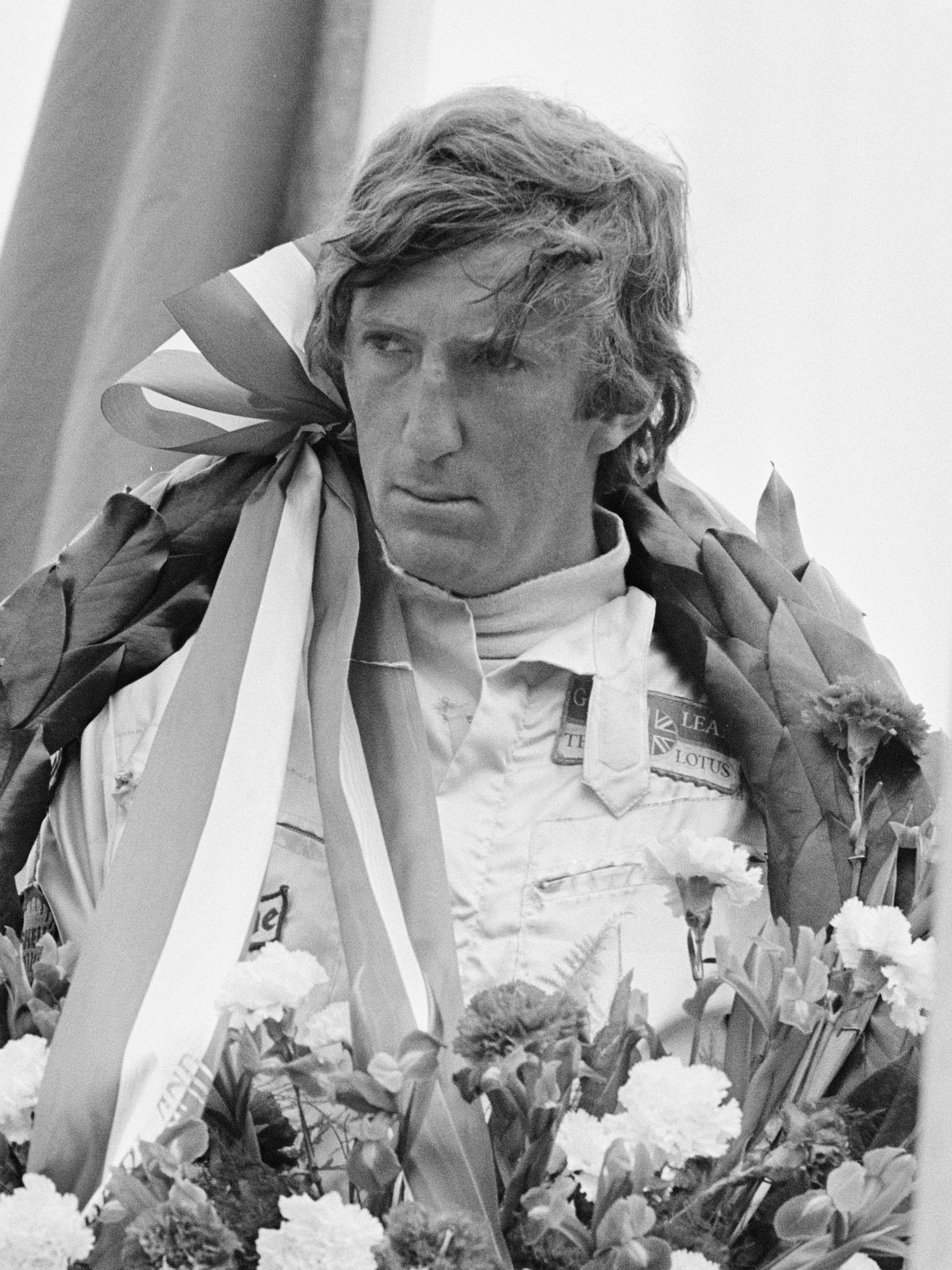
1970 World Driving Champion Rindt, deceased

- American singer Janis Joplin died at age 27, from an overdose of drugs. Her body was found in room 105 at the Landmark Motel in Hollywood, California. Her manager, John Cooke, had become alarmed after he hadn't seen her during the day.
- Almost a month after his September 5 death in a racing accident in Italy, Jochen Rindt won the title of Formula One World Driving Champion, based on five first-place finishes in races before his accident. Rindt was the first (and so far, only) champion to earn the honor posthumously. Going into the U.S. Grand Prix at Watkins Glen, New York, Jacky Ickx (with 28 points), was the only racer left who could still beat Rindt's 45 points (based on 9 points for each of his five wins), but it would require Ickx to finish in first place in both the U.S. race and the Mexican Grand Prix. Halfway through the U.S. race, Ickx was forced to make a pit stop to replace "a 99-cent fuel line" that had split, costing him enough time that he finished in fourth place, good for only 3 points
- In Bolivia, General Rogelio Miranda and a group of fellow Bolivian Army officers began a revolt, demanding the resignation of President Alfredo Ovando Candía. President Ovando then fired Miranda and the rebel officers.
- National Educational Television (NET) ended operations, and was succeeded by the Public Broadcasting Service (PBS).
- Born: Zdravko Zdravkov, Bulgarian soccer football goalkeeper for Bulgarian national team from 1996 to 2005; in Sofia
- Died: Curtis Turner, 46, American NASCAR driver, was killed along with professional golfer Clarence "Rube" King when their twin-engine aircraft crashed in western Pennsylvania

== October 5, 1970 (Monday) ==
- The Front de libération du Québec (FLQ) kidnapped British diplomat James "Jasper" Cross in Montreal and demanded the release of 23 imprisoned FLQ members, beginning Quebec's October Crisis. The Canadian government rejected the demand the next day. The Canadian government would successfully negotiate Cross's release on December 3, in return for allowing the FLQ members to be flown to Cuba without being prosecuted criminally.
- The Public Broadcasting Service (PBS) began broadcasting as a successor to National Educational Television (NET), on NET stations in the United States. Promising new original programming to supplement existing NET favorites like Sesame Street and The French Chef, PBS introduced U.S. television viewers to the BBC's 13-part documentary series Civilisation. A press release noted that PBS "no longer burdened by the name National Educational Television, opens its new season this Monday with fond hopes of living up to its billing as the 'fourth network.' By whatever name it is known, non-commercial television seeks to offer the viewer a difference this fall. And nothing exemplifies the difference quite like 'Civilisation,' as the English spell it..."
- Born:
  - Elie Mechantaf, Lebanese professional basketball player, in Beirut
  - Hiromitsu Kanehara, Japanese mixed martial artist; in Owariasahi, Aichi

== October 6, 1970 (Tuesday) ==
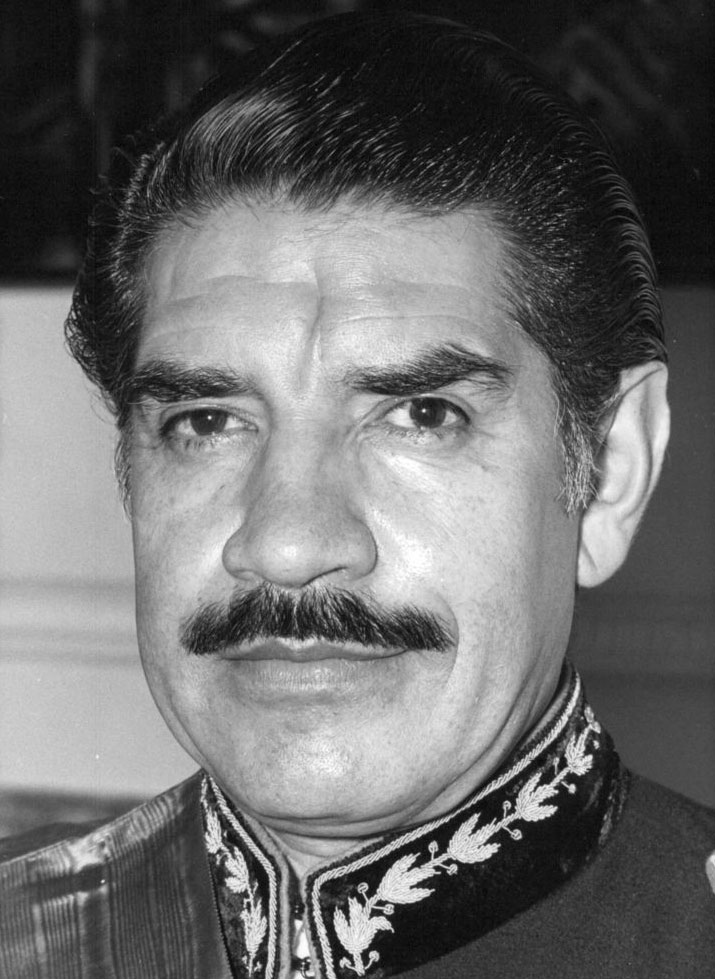
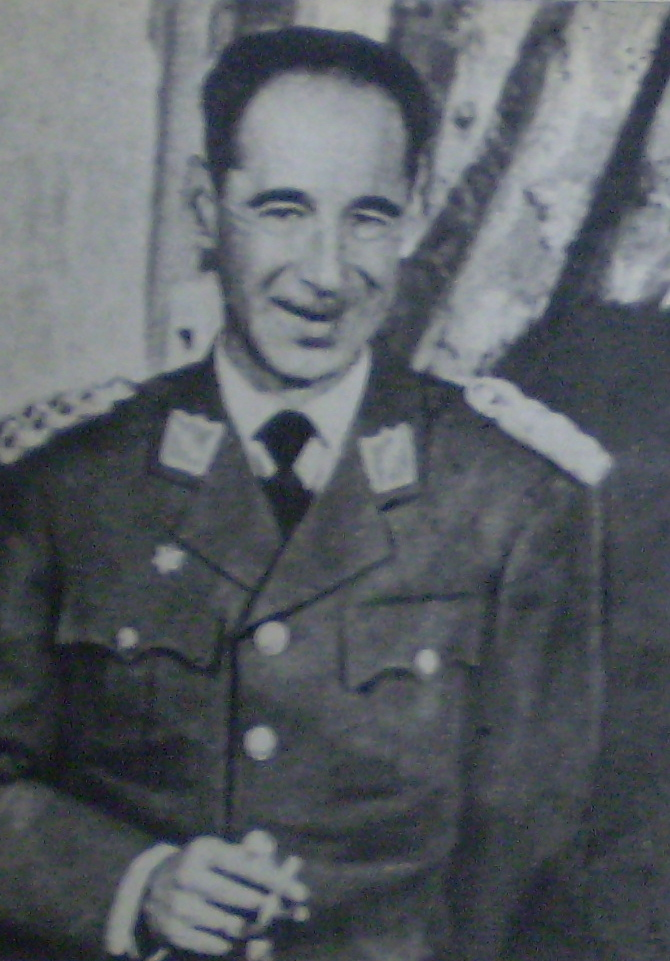
Coup leader Miranda, deposed President Ovando
- Bolivian President Alfredo Ovando Candía resigned two days after the revolt of Bolivian Army troops. Ovando's departure began a brief civil war between rebel forces, who claimed control of Bolivia's second-largest city, Cochabamba, and those loyal to the government. General Rogelio Miranda, who started the uprising, appointed a three-man junta to govern the South American nation, while the government named Juan José Torres as the new president.
- A year and a day after the Weather Underground had used a bomb to severely damage the Chicago monument to the Haymarket bombing, the anarchist group bombed the repaired statue again.
- Born:
  - Amy Jo Johnson, American Canadian actress; in Hyannis, Massachusetts
  - Nargiz Zakirova, Uzbek-American singer and three-time Golden Gramophone Award winner; in Tashkent

== October 7, 1970 (Wednesday) ==
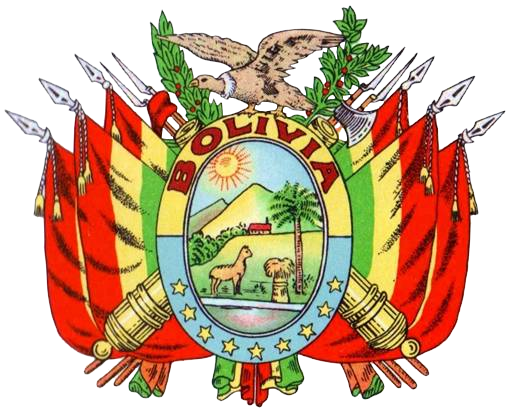
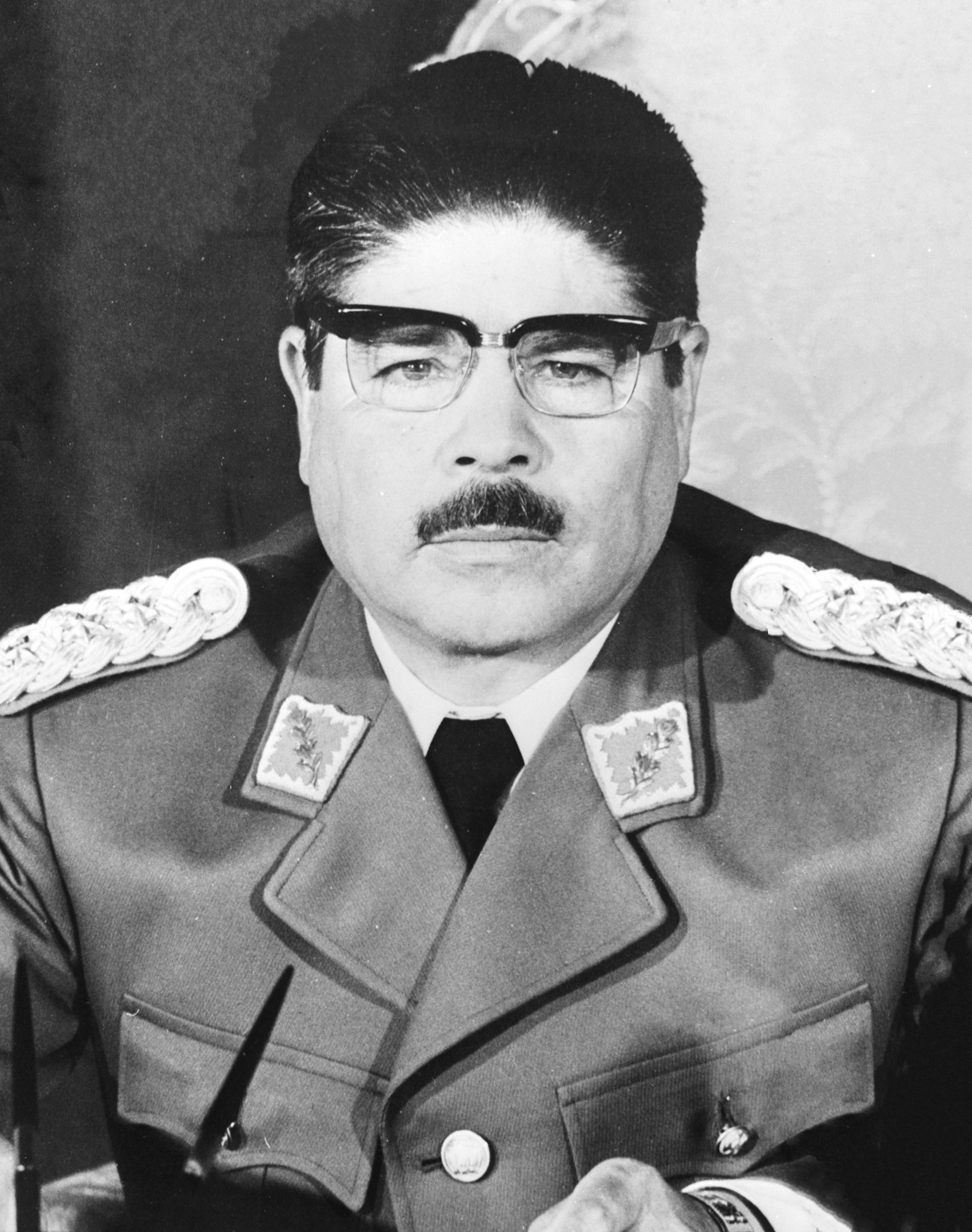
Third president of Bolivia in three days, Juan José Torres
- In a nationwide address, U.S. President Richard Nixon announced a five-point proposal for a truce to halt the Vietnam War, with all sides to begin a ceasefire and the release of all prisoners of war, in exchange for broader negotiations in the Paris Peace Talks The North Vietnamese and Viet Cong delegations to the Paris talks both denounced Nixon's proposal the next day as "a maneuver to deceive world opinion," but stopped short of rejecting it entirely.
- General Juan José Torres, a leftist officer of the military, took office as the new President of Bolivia "with a show of strength that toppled his rightist opponents", bringing an end to the two-day civil war. The only known casualties of the rebellion were ten leftist demonstrators who were shot by military officers in the mining town of Oruro.

== October 8, 1970 (Thursday) ==
- The first million dollar lottery prize in the U.S. was awarded to a family in West Hempstead, New York after George Ashton had been given a ticket as a present by his sister-in-law. The New York State Lottery had conducted a summer lottery, selling 5,500,000 tickets at three dollars apiece, with 14 tickets eligible for the grand prize, and the other 13 receiving prizes ranging from $10,000 to $100,000. Since three-fourths of the million dollar jackpot (equivalent to $6.6 million in 2020) would have been taken by state and federal taxes, the Ashtons arranged for a payout of $50,000 per year for 20 years, amounting to $20,000 per annum after taxes.
- Soviet author Aleksandr Solzhenitsyn was announced as the winner of the Nobel Prize in Literature, but would not be allowed to leave the Soviet Union in order to accept the award. The Union of Soviet Writers, which had expelled Solzhenitsyn in 1968, said in a statement in the Soviet newspaper Izvestia that "it is deplorable that the Nobel committee allowed itself to be drawn into an unseemly game... prompted by speculative political considerations."
- Born:
  - Matt Damon, American film actor and Oscar-winning screenwriter; in Los Angeles
  - Sadiq Khan, British politician and the first Muslim Mayor of London; in Tooting district, South London
- Died: Mitr Chaibancha, 36, Thai action film star who appeared in 266 films in a 14-year career, was killed during the filming of the movie Golden Eagle (Insee Thong) when he fell from a helicopter.

== October 9, 1970 (Friday) ==
- The Khmer Republic was proclaimed in Cambodia, four days after the southeast Asian nation's parliament voted unanimously to abolish the 1,168 year old monarchy Government authorities had been working on the eventual transition ever since March 18, when Prince Norodom Sihanouk was deposed. Prime Minister Lon Nol was inaugurated as the republic's first president.
- Born: Annika Sörenstam, Swedish professional golfer and multiple winner of Women's PGA championship and U.S. Women's Open, 2003 Women's British open winner, multiple LPGA player of the year; in Bro, Stockholm.

== October 10, 1970 (Saturday) ==
- Fiji became an independent nation at 10:00 in the morning, as the new Fijian flag was raised following the lowering of the Union Jack. On behalf of the United Kingdom, Prince Charles handed the "Documents of Constitutional Government" to the Prime Minister, Sir Kamisese Mara, at the Centre Park stadium in Suva, renouncing the deed of cession of October 10, 1874, that had made Fiji a British colony. Sir Robert Foster, the last colonial governor, became the first Governor-General of Fiji.
- Quebec's Minister of Labour, Pierre Laporte, became the second provincial government official to be kidnapped by the FLQ terrorist group during the October Crisis in Canada. Laporte was playing football with neighborhood children at a park across the road from his Robitaillie Street home in Saint-Lambert when two men, one of them carrying a machine gun, grabbed him and shoved him into a waiting car.
- U.S. aerial reconnaissance flights confirmed that the Soviet Union was dismantling a submarine base that it had been constructing in Cuba at Cienfuegos Bay, bringing a successful end to two weeks of quiet negotiations. The construction had been discovered on September 18 and revealed to the U.S. public on September 25. The events were described in an investigative report by the Chicago Tribune
- Born:
  - Matthew Pinsent, British Olympic rower, multiple World Rowing Championship and Olympic games champion; in Holt, Norfolk
  - Jokelyn Tienstra, Netherlands national handball team player; in Borculo (died of brain tumor, 2015)
- Died:
  - Édouard Daladier, 86, former Prime Minister of France between 1933 and 1940, later a prisoner of war after the German invasion of France in 1940
  - Paul Powell, 68, American politician and Illinois Secretary of State since 1965

== October 11, 1970 (Sunday) ==
- Eleven French Army soldiers were killed in an ambush by Chad Liberation Front rebels in the central African nation of Chad. At least 2,500 French troops had been in Chad since 1968 in order to support the government of President Francois Tombalbaye.
- Born: Lee Bong-ju, South Korean marathon runner, 2001 Boston Marathon winner and 1996 Olympic silver medalist; in Cheonan
- Died: César Falcón, 78, Peruvian journalist, playwright and novelist

== October 12, 1970 (Monday) ==
- President Nixon announced that the United States would withdraw 40,000 more troops from South Vietnam before Christmas.
- Born:
  - Kirk Cameron, American Evangelical Christian, TV and film actor known for Growing Pains TV show, later for the Left Behind film series; in Panorama City, Los Angeles
  - Charlie Ward, American multi-sport athlete who won college football's Heisman Trophy as a quarterback, but opted for a career as a point guard in the National Basketball Association; in Thomasville, Georgia
- Died:
  - Rojan (pen name for Feodor Rojankovsky), 78, Russian-born children's book illustrator
  - Mustafa Zaidi, 40, Pakistani Urdu language poet

== October 13, 1970 (Tuesday) ==
- Canada and the People's Republic of China agreed to establish diplomatic relations, and to exchange ambassadors within six months. John M. Fraser became the first Canadian envoy to Communist China on January 11.
- Typhoon Joan, also called Typhoon Sening, struck the Philippine island of Luzon and killed 620 people; another 148 people were killed in other locations by the storm
- Fiji joined the United Nations, 3 days after they gained independence from the United Kingdom.
- Professor Angela Davis was arrested at a Howard Johnson motel in midtown Manhattan, after two months of avoiding an indictment for murder and kidnapping. Davis would be acquitted of aiding and abetting the August 7 murder of California Judge Harold Haley, although she had been the owner of the guns used by the killers.
- The Warsaw Pact began its largest military maneuvers in its history as a war games exercise began in East Germany "Warsaw Pact War Maneuvers Begin".
- Saeb Salam formed a new government in Lebanon.
- Died:
  - Abuna Basilios, 89, Patriarch of the Ethiopian Orthodox Christian church.
  - Julia Culp, 90, Netherlands opera mezzo-soprano known as "The Dutch Nightingale"

== October 14, 1970 (Wednesday) ==
U.S.S.R.

P.R.C.

U.S.A.

- For the first time in world history, three nations conducted nuclear weapons tests on the same day. At 7:00 UTC, the Soviet Union carried out the largest underground nuclear test up to that time, a six-megaton blast, beneath Novaya Zemlya island in the Arctic, believed to be the type of warhead for a Soviet SS-9 multi-warhead missile. China exploded a three megaton bomb in an atmospheric test at Lop Nor in the Xinjiang province, in what was believed to be the test of a warhead for an intermediate range ballistic missile. Finally, the United States tested a weapon at the proving grounds in Nevada, which was described only as being in the low to intermediate range, no higher than 200 kilotons, believed to be the type used for a multi-warhead Poseidon or Minuteman 3 missile. A spokesman for the U.S. Atomic Energy Commission commented, "It sometimes takes several years to plan an atomic weapons test. This has got to be pure and sheer coincidence."
- Forty-four teenage boys from Seoul and a bus driver were killed near Onyang in South Korea's South Chungcheong Province when their bus was struck at an unguarded railroad crossing as they were returning home. Only 33 of the boys were able to escape before a fire consumed the rest of the bus. Early reports listed the number of deaths at 52 but eight more survivors were found at local hospitals; the bus was the third in a convoy of seven buses that were transporting 473 students back home after a visit to the Hyunchugsa shrine.
- An outbreak of cholera was first detected in Turkey, with the admission to the hospital of the first victim from a slum outside of Istanbul. Within four days, the pandemic had spread through the city and into neighboring towns and suburbs, killing 60 people and hospitalizing more than 2,000.
- Nine bus passengers in Honduras were killed near the airport in Tegucigalpa when the bus was struck by part of the landing gear and wheel of a Honduran Air Force plane that was coming in for a landing; the pilot was uninjured and, after exhausting fuel to prevent a fire, made an emergency landing on one wheel

== October 15, 1970 (Thursday) ==
- Thirty-five construction workers were killed in Australia when a section of Melbourne's West Gate Bridge over the Yarra River collapsed. Ten minutes before noon, a section of the bridge collapsed and plunged 155 feet (47 m) while 68 workers were on top of it or inside a hollow tunnel inside. Other workers were crushed when the 2000 ton section of concrete fell on top of huts directly below.
- Aeroflot Flight 244 was hijacked during a domestic flight in the Soviet Union and diverted to Turkey. The two hijackers, convicted embezzler Pranas Brazinskas and his 13-year-old son Algirdas, seized the An-24 during its flight from Batumi (in the Georgian SSR) to Krasnodar in the Russian SFSR, then commandeered the plane and landed in Turkey at Trabzon, where they surrendered. The Turkish government refused to allow extradition of the hijackers back to the U.S.S.R. and the father and son later resettled in the United States.
- The Organized Crime Control Act, including the Racketeer Influenced and Corrupt Organizations Act ("RICO"), was signed into law, allowing U.S. federal criminal prosecution and civil lawsuits against organized crime, including those who order others to do commit crimes.
- Voters in a national referendum in Egypt approved Anwar Sadat as president on a choice of yes or no. Out of about 7.1 million ballots cast, 6.4 million or 90.04% endorsed Nasser's former vice president and roughly 700,000 disapproved.
- The Baltimore Orioles defeated the Cincinnati Reds, 9 to 3, to win the World Series in Game 5 "Orioles Rout Reds, 9-3, To Win World Series".
- Died: Cid Ricketts Sumner, 79, American novelist best known for her "Tammy" novels that inspired a series of films, starting with Tammy and the Bachelor, was beaten to death in her home in Duxbury, Massachusetts.

== October 16, 1970 (Friday) ==
- Canadian Prime Minister Pierre Trudeau declared the only peacetime state of emergency in its history and outlawed the Quebec Liberation Front (FLQ), permitting provincial police and local authorities to arrest more than 250 people across the Quebec province. The War Measures Act, which permitted civil rights to be suspended for up to six months, was proclaimed at 4:00 in the morning local time and additional military forces were transferred into Quebec. The Act had been implemented only twice before, in 1914 and 1939, during Canada's entry into World War I and World War II. Trudeau told the House of Commons that "all extraordinary powers will be withdrawn as soon as it has been demonstrated that there is a cessation of the violence and threats of violence which made necessary their introduction." Emergency rule would not expire until April 30, 1971 and has not been implemented in Canada since then.
- With approval from U.S. President Nixon, a formal instruction was issued by the Central Intelligence Agency to its operatives in Chile, days before the expected election of Salvador Allende as the South American nation's new president. The memo, declassified in 1994, stated "It is firm and continuing policy that Allende be overthrown by a coup. It would be much preferable to have this transpire prior to 24 October, but efforts in this regard will continue vigorously beyond this date. We are to continue to generate maximum pressure toward this end, utilizing every appropriate resource. It is imperative that these actions be implemented clandestinely and securely so that the USG and American hand be well hidden." Peter Kornbluh, ed., Chile and the United States: Declassified Documents Relating to the Military Coup, September 11, 1973 (National Security Archive Electronic Briefing Book No. 8 ed.). George Washington University National Security Archive.
- The Tokyo newspaper Asahi Shimbun announced that it had become the first publication in history to have more than 10 million subscribers. The new figure was based on circulation of 6,055,000 for its morning edition and 4,002,000 for its afternoon edition.
- Born: Mehmet Scholl, German soccer football midfielder for Bayern Munich and the German national team; in Karlsruhe

== October 17, 1970 (Saturday) ==
- Quebec Labour Minister Pierre Laporte, kidnapped a week earlier by the Quebec Liberation Front, was murdered by strangulation. The body was found in the trunk of the automobile in the early morning hours of Sunday at Longueuil, near the Saint-Hubert Airport outside of Montreal.
- Born: Anil Kumble, Indian cricketer, bowler for Indian national team in test cricket play from 1990 to 2008; in Bangalore
- Died: Quincy Wright, 79, American political scientist known for A Study of War

== October 18, 1970 (Sunday) ==
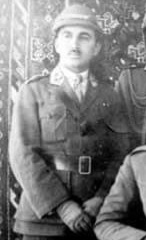
"King Zeid"

- The leader of Alpine County, California vowed to fight a Gay Liberation Front (GLF) proposal to register enough GLF members as voters to create to create the first "gay government" in the United States. At the time, Alpine County had a population of only 484 people, and the GLF had issued a statement that began "There is a county in California where 200 gays would constitute a majority of registered voters," and noted that a new state law required residency of only 90 days in a county in order to become a registered voter. Herbert Bruns, the chairman of the county's Board of Supervisors, said at a press conference in Markleeville that "Naturally, we'll do everything we can to prevent anyone taking over our county."
- Born: José Padilla, American citizen convicted of aiding foreign terrorists; in Brooklyn, New York City
- Died:
  - Prince Zeid bin Hussein, 72, pretender to the throne of the Iraq monarchy after his great-nephew King Faisal II and Crown Prince 'Abd al-Ilah were deposed and executed in 1958; his son, Prince Ra'ad bin Zeid, became the new pretender to the throne.
  - Floro Crisologo, 62, Philippine Congressman and a close ally of President Ferdinand Marcos, was assassinated while he was attending Sunday mass at his church in Vigan; according to some reports, he had just stood up to receive communion when he was struck. Crisologo had won office a year earlier in a bitter political campaign for office against Luis Singson.
  - Mairtin O Cadhain, 65, Irish language novelist

== October 19, 1970 (Monday) ==
- Typhoon Kate, also known as "Typhoon Titang" swept across the Philippine island of Mindanao, killing over 130 people in a day. In all, 631 people died in the Philippines, Indonesia and North and South Vietnam.
- Canada's House of Commons voted, 190 to 16, to pass a resolution endorsing the government's implementation of the War Measures Act in response to the October Crisis.
- A family of four and a guest were murdered in Santa Cruz, California at the home of a wealthy ophthalamogical surgeon as the random victims of a man whom the press dubbed "The Killer Prophet". Dr. Victor M. Ohta, his wife and their two sons, aged 12 and 11, were at home along with the doctor's secretary, Dorothy Cadwallader, when John Linley Frazier, a 24-year old drifter, invaded the premises and shot all five to death. The bodies were then dumped in a swimming pool. Frazier set the mansion ablaze, then drove off in the family's station wagon car. Frazier was discovered and arrested four days later. Originally sentenced to death, later commuted to life imprisonment, Frazier would hang himself in 2009.
- U.S. President Nixon made his second unannounced meeting with college students, stepping out of his limousine on the campus of Ohio State University, shaking hands with students who happened to be there, and conversing with them for the next half hour. When one student approached Nixon and said, "You can take my draft card!" the President replied, "I'm winding down the war, boy." With minimal Secret Service protection, Nixon then stood on the trunk of the limo, waved and began shaking hands, before leaving again.
- Born: Chris Kattan, American television and film comedian; in Sherman Oaks, California
- Died: Lázaro Cárdenas, 75, who served as the 44th President of Mexico from 1934 to 1940

== October 20, 1970 (Tuesday) ==
- The Soviet Union launched the Zond 8 lunar probe.
- At 2:51 in the afternoon, the North Tower of the World Trade Center became the world's tallest building when a piece of framework was fitted into place, bringing the tower's height to 1,254 feet (382 m), higher than the 1,250 feet (380 m) height of the Empire State Building
- Egyptian president Anwar Sadat named Mahmoud Fawzi as his prime minister.
- Died: Antoni Bohdziewicz, 64, Polish film director and screenplay writer

== October 21, 1970 (Wednesday) ==
- A U.S. Army plane strayed off course while making a short flight within Turkey between Erzurum and Kars, landing by mistake in the Soviet Union at the airport at Leninakan in the Azerbaijan SSR. The plane, which was originally thought to have crashed, was carrying Major General Edward C. D. Scherrer and Brigadier General Claude M. McQuarry Jr., as well as the pilot and a Turkish Army escort officer. According to U.S. Embassy officials who were allowed to interview the imprisoned officers, the pilot said that he had been approaching Kars when a gust of wind lifted the plane above the clouds, and that he made a routine landing in Leninakan, "still believing he was in Turkey". The Soviets held the generals and the others for almost three weeks, releasing them on November 10.
- Born: Louis Koo, Hong Kong film and TV actor; as Koo Tin-lok in Hong Kong
- Died:
  - Ernest Haller, 74, American cinematographer who won the Academy Award for best cinematography for Gone With the Wind, was killed in an auto accident.
  - Li Linsi, 74, Chinese diplomat and leader of non-violent resistance to the Japanese occupation of China during World War II

== October 22, 1970 (Thursday) ==
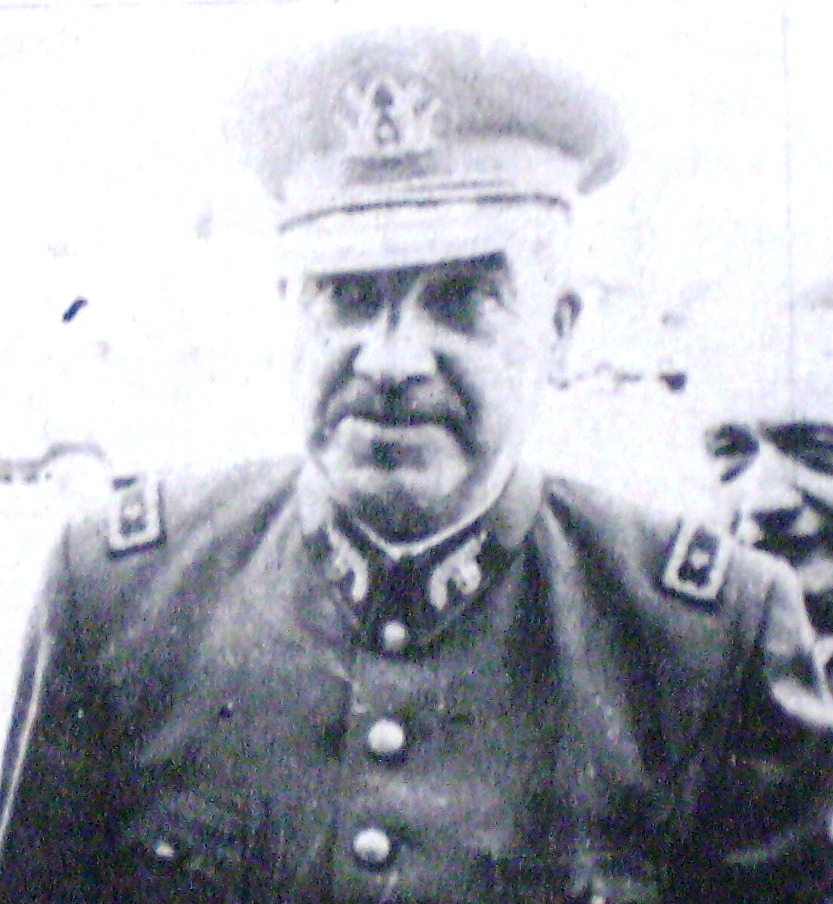
Maj. Gen. Schneider

- Major General René Schneider, the commander of the Chilean Army, was shot and fatally wounded in Santiago. Schneider's limousine was ambushed at a busy intersection in the El Golf section of the Chilean capital. Three cars blocked his vehicle, and gunmen broke out the rear window, firing eight shots at point blank range. The Chilean government under President Eduardo Frei declared a state of emergency. Schneider died three days later.
- Born: Javier Milei, President of Argentina since 2023; in Buenos Aires

== October 23, 1970 (Friday) ==
- Gary Gabelich drove the rocket-powered Blue Flame to an official land speed record of 622.407 mph (1,001.667 km/h) on the dry lake bed of the Bonneville Salt Flats in Utah. The record, the first above 1,000 km/h, would stand for nearly 13 years.
- Thirteen members of the crew of the Liberian oil tanker Pacific Glory were killed when the ship caught fire after colliding with another tanker, Allegro, off of Britain's Isle of Wight.
- Former Irish Finance Minister Charles Haughey, indicted on charges of conspiracy to smuggle weapons into Ireland, was acquitted of all charges.
- The Shrine of La Virgen de San Juan del Valle, located in San Juan, Texas and one of the most visited Roman Catholic shrines in the U.S., was destroyed by fire after a pilot deliberately flew his airplane and crashed into its roof. Although 230 people were in the complex at the time, the only person who died was the plane's pilot. A new shrine would be opened in 1980.

== October 24, 1970 (Saturday) ==
- Marxist Salvador Allende was elected President of Chile by a joint session of the Chilean Congress, where senators and deputies had the choice of Allende or the runner-up in the September 4 popular election, Jorge Alessandri. Allende had won a plurality of votes in September, but was far short of the required majority. Although Allesandri had appealed to his right-wing supporters in Congress to go ahead and vote for Allende in the interest of national unity, the final result was Allende 153, Allesandri 35, and seven blank votes. Five of the 200 members of Congress did not show up for the vote.
- Died:
  - Fan Changjiang, 61, Chinese journalist who was later imprisoned during the Cultural Revolution, committed suicide.
  - Richard Hofstadter, 54, American historian, died from leukemia.
  - Owen Cheatham, 68, U.S. businessman who founded the Georgia-Pacific Company and transformed it from a lumber wholesaler into a worldwide conglomerate and manufacturer of paper products.

== October 25, 1970 (Sunday) ==
- The Forty Martyrs of England and Wales, Roman Catholic men and women who had been executed during the English Reformation between 1535 and 1679, were canonized as saints in the Roman Catholic Church by Pope Paul VI. On May 4, 1535, John Houghton, Robert Lawrence, Augustine Webster and Richard Reynolds had been the first to be put to death.
- Tragedy marked the final scheduled day of operation for the California State Fairgrounds Race Track in Sacramento, where the Golden State 100 USAC race had been won three weeks earlier by Al Unser. Three drivers—Ernie Burssell, 27; Walt Reiff, 41; and Jimmie Gordon, 26—were killed in separate accidents during the running of the 100-lap super-modified and sprint car open competition In the 50-year history of the dirt track, there had never been a racing fatality until its final day.
- Died: General René Schneider, Commander of the Chilean Army, died of his wounds three days after being shot by kidnappers

== October 26, 1970 (Monday) ==
- Former world heavyweight boxing champion Muhammad Ali, who had been stripped of his title after refusing to enter military service, began his comeback in his first fight since 1967, defeating Jerry Quarry in the third round of a 15-round bout in Atlanta
- U.S. President Nixon issued an executive order requiring all federal government ground vehicles to begin using unleaded gasoline if possible. At the time, only 54% of the U.S. government cars and trucks (324,000 out of 600,000) had engines that would operate on low-lead fuel; the 46% that used leaded fuel included the presidential limousine. In 1970, federal vehicles used 0.5% of all gasoline sold in the U.S., and Nixon urged the governors of all 50 U.S. states to follow the federal example, noting that "our joint action would offer the gasoline refinery and marketing industries a sizable incentive to produce and distribute low-lead and led-free gasoline
- Nixon also signed the Fair Credit Reporting Act, the Bank Secrecy Act and the Legislative Reorganization Act of 1970 into law, the improvements made by the U.S. Congress to speed up its process of considering and passing proposed bills.
- Garry Trudeau's politically themed comic strip, Doonesbury, made its debut in approximately 25 newspapers in the United States as did Mell Lazarus's comic strip about an opinionated senior citizen, Momma. Doonesbury was the first of a new wave of comic strips offered by Universal Press Syndicate.
- Died: Hugh Gordon Cummins, 79, Premier of Barbados from 1958 to 1961 when it was still a British colony

== October 27, 1970 (Tuesday) ==
- The Comprehensive Drug Abuse Prevention and Control Act of 1970 was signed into law, which included the Controlled Substances Act. The new law reduced the federal charges for most narcotics possession or use from felonies to misdemeanors, but increased the federal criminal penalties for selling illegal narcotics.
- The commander of the Ecuadorian Air Force (FAE), General Cesar Rohon Sandoval, was kidnapped while being chauffeured through Quito while returning from a reception at the Paraguayan Embassy. The abduction took place on the day that General Rohn was scheduled to speak at ceremonies marking the 50th anniversary of the FAE in 1920. Rohon's captors abandoned him the next day in mountainous jungle area after a helicopter flew close to where they were hiding, and the general then spent four days hiking before reaching a highway
- Jesus Christ Superstar was first placed on sale as a two-disc record album of the studio recording of a rock opera written by Andrew Lloyd Webber and Tim Rice, without having been performed before a live audience.
- Born: Jonathan Stroud, English novelist and fantasy fiction author; in Bedford, Bedfordshire

== October 28, 1970 (Wednesday) ==
- In Jordan, the government of Ahmad Toukan resigned. King Hussein named Wasfi al-Tal as the new prime minister.
- A cholera outbreak in eastern Slovakia caused Hungary to close its border with Czechoslovakia.
- U.S. Army Captain Jeffrey R. MacDonald was released from incarceration at Fort Bragg, North Carolina, after his commanding officer dismissed charges of murder against MacDonald for the murder of his wife and two daughters. Captain MacDonald, a physician, was honorably discharged and returned to his medical practice, but would be arrested again in 1975 after being indicted for the murders by a North Carolina grand jury.
- The first officer of a TWA airliner was able to make an emergency landing in Cedar Rapids, Iowa, after the pilot died of a heart attack during the flight. Captain Herbert Shively, 49, was fatally stricken shortly after taking off from Chicago on the flight to San Francisco.
- Born: Greg Eagles, American voice actor known for portraying the Grim Reaper on Grim & Evil and The Grim Adventures of Billy & Mandy
- Died: Kyōichi Sawada, 34, Pulitzer Prize-winning Japanese photographer, and Frank Frosch, American news reporter, were executed by Khmer Rouge guerrillas in Cambodia.

== October 29, 1970 (Thursday) ==
- In San Jose, California, U.S. President Nixon encountered an angry mob of over 5,000 demonstrators and violence that was "the worst Nixon has faced since becoming President." Nixon was at a political rally for Republican candidates at the city's municipal auditorium, and encountered booing as he walked to his car. When Nixon stood on the back of the presidential limousine and raised his arms in the "V for Victory" gesture, someone in the crowd threw a rock close to him. After he was back in his car, the crowd pelted the limousine and a motorcade with rocks, eggs and bottles, and riot police were necessary to clear a path for the cars to leave. According to the Diary entry for that day from Presidential Aid H. R. Haldeman the protesters had unwittingly fallen right into the hands of President Nixon who had desired such a news worthy confrontation so that he could continue to stoke up his "Silent Majority" appeal to Middle America to use their vote against these extreme minority groups.
- Born: Edwin van der Sar, Netherlands soccer football goalkeeper for the national team from 1995 to 2008; in Voorhout

== October 30, 1970 (Friday) ==
- Amtrak, the National Railroad Passenger Corporation, was created as an independent, government-subsidized corporation to revitalize public train travel
- Born:
  - Xie Jun, Chinese chess grandmaster who was Women's World Chess Champion from 1991 to 1996 and 1999 to 2001; in Baoding, Hebei province
  - Ben Bailey, American comedian and host of the game show Cash Cab; in Bowling Green, Kentucky
  - Nia Long, award-winning African-American film and TV actress; in Brooklyn

== October 31, 1970 (Saturday) ==
- Tropical Storm Louise, the most powerful monsoon to strike Indochina since 1964, caused massive flooding in North Vietnam and South Vietnam, bringing a virtual halt to the Vietnam War in the provinces closest to the Demilitarized Zone. The final death toll was 293 people, and 200,000 were left homeless.
- Born: Linn Berggren, Swedish singer and songwriter for Ace of Base; in Gothenburg
