= David Webb =

David Webb may refer to:

== Politics and activism ==
- David Webb (anti-censorship campaigner) (1931–2012), British actor and anti-censorship activist
- David Webb (politician) (born 1954), American politician from Kansas
- David Webb (Hong Kong activist) (1965–2026), British-born corporate and economic governance activist in Hong Kong

== Science ==
- D. A. Webb (David Allardice Webb, 1912–1994), Irish botanist
- David C. Webb (1928–2016), Irish-born philanthropist and aerospace consultant
- David Webb (pharmacologist) (born 1953), British pharmacologist
- David Webb (mathematician), American mathematician

== Sports ==
- David Webb (rowing) (1943–2020), British Olympic rowing coxswain
- David Webb (footballer) (born 1946), English footballer and manager
- David Webb (runner) (born 1982), British marathon runner

== Other ==
- David Webb (jeweler) (1925–1975), American jeweler
- David Webb (filmmaker) (born 1935), British filmmaker and caver
- Forest DLG (David L. G. Webb, born 1984), British music producer and DJ
- David Webb (character) or Jason Bourne, the title character of several Robert Ludlum and Eric Van Lustbader novels and the films based on them
