= Mission to Mars (disambiguation) =

Mission to Mars is a 2000 science fiction film directed by Brian De Palma.

Mission to Mars may also refer to:

== Space missions ==
- Exploration of Mars, the study of Mars by spacecraft, beginning in the late 20th century
  - List of missions to Mars
- Human mission to Mars (crewed a.k.a. manned)

== Other uses ==
- Mission to Mars (attraction), a former attraction at Walt Disney theme parks
- Mission to Mars (novel), a novel by Patrick Moore
- "Mission to Mars", a 2006 episode of The Backyardigans
- Mission to Mars: My Vision for Space Exploration, a 2013 book by astronaut Buzz Aldrin and Leonard David
- "Mission to Mars", a song by thrash metal band Megadeth from the 2022 album The Sick, the Dying... and the Dead!

== See also ==
- Mars mission (disambiguation)
