= Magnificent Desolation =

"Magnificent desolation" is a phrase Buzz Aldrin used to describe the Moon surface during the Apollo 11 mission.

It may refer to:

- Magnificent Desolation (book), an autobiography by Buzz Aldrin
- Magnificent Desolation: Walking on the Moon 3D, a 2005 IMAX 3D documentary film
