= Mars mission =

Mars mission may refer to:

== Space missions ==
- Exploration of Mars, or any mission to assist in this endeavour
  - List of missions to Mars
    - List of Mars orbiters
      - Mars Orbiter Mission, India's first interplanetary mission
    - Mars rover mission(s)
  - Human mission to Mars
    - List of crewed Mars mission plans

== Other uses ==
- Lego Mars Mission, a theme for Lego toys

== See also ==
- Mission to Mars (disambiguation)
