= ShareSpace foundation =

American educational non-profit organization

ShareSpace is a non-profit educational foundation focused on the benefits of the STEAM disciplines‍—‌science, technology, engineering, arts, and math‍—‌for both the individual young person and society as a whole.

== History ==
At its founding by astronaut and lunar pioneer Buzz Aldrin in 1998, ShareSpace was intended to be used for the promotion of space tourism, with the larger goal of encouraging commercial space travel and exploration.

Aldrin himself, however, has documented both the challenges facing this goal and the logjam of approaches which have grown up in respect to it. In consequence, ShareSpace has been relaunched with its current STEAM educational focus. An initial result of the new focus was announced by the foundation in May 2015: a strategic partnership with Destination Imagination, another non-profit dedicated to education, which has participants across the United States and in more than 30 other countries.

== A STEAM pioneer ==
ShareSpace includes the arts as one of the core disciplines which it promotes; thus, it uses the acronym STEAM as opposed to STEM:

Just as the term STEM (science, technology, engineering and math), made its big movement in the 80s, STEAM is doing that now. Buzz Aldrin’s ShareSpace Foundation is a strong supporter in the belief that by incorporating “arts” into the STEM equation even greater results will be achieved by people at all stages of their education.

The game is changing. It isn’t just about math and science anymore. It’s about creativity, imagination and above all, innovation. ShareSpace lights the fire and inspires children to explore the incredible world of science, technology, engineering, math AND arts.

In his role as spokesperson for ShareSpace, Aldrin cites the smartphone as an example of an important technological development in which artistry has played a key role.

== Notable Examples ==
=== Buzz Aldrin ===
The Apollo program in which Buzz Aldrin participated stands as one of the great historical triumphs of applied education. Aldrin, for example, is the only one of the early astronaut candidates to have entered the program with a doctorate – an ScD in astronautics from the Massachusetts Institute of Technology (MIT).

For a foundation which encourages young people to seize the reins of their own education, the story of Aldrin's doctoral thesis is also relevant. What was to become the Apollo program had been announced by President John F. Kennedy in 1961. Aldrin wanted to be part of it, and so he chose to write his doctoral thesis on a topic which would prove irresistible to NASA: a method by which astronauts might use primitive "line of sight" techniques to accomplish sophisticated orbital rendezvous maneuvers.
