= Magnificent Desolation (book) =

2009 book by Buzz Aldrin

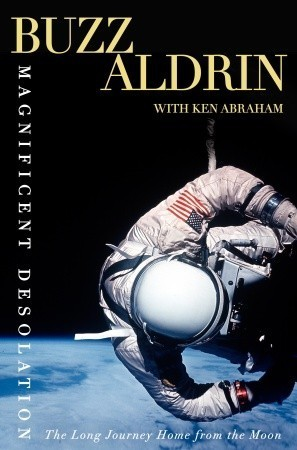
- Author: Buzz Aldrin and Ken Abraham
- Cover artist: David Tran
- Language: English
- Genre: Science
- Publisher: Harmony Books
- Publication date: May 2009
- Publication place: United States
- Media type: Print (Hardcover)
- Pages: 326 pp (hardcover)
- ISBN: 978-0-307-46345-6 (hardcover edition)

Magnificent Desolation: The Long Journey Home from the Moon is the second of two autobiographical books written by Buzz Aldrin, the Apollo 11 astronaut who with Neil Armstrong made the first human Moon landing. The 2009 book concentrates mainly on the period after his return from space, and illuminates many of the difficulties he had in coping with his instant world-wide fame following the achievement.

In the book Aldrin writes candidly about depression, the breakup of his marriage, the isolation and loss of a sense of purpose after leaving NASA, and a decade of struggle to overcome alcoholism. The Guardian notes that "Aldrin removes his space helmet and shows us the very human face of an all-American hero."
