= David C. Webb =

David Charles Napier Webb (November 20, 1928 – October 1, 2016) was a consultant to government agencies, corporations, universities, and nonprofit organizations on various aspects of aerospace development, technology, and education.

== Career ==
Webb was recruited by Apollo 11 astronaut, Buzz Aldrin, to serve as founding full professor and chairman of the Department of Space Studies, Center for Aerospace Sciences, University of North Dakota. At the university, Webb created and established the world's first interdisciplinary graduate degree program in Space Studies. He recruited the founding faculty including, Dick Parker, Joanne Gabrynowicz, Jim Vedda, and Grady Blount. After Webb's departure from University of North Dakota in 1990, the program was taken over by selenologist Chuck Wood, who expanded the program into the first Internet-based degree program in space studies (1993).

Webb and Blount wrote an eight million dollar grant proposal to the United States Department of Agriculture which funded the construction and establishment of the Earth System Science Institute at UND (1988–1989), now known as the Department of Earth System Science and Policy. Webb, Blount, and Vedda hosted the first (and only) International Conference on Hypersonic Flight in the 21st Century (1988).

== Personal awards and recognition ==
- Lifetime Achievement Recognition from the International Space University/International Singularity University, 2009.
- NASA/DOD, National Aerospace Plane Program: "For Outstanding Vision of the Impact of Hypersonic Technologies on the World Economy and Support of the National Aerospace Plane Program." (1990).
- International Space University: "For Outstanding Dedication and Leadership of the International Space University During its Critical Launch Phase 1987-88." (1989).
- First Frederick E. Osborn Award—International L5 Society: "For leadership in building an international pro-space movement." (1985)
- Students for the Exploration and Development of Space (SEDS): First Arthur C. Clarke Award, "In recognition of outstanding personal contributions in education towards the peaceful uses of outer space." (1983). (David C. Webb was the recipient of the Award just before Carl Sagan)
- Government of Canada, Queen Elizabeth II Silver Jubilee Medal: "In appreciation of worthy and devoted service." (1977).
