= Mission to Mars: My Vision for Space Exploration =

2013 book by Buzz Aldrin

- Author: Buzz Aldrin; Leonard David
- Language: English
- Genre: Non-fiction
- Publisher: National Geographic Books
- Publication date: May 7, 2013
- Publication place: United States

Mission to Mars: My Vision for Space Exploration is a 2013 book written by retired NASA astronaut Buzz Aldrin and Leonard David. The book was released on May 7, 2013 by National Geographic Books. In the book, Aldrin outlines his plan for humans to be able to colonize Mars by the year 2035. The books goes over a number of past and then current space concepts, policy, and future mission concepts. He encouraged future missions to not focus on strictly on Mars exploration, but also on Mars settlement.

The books goes beyond just Mars missions to review the overall space exploration vision-scape, such as considering the viability of Lunar missions and international cooperation in space.

National Geographic released a video trailer for the book.

== See also ==
- Mars to Stay
