= List of craters with ray systems =

This is a list of craters with ray systems. In the following tables, the listed coordinates and the diameter are for the crater.

== Mercury ==
The following craters on Mercury possess ray systems.

Crater	Latitude	Longitude	Diameter
Ailey	45.5° S	182.1° W	21 km
Amaral	26.4° S	242.3° W	105 km
Bartók	29.22° S	135.06° W	118 km
Bashō	32.4° S	170.36° W	74.62 km
Bek	21.2° N	51.0° W	32 km
Berkel	13.6° S	333.5° W	21 km
Copley	38.4° S	85.2° W	34 km
Cunningham	30.41° N	202.93° W	37 km
David	17.66° S	292.13° W	23 km
Debussy	33.9° S	347.5° W	85 km
Degas	37.4° N	126.4° W	60 km
Du Fu	25.0° N	93.66° W	33 km
Enwonwu	9.9° S	238.4° W	38 km
Erté	27.44° N	117.33° W	48.5 km
Fonteyn	32.82° N	264.49° W	29 km
Han Kan	71.6° S	143.8° W	50 km
Hitomaro	16.07° S	15.65° W	105 km
Hodgkins	29.2° N	341.74° W	19 km
Hokusai	58.3° N	342.3° W	95 km
Hovnatanian	7.6° S	187.5° W	34 km
Ives	32.87° S	111.99° W	18 km
Kuiper	11.3° S	31.5° W	62 km
Kulthum	50.72° N	93.53° W	31 km
Matabei	39.7° S	13.9° W	24 km
Mena	0.17° S	124.73° W	15 km
Nureyev	11.68° N	173.13° W	16 km
Petipa	11.54° S	338.95° W	12 km
Popova	34.72° S	66.73° W	34 km
Qi Baishi	4.2° S	196.0° W	16 km
Snorri	9.17° S	83.24° W	21 km
Tyagaraja	3.89° S	148.9° W	97 km
Waters	8.96° S	105.45° W	15 km
Xiao Zhao	10.58° N	236.16° W	24 km

== Mars ==
The following craters on Mars possess ray systems (These were discovered in Thermal Emission Imaging System infrared images).

Crater	Latitude	Longitude	Diameter
Dilly	37.4° N	126.4° E	2 km
Unnamed	22.5° N	151.4° E	2.5 km
Gratteri	17.7° S	199.9° E	6.9 km
Tomini	16.3° N	125.9° E	7.4 km
Zumba	28.7° S	226.9° E	3.3 km
Zunil	7.7° N	166° E	10.4 km
Corinto	16.9° N	141.7° E	13.5 km

== Moon ==
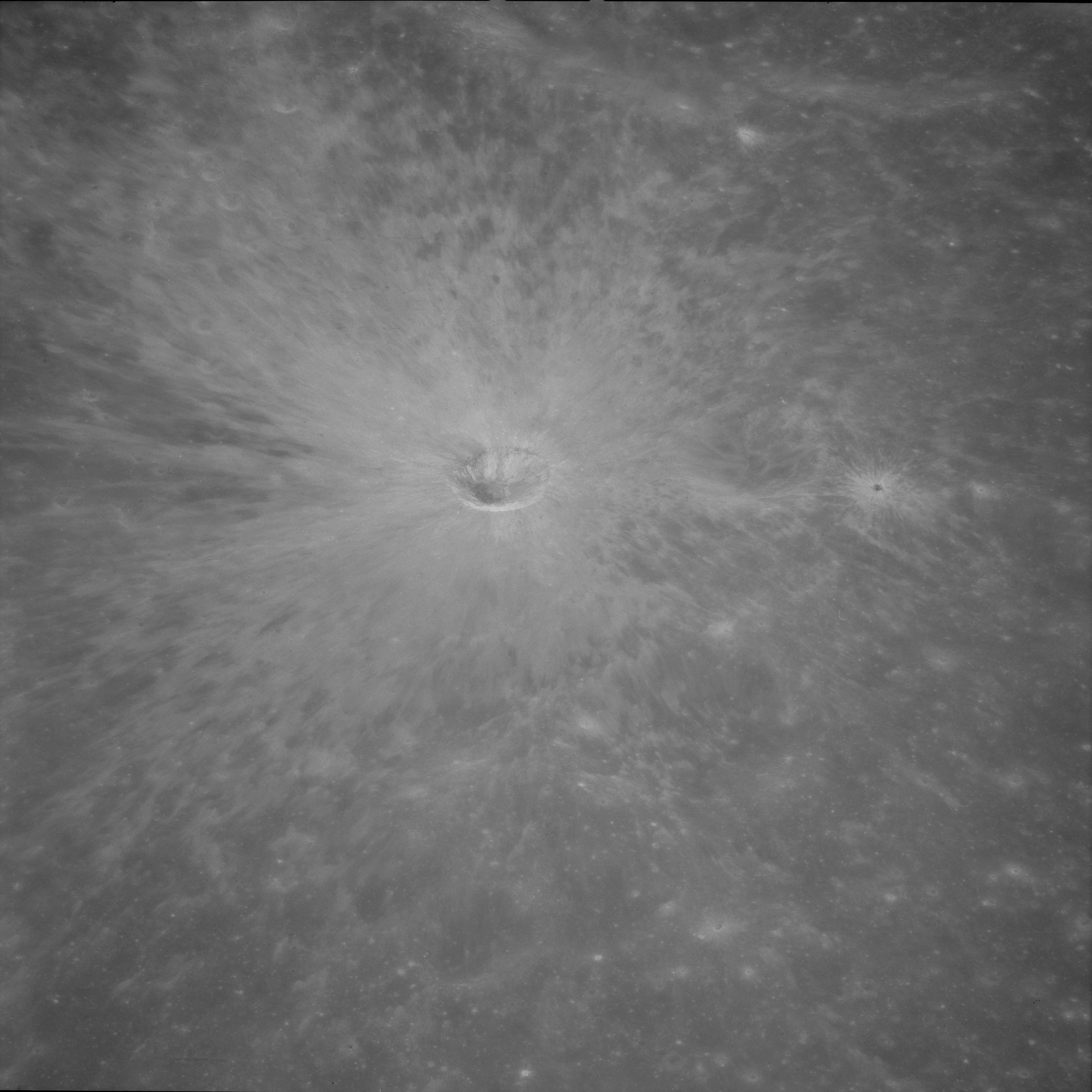
The unnamed crater west of Saenger (Apollo 11 image AS11-42-6285)

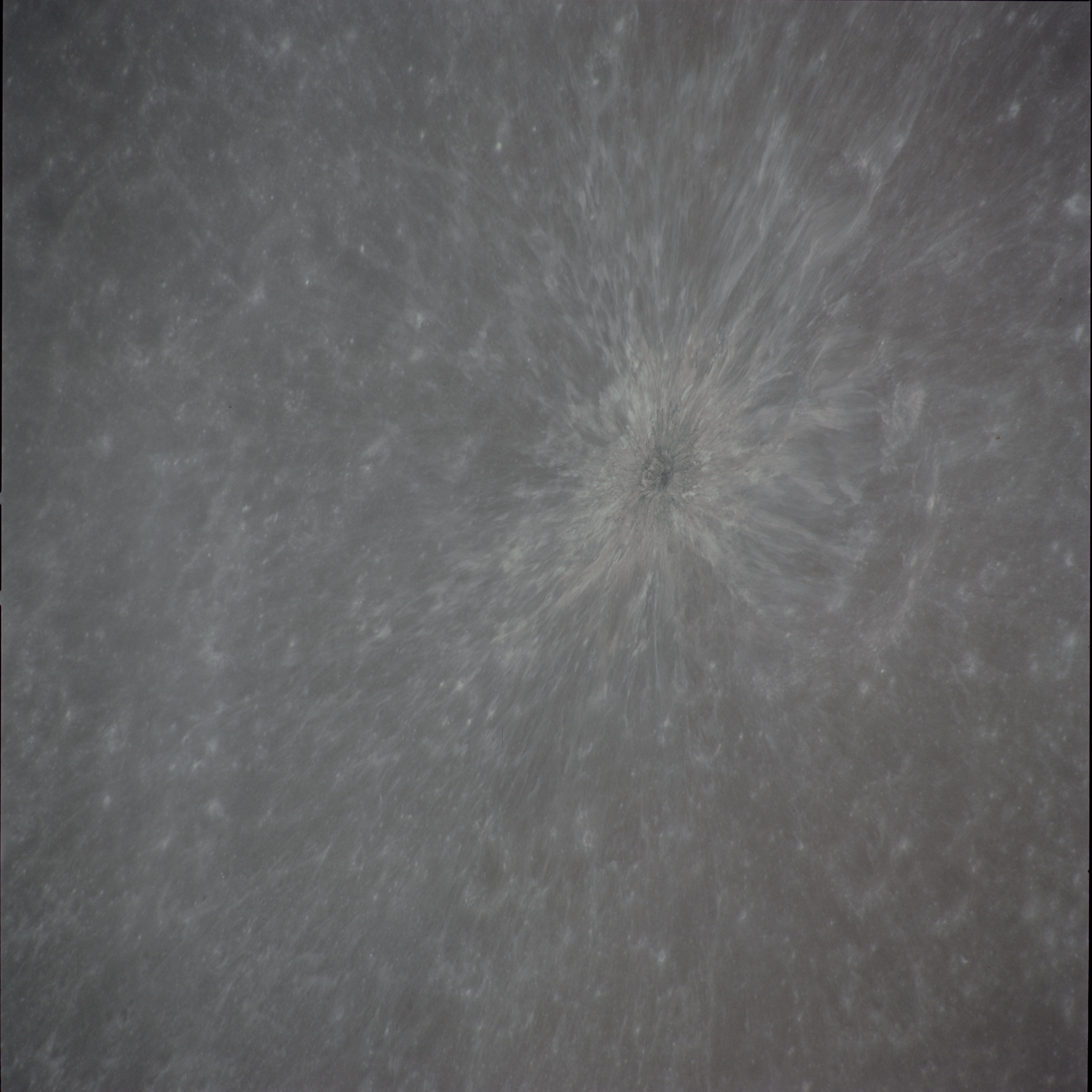
The unnamed crater within Balmer (Apollo 14 image AS14-72-10030)

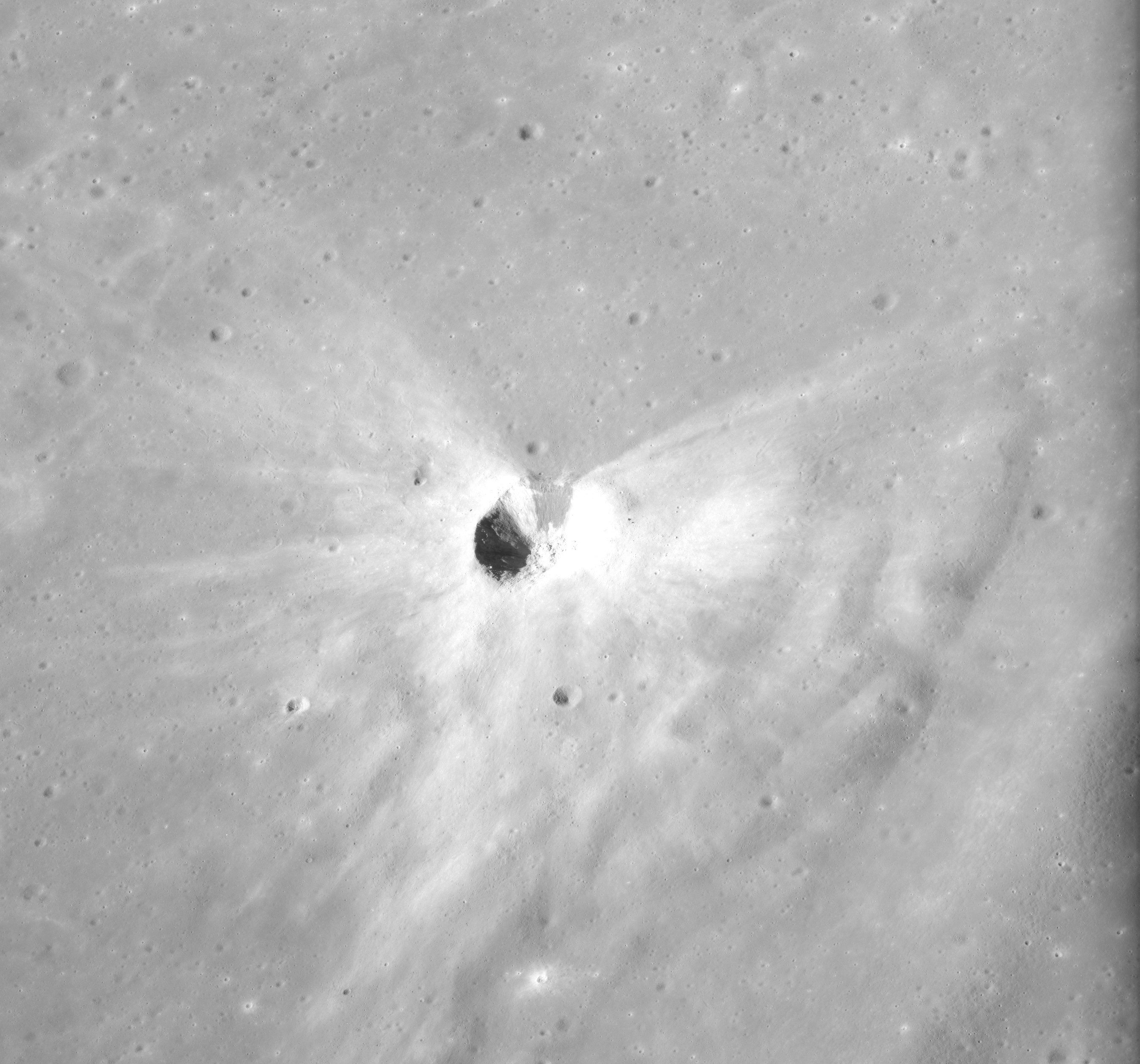
The unnamed crater within Daguerre

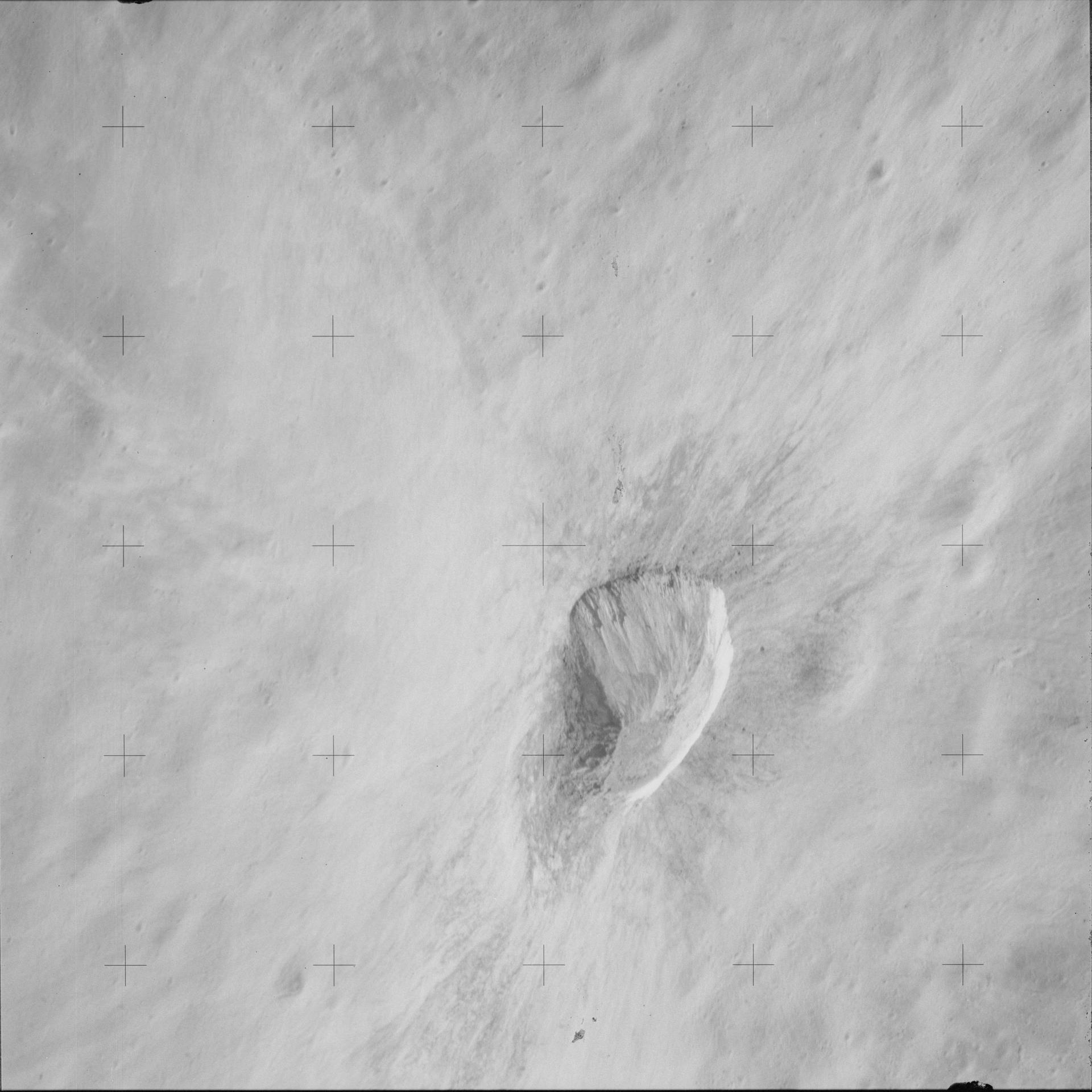
Oblique closeup of the unnamed crater on the north rim of Gibbs (Apollo 15 image AS15-81-10920)

This table lists the lunar impact craters that have ray systems. Crater names followed by a letter are satellite craters associated with the primary crater of the same name. The list is not comprehensive because there are hundreds or thousands of small craters with ray systems that are not named. A few unnamed craters photographed during the Apollo program are included.

Crater	Latitude	Longitude	Diameter
Abbe H	58.2° S	177.9° E	25 km
Abulfeda E	16.7° S	10.2° E	6 km
Abulfeda Q	12.8° S	12.3° E	3 km
Anaxagoras	73.4° N	10.1° W	50 km
Aristarchus	23.7° N	47.4° W	40 km
Aristillus	33.9° N	1.2° E	55 km
Autolycus	30.7° N	1.5° E	39 km
Bandfield	5.40° S	90.77° E	1.0 km
Byrgius A	24.5° S	63.7° W	19 km
Censorinus	0.4° S	32.7° E	3.8 km
Chaplygin B (Chappy)	4.08° S	151.69° E	1.5 km
Cleostratus J	61.3° N	83.8° W	20 km
Copernicus	9.7° N	20.1° W	93 km
Crookes	10.3° S	164.5° W	49 km
Das	26.6° S	136.8° W	38 km
Dionysius	2.8° N	17.3° E	18 km
Encke X	0.9° N	40.3° E	3 km
Fechner T	59.1° S	122.9° E	14 km
Galilaei D	8.75° N	62.75° W	0.9 km
Giordano Bruno	35.9° N	102.8° E	22 km
Glushko	8.4° N	77.6° W	43 km
Goddard A	17.07° N	89.71° E	11 km
Godin	1.8° N	10.2° E	34 km
Grigg E	13.51° N	125.68° E	1.40 km
Guthnick	47.7° S	93.9° W	36 km
Harpalus	52.6° N	43.4° W	39 km
Hawke	66.61° S	128.65° E	13.2 km
Herigonius K	12.83° S	36.46° W	3.07 km
Jackson	22.4° N	163.1° W	71 km
Janssen K	46.19° S	42.31° E	15 km
Kepler	8.1° N	38.0° W	31 km
King	5.0° N	120.5° W	76 km
Kirch E	36.5° N	6.9° W	3 km
Kirch G	37.4° N	8.1° W	3 km
Korolev Z	1.15° N	159.48° W	18 km
Langrenus	8.9° S	61.1° E	127 km
La Condamine S	57.3° N	25.2° W	4 km
La Pérouse A	9.3° S	74.7° E	4 km
Larmor Q	28.6° N	176.2° E	22 km
Lassell D	14.5° S	10.5° W	2 km
Laue G	27.8° N	93.2° W	36 km
Lichtenberg	31.8° N	67.7° W	20 km
Lichtenberg B	33.3° N	61.5° W	5 km
Linné	27.7° N	11.8° E	2.4 km
Mee Q	43.6° S	33.9° W	1 km
Messier (and Messier A)	1.9° S	47.6° E	11 km
Moore F	20.2° N	176.1° W	25 km
Necho	5.0° S	123.1° E	30 km
Noggerath F	48.0° S	46.9° W	9 km
North Ray	8.82° S	15.48° E	0.95 km
Ohm	18.5° N	113.5° W	64 km
Petavius B	19.9° S	57.1° E	33 km
Petit	2.3° N	63.5° E	5 km
Pierazzo	3.3° N	100.24° W	9.29 km
Piton B	39.3° N	0.1° W	5 km
Poincaré X	53.8° S	161.9° E	19 km
Posidonius Y	30.03° N	24.91° E	2 km
Proclus	16.1° N	46.8° E	28 km
Reimarus H	49.3° S	62.3° E	10 km
Ryder	44.5° N	143.2° E	17 km
Shioli	13.33° S	25.23° E	0.27 km
Sirsalis F	13.5° S	60.1° W	13 km
South Ray	9.15° S	15.38° E	0.7 km
Stella	19.91° N	29.76° E	0.42 km
Stevinus A	31.8° S	51.6° E	8 km
Taruntius	5.6° N	46.5° E	56 km
Thales	61.8° N	50.3° E	31 km
Timocharis	26.7° N	13.1° W	33 km
Triesnecker	4.2° N	3.6° E	26 km
Tycho	43.4° S	11.1° W	102 km
Unnamed (within Balmer)	18.93° S	69.15° E	1 km
Unnamed (within Daguerre)	11.80° S	33.14° E	2 km
Unnamed (rim of Gibbs)	17.48° S	85.20° E	5 km
Unnamed (west of Saenger)	4.57° N	101.14° E	4 km
Vaughan	41.41° S	171.85° W	3 km
Ventris M	4.9° S	158.0° E	95 km
Wargo	27.68° N	148.62° W	13.9 km
Werner D	21.7° S	3.2° E	2 km
Zhinyu	45.34° S	176.15° E	3.8 km

== See also ==
- List of craters on the Moon
