= Kupalo (crater) =

Impact crater on Ceres

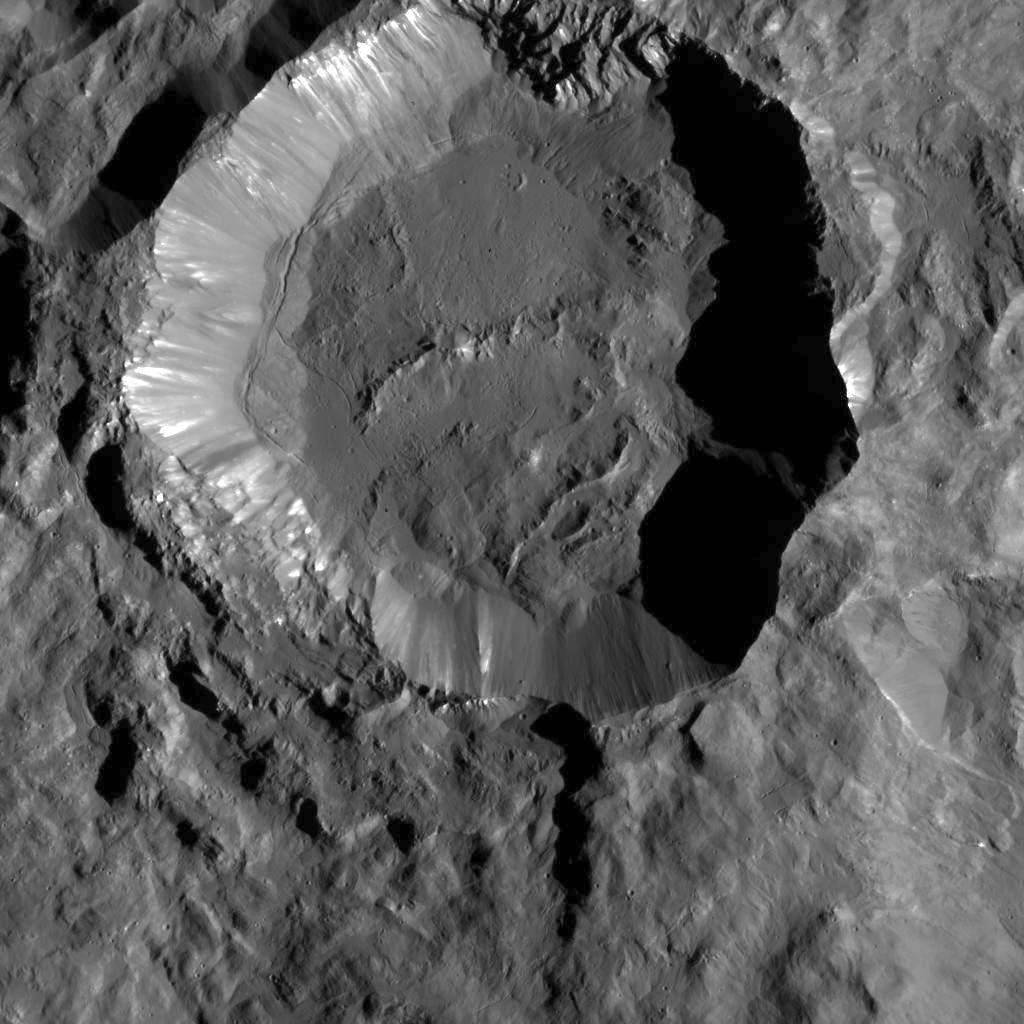
- View of Kupalo from roughly the southeast
- Feature type: Complex impact crater
- Location: Ceres
- Coordinates: 39.44°S 173.20°E
- Diameter: 26 km
- Discoverer: Dawn
- Eponym: Kupala

Kupalo is an impact crater on the southern hemisphere of the dwarf planet Ceres. It is a young complex crater, with a long central ridge and a sharp rim. Its ejecta blanket is bright and prominent. The crater is named after Kupala, the deity of vegetation and harvest in Slavic mythologies. Its name was approved by the International Astronomical Union on 4 December 2015.

== Characteristics ==
Kupalo is located in Ceres's southern hemisphere near the boundary between its smoother equatorial regions and more rugged high latitudes. It is a bowl-shaped complex crater with a sharp crater rim and wall slopes above 20°, typical of a young crater. Its crater floor lies 2,300 m (7,500 ft) on average below its rim. Most of the floor is smooth, though it becomes rougher in the southwest. The base of the western wall has several deep fractures which are located in areas of brighter material. The northern crater wall has a prominent, stepped outcrop. The center is occupied by a long ridge, with lobes of material appearing to originate from its crest. The ridge spans east-northeast to south-southwest for 12 km (7.5 mi) before turning due south for 4 km (2.5 mi). It rises between 300 m (980 ft) and 500 m (1,600 ft) above the crater floor. A second ridge lies to the south. Both are interrupted by younger dome-shaped structures.

Several outward-facing landslides scar Kupalo's flanks. A large landslide on the western wall left behind a 16 km (9.9 mi) wide, 1.5 km (0.93 mi) tall scarp. The displaced material hosts cracks, secondary scarps, and tilted blocks with a short run, unusual for landslides on Ceres. The landslide may have been triggered by Kupalo's formation or nearby Juling's later formation. Other, smaller landslides occurred on the west and south, with their deposits extending up to 10 km (6.2 mi). Its ejecta blanket partly overlaps with Juling's. Bright, thin crater rays extend up to 80 km (50 mi) away from Kupalo.

=== Formation ===
According to the Lunar Derived System of crater counting, Kupalo is estimated to be about 4.5 million years old. Its stepped outcrops and landslide morphology suggests that the local crust was brittle and behaved unevenly during its formative impact event. A shallow pre-impact deposit of brines or salts likely was responsible for the bright ejecta field, but the origin of the bright material on the central ridge may have been deeper, as central peaks are usually composed of material from deeper in the crust. A team of astronomers led by J. Hernandez proposed two hypotheses to explain the distribution of Kupalo's bright material. In the first hypothesis, the bright material is originally concentrated in a subsurface deposit fed by a dike. The material is excavated and spread by the impact, and the dike head is broken up as the central ridge rebounds. In the second hypothesis, the subsurface deposit is not connected to a dike. Bright material is instead exposed during the later stages of Kupalo's formation by wall collapses and landslides.
