= Zunil (crater) =

Crater on Mars

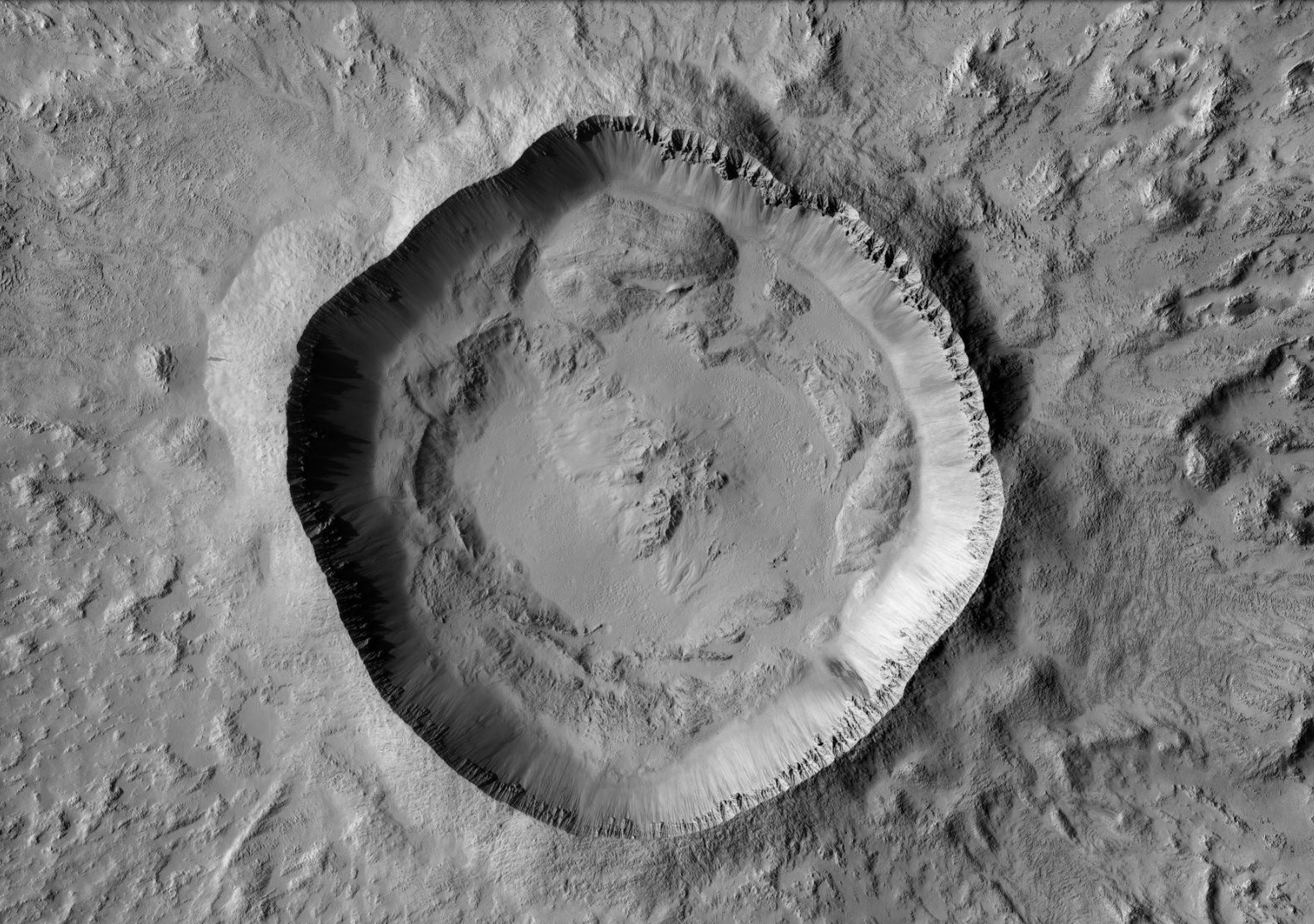
- Planet: Mars
- Region: Athabasca Valles
- Coordinates: 7.8°N 193.9°W
- Quadrangle: Elysium
- Diameter: 10.26 km (6.38 mi)
- Eponym: Zunil, Guatemala

Zunil is an impact crater near the Cerberus Fossae on Mars, with a diameter of 10.26 kilometres (6.38 miles). It is named after the town of Zunil in Guatemala. The crater is located in the Elysium quadrangle. Visible in images from the Viking 1 and Viking 2 Mars orbiters in the 1970s, Zunil was subsequently imaged at higher resolution for the first time by the Mars Global Surveyor (MGS) Mars Orbiter Camera (MOC) in 2000.

A ray system associated with the Zunil impact, visible in infrared images from the Mars Odyssey Thermal Emission Spectrometer (THEMIS) was later detailed by McEwen et al. (2003); before this, large craters with ray systems had not been seen on Mars.

The debris from a recent landslide was first spotted on the south-east wall of the crater by the Mars Global Surveyor Mars Orbiter Camera (MOC) in 2003, and was subsequently imaged at higher resolution by the Mars Reconnaissance Orbiter High Resolution Imaging Science Experiment (HiRISE) in December 2006.

== Formation ==
The impact which formed Zunil occurred no more than a few million years ago and hence the crater is in a relatively pristine form. It was probably not produced in a high-velocity impact, such as from a comet. If the interpretation that Zunil is the source of the basaltic shergottite meteorites is correct, then the crater formed in basalt deposited 165–177 million years ago.

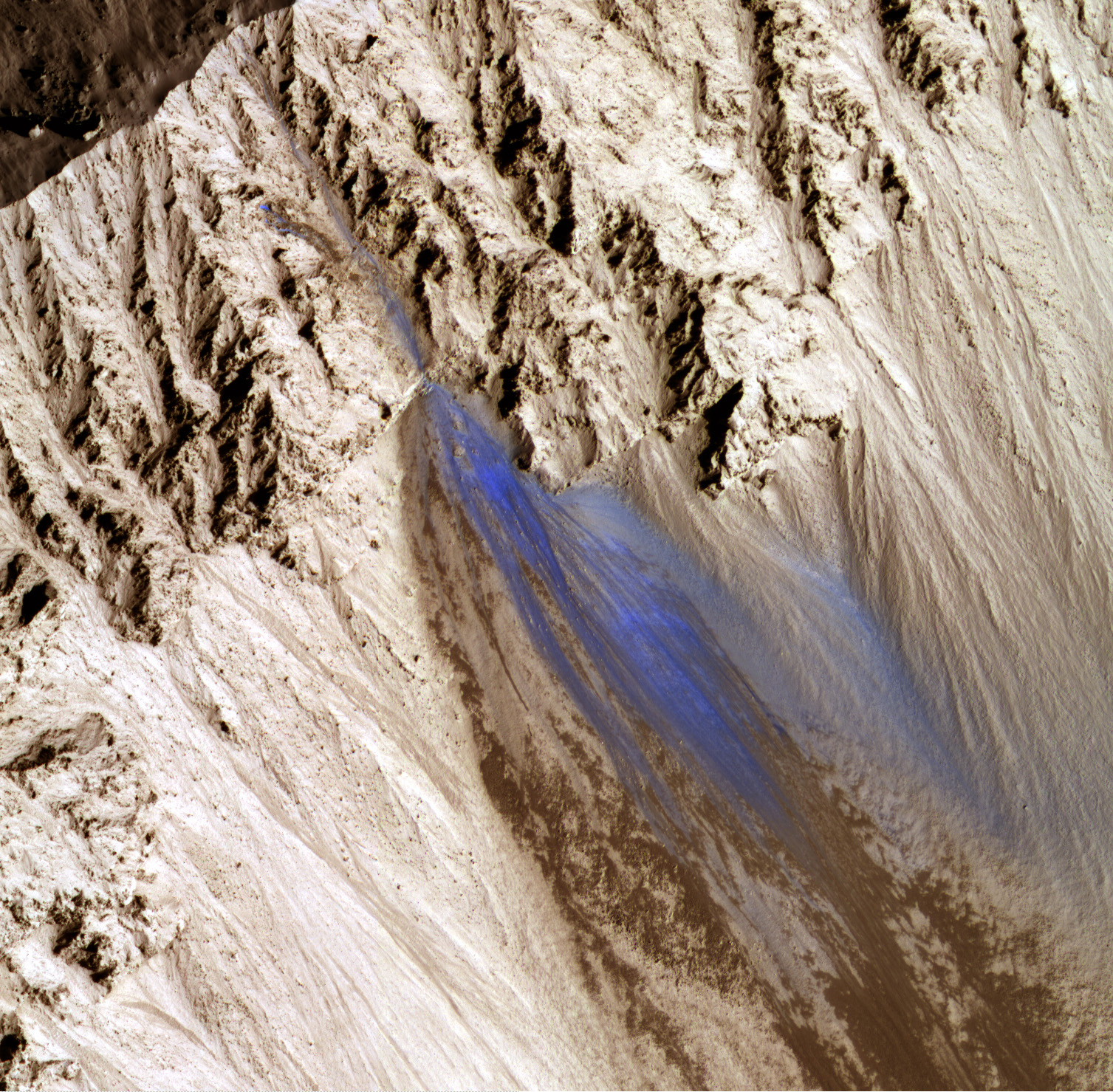
A landslide in the Martian crater Zunil.

The impact created a ray system, visible in the infrared, that extends up to 1,600 km (990 mi) from the crater and produced hundreds of millions of secondary craters with diameters ranging from 10 to 100 m (33 to 328 ft). Very few of these secondary craters lie within 80 km (50 mi) of Zunil. Around 80% of the craters in Athabasca Valles are Zunil secondaries. If similar impacts also produced comparable amounts of secondaries, this calls into question the accuracy of crater counting as a dating technique for geologically young Martian surface features.

A simulation of the Zunil impact ejected on the order of ten billion rock fragments greater than 10 centimetres (3.9 in) in diameter, the total ejecta comprising 30 km^{3} (7.2 cu mi). These formed about a billion secondary craters 10 m in size up to 3,500 km (2,200 mi) away from the primary impact. It is possible that some of these fragments from the impact made it to Earth to become shergottites, a form of Martian meteorite.

Research published in the journal Icarus has found pits in Zunil Crater that are caused by hot ejecta falling on ground containing ice. The pits are formed by heat forming steam that rushes out from groups of pits simultaneously, thereby blowing away from the pit ejecta.

== See also ==
- List of craters on Mars
- List of craters with ray systems
