= Philoxenus (crater) =

Crater on Mercury

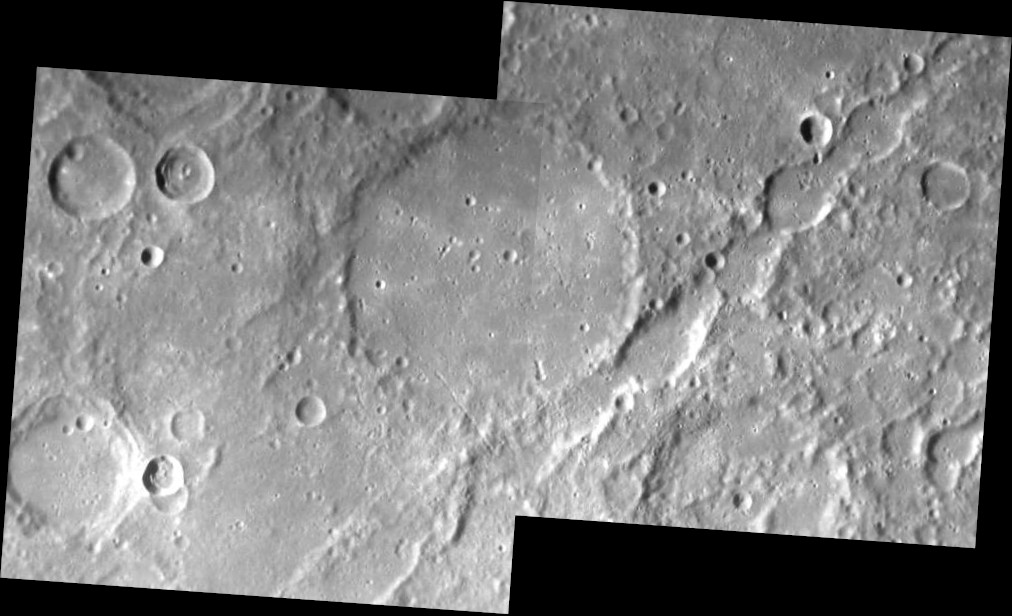
- MESSENGER NAC mosaic
- Planet: Mercury
- Coordinates: 8.68°S 111.75°W
- Quadrangle: Beethoven
- Diameter: 87 km (54 mi)
- Eponym: Philoxenus of Cythera

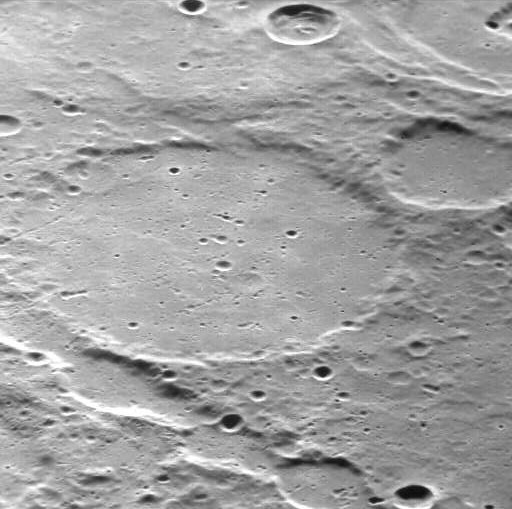
Oblique view

Philoxenus is a crater on Mercury. Its name was adopted by the International Astronomical Union (IAU) in 1976. Philoxenus is named for Greek lyric poet Philoxenus of Cythera.

A prominent but unnamed catena trends northeast from near the south rim of Philoxenus. The small crater Waters is east of Philoxenus.
