= David (crater) =

Crater on Mercury

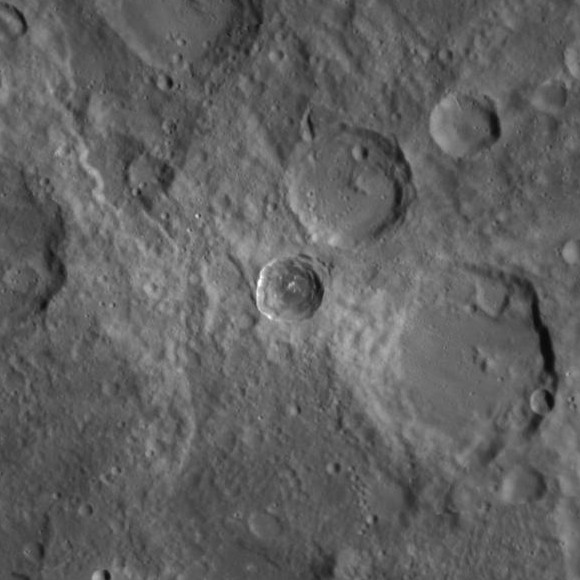
- MESSENGER WAC mosaic of David, center
- Feature type: Central-peak impact crater
- Location: Derain quadrangle, Mercury
- Coordinates: 17.66°S 292.13°W
- Diameter: 23 km (14 mi)
- Eponym: Jacques-Louis David

David is a small crater on Mercury, which has a bright ray system. Its name was adopted by the International Astronomical Union (IAU) in 2013. David is named for the French painter Jacques-Louis David.

The floor of David is a dark spot of low reflectance material (LRM), closely associated with hollows.

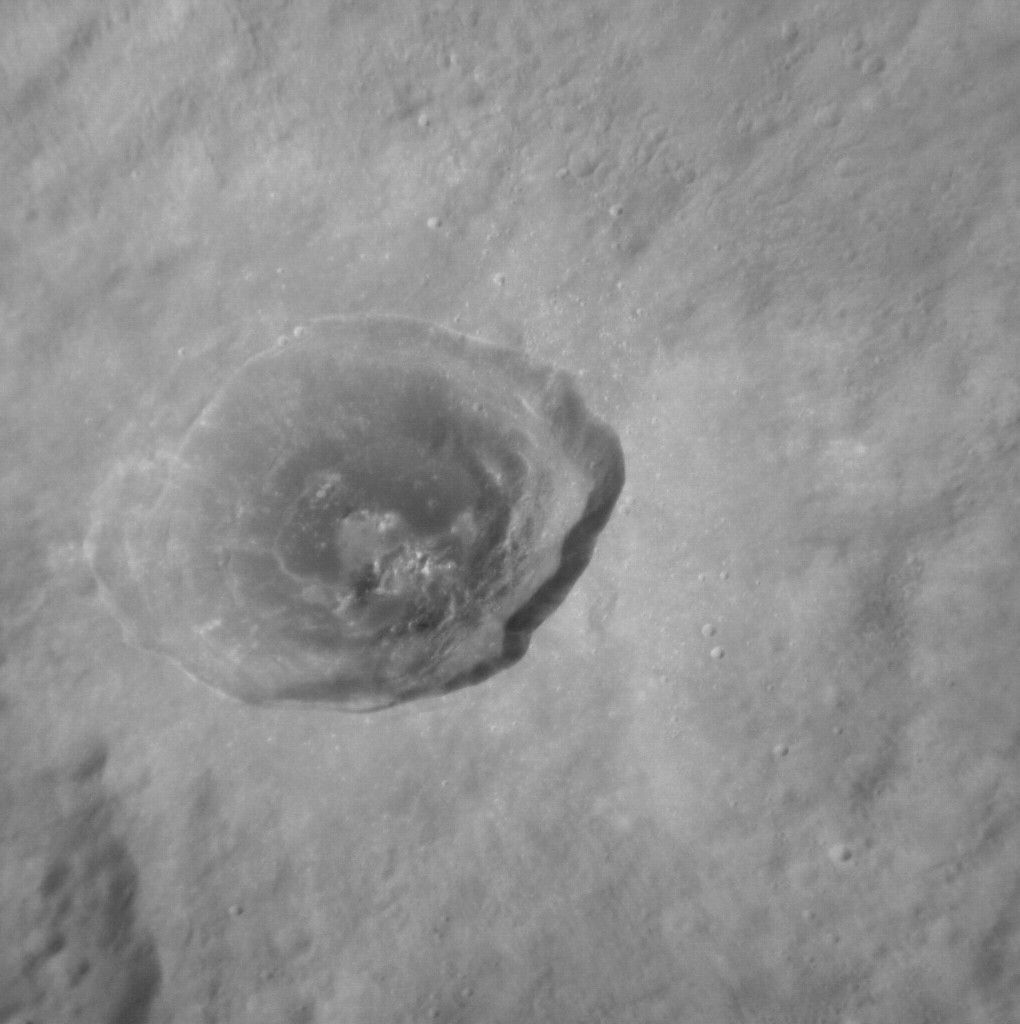
Oblique MESSENGER NAC image

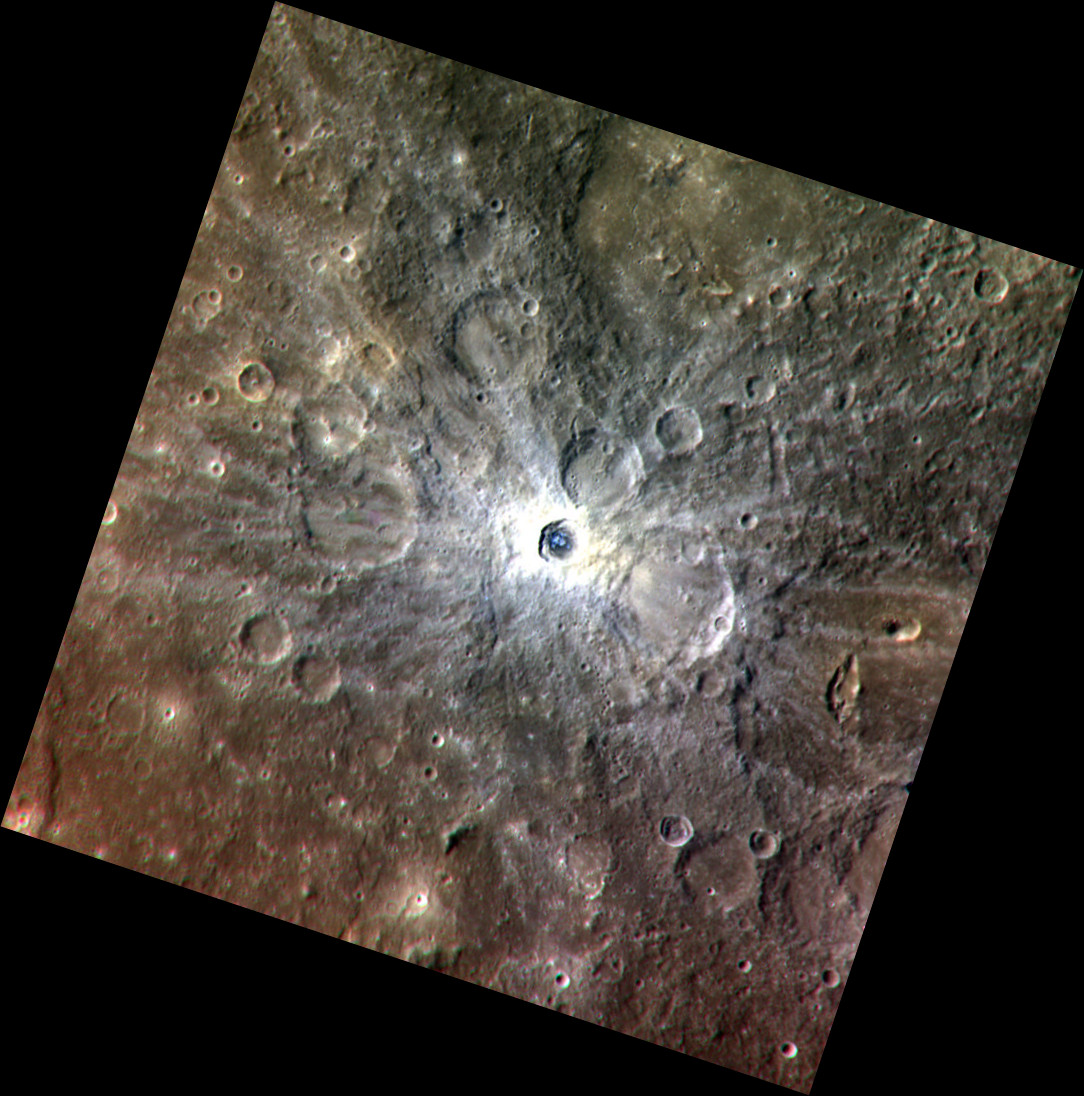
Exaggerated color image by MESSENGER
