= Juling (crater) =

Impact crater on Ceres

- An image of Juling from above
- Feature type: Impact crater
- Location: Ceres
- Coordinates: 35.90°S 168.48°E
- Diameter: 19–20 km
- Depth: 2.5 km
- Discoverer: Dawn
- Eponym: Orang Asli spirit

Juling is an impact crater on the dwarf planet and giant asteroid Ceres. About 19–20 km in diameter and 2.5 km deep, it lies near the crater Kupalo. It is named after the Orang Asli crops spirit in Malaysia. The International Astronomical Union adopted the name on 4 December 2015.

== Characteristics ==
Juling lies near the boundary between Ceres's equatorial and high-latitude regions at 35°S, 168°E. It lies about 20 km to the northeast of Kupalo, a larger neighboring crater. It is well-preserved and about 19–20 km in diameter and 2.5 km deep. Its crater walls have slopes up to 45° in the north, where Dawn's spectrometer detected exposed water ice. Rather than a central peak or ridge as would be expected for a crater of its size, Juling has a 16 km long structure that covers one-third of its crater floor. The rest of the floor has a hummocky texture, with furrows, boulders, and mounds. The structure has lobed edges and is connected to the crater wall in the west-northwest. It rises 800 m above the floor, and an irregular 1.5 km depression sits on its top. It may have been created from mass wasting on the northern wall. Juling is surrounded by concentric fractures beyond its rim and a bright ejecta blanket.

Juling formed within the last ~2.5 million years – only ~2 million years after Kupalo. Exposed water ice would have sublimated away within Juling's age, so it must have been exposed more recently. Dawn observations show that more water ice is exposed during winter.
