= Balmer (crater) =

Crater on the Moon

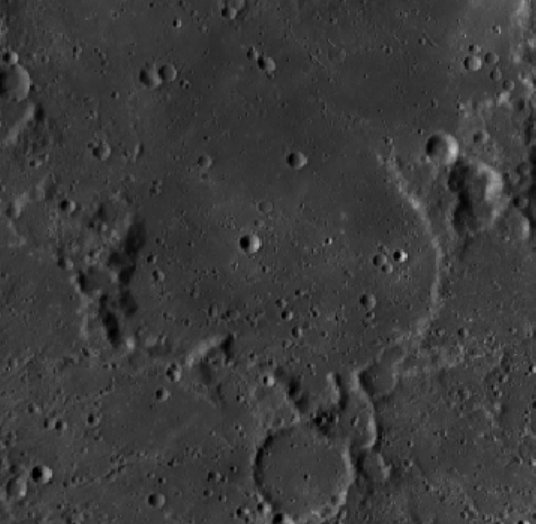
- LRO image
- Coordinates: 20.1°N 70.6°E
- Diameter: 136.30 km (84.69 mi)
- Colongitude: 288° at sunrise
- Formation: Pre-Nectarian
- Eponym: Johann J. Balmer

Balmer is the basalt-covered remains of a lunar impact feature. Only the heavily worn southern and eastern sections of the outer wall still survive; the remainder being overlaid by a basalt flow that joins to the nearby mare. It forms part of the larger structure called the Balmer-Kapteyn Basin. Balmer lies to the east-southeast of the crater Vendelinus.

Balmer was considered a Constellation program region of interest. Light plains deposits overlay mare basalt, as evidenced by multiple dark-halo craters. The surviving rims are from the pre-Nectarian period of the lunar geologic timescale.

This formation is named after the Swiss mathematician and physician Johann J. Balmer (1825–1898), who was known for his work on spectral series. The name was introduced into lunar nomenclature by David W. G. Arthur and Ewen Whitaker with the Rectified Lunar Atlas (1963). Its designation was formally adopted by the International Astronomical Union in 1964.

== Satellite craters ==
By convention these features are identified on lunar maps by placing the letter on the side of the crater midpoint that is closest to Balmer.

Balmer	Latitude	Longitude	Diameter
M	20.7° S	71.5° E	5 km
N	19.9° S	69.9° E	8 km
P	20.4° S	67.7° E	13 km
Q	18.7° S	70.5° E	7 km
R	18.7° S	69.1° E	4 km
S	18.4° S	67.6° E	6 km

== Gallery ==
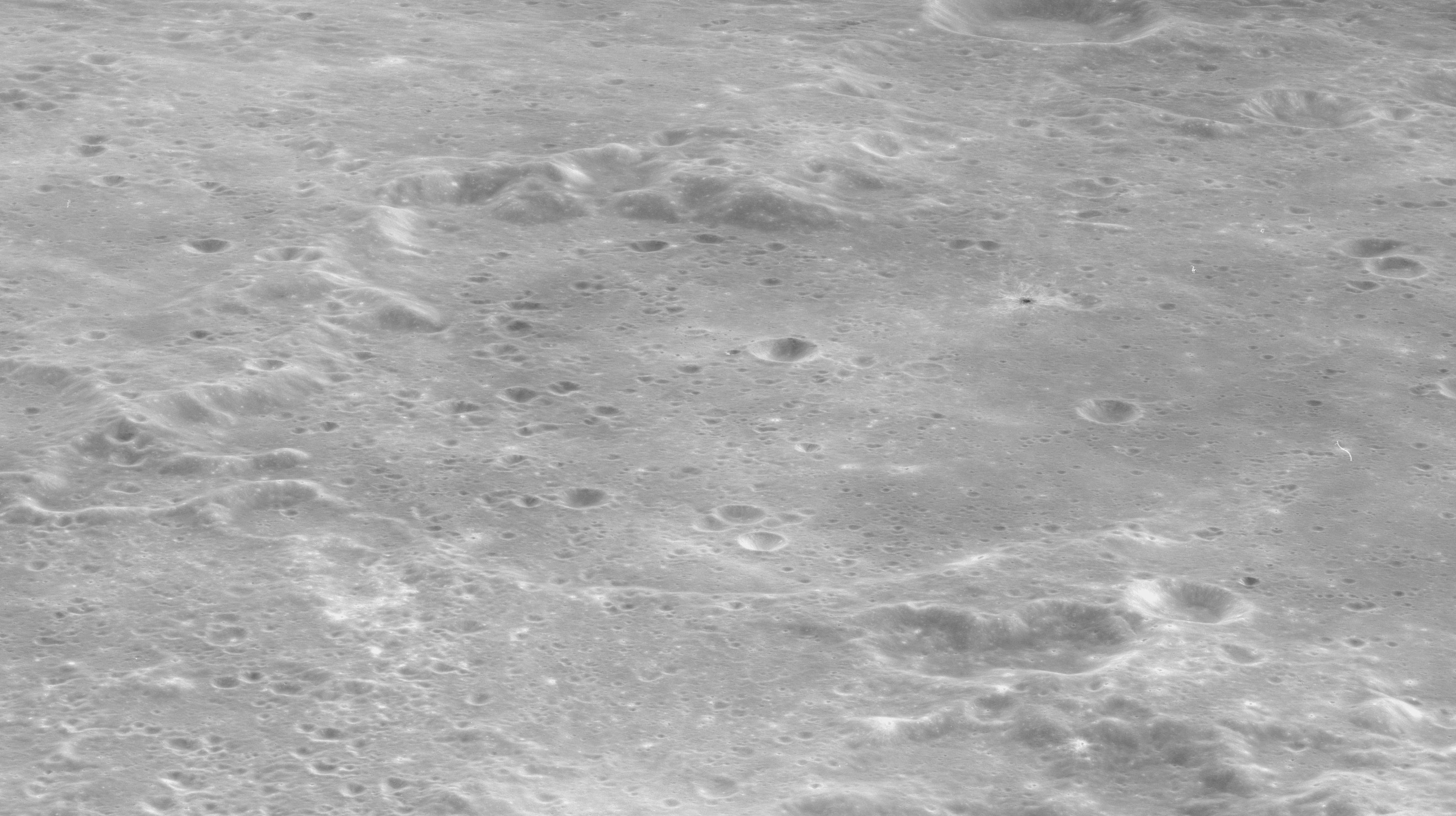
Oblique view facing west from Apollo 17

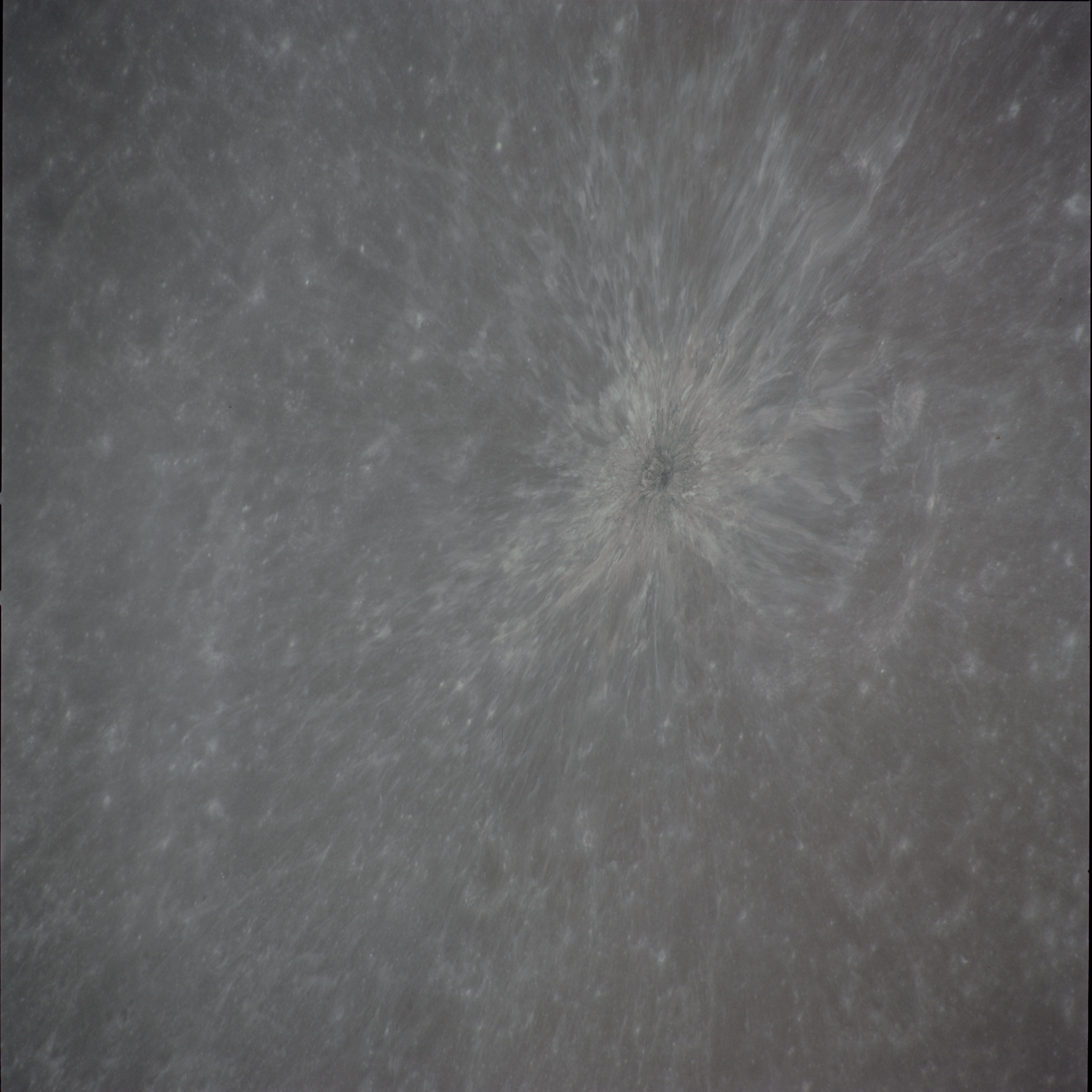
Within Balmer is this 1-km wide impact crater with a prominent ray system, photographed by Apollo 14

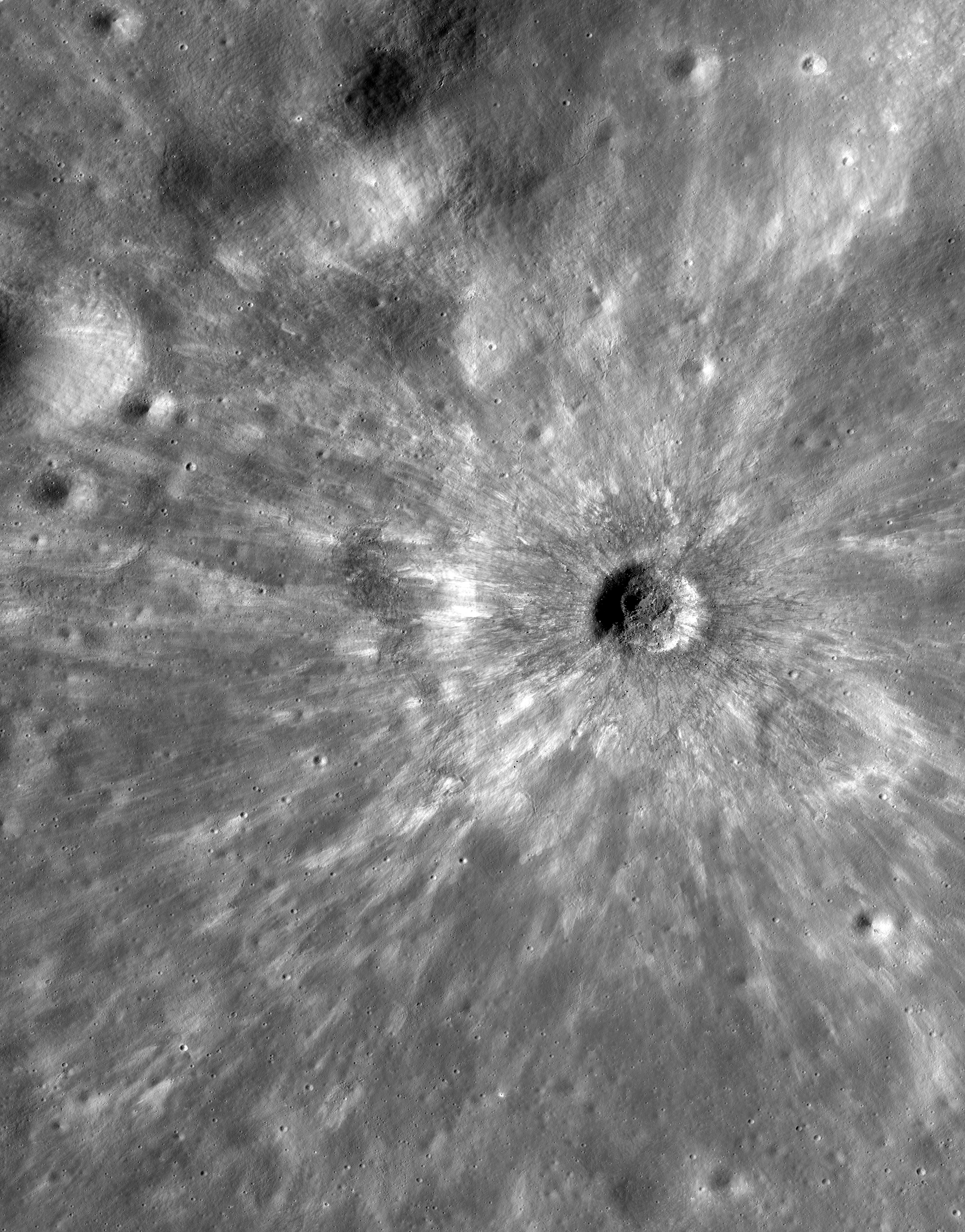
LRO image of the 1-km crater with rays within Balmer
