= Ives (crater) =

Crater on Mercury

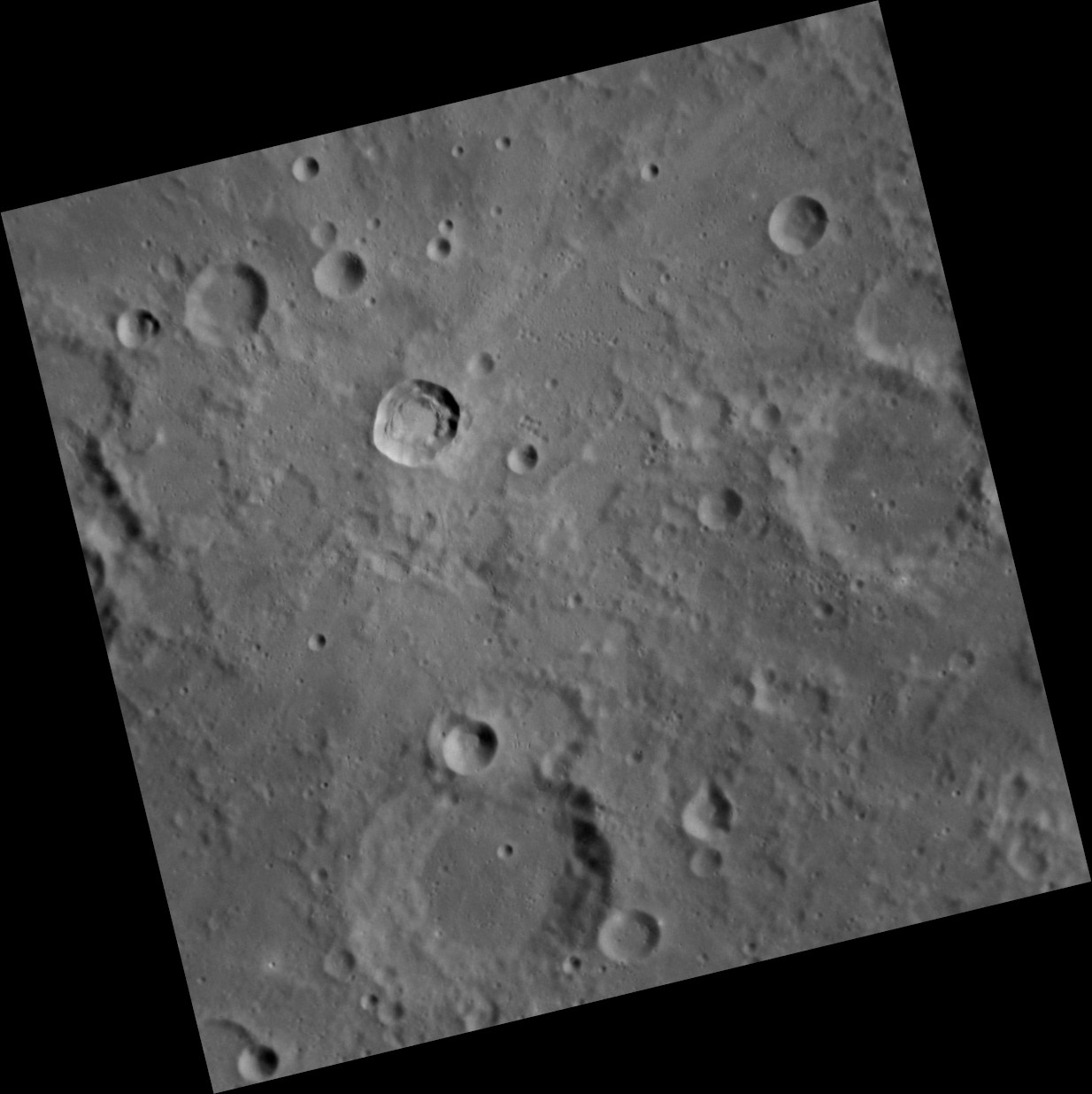
- MESSENGER NAC with Ives in upper left
- Feature type: Impact crater
- Location: Michelangelo quadrangle, Mercury
- Coordinates: 32.87°S 111.99°W
- Diameter: 18.0 km (11.2 mi)
- Eponym: Charles Ives

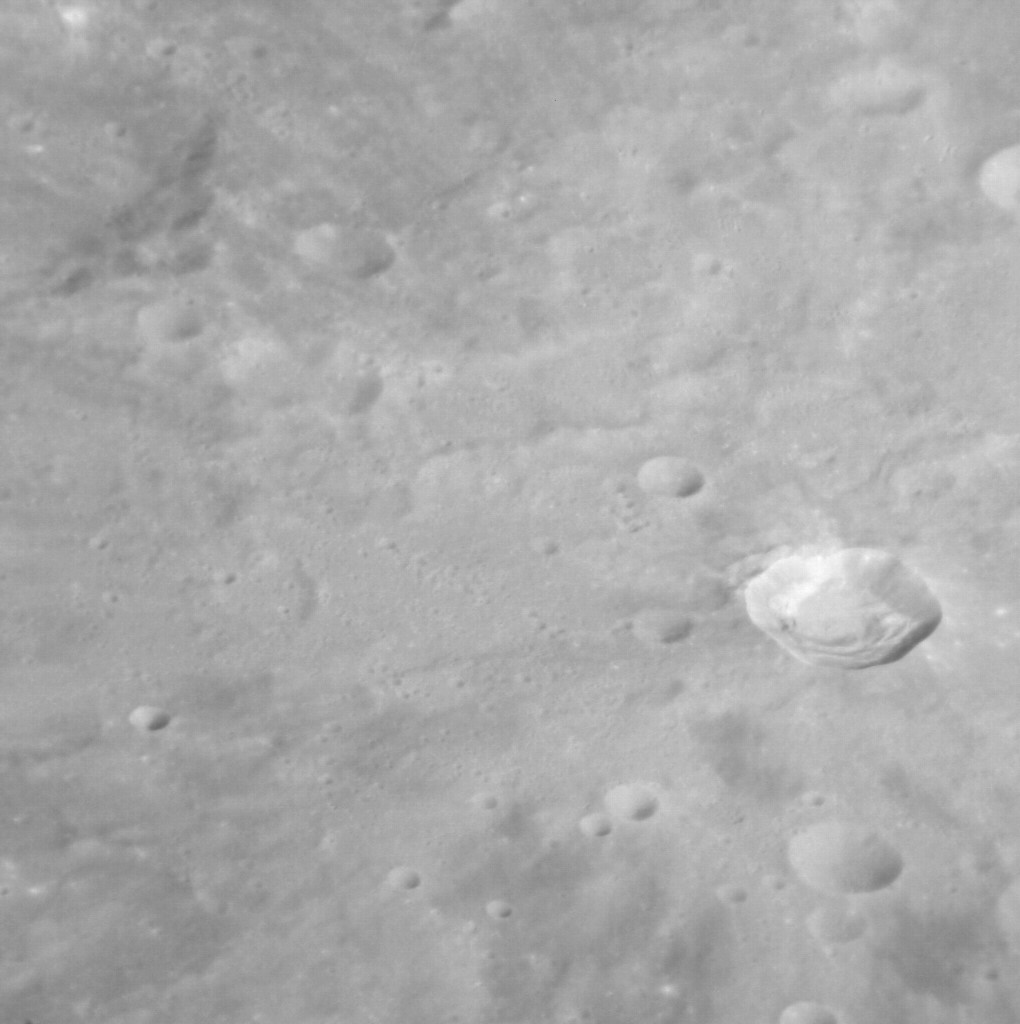
Ovlique view of Ives crater

Ives is a crater on Mercury. Its name was adopted by the International Astronomical Union (IAU) in 1979. Ives is named for the American composer Charles Ives, who lived from 1874 to 1954. The crater was first imaged by Mariner 10 in 1974.

Ives has a bright ray system.

Ives is northeast of Surikov crater and north of Michelangelo.
