= Dionysius (crater) =

Crater on the Moon

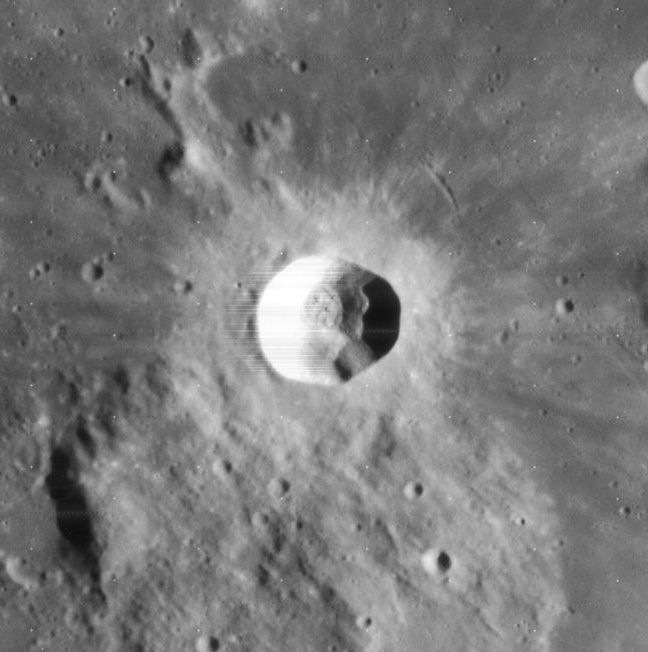
- Lunar Orbiter 4 image
- Coordinates: 2.8°N 17.3°E
- Diameter: 17.25 km (10.72 mi)
- Depth: 2.91 km (1.81 mi)
- Colongitude: 343° at sunrise
- Formation: Copernican
- Eponym: St. Dionysius

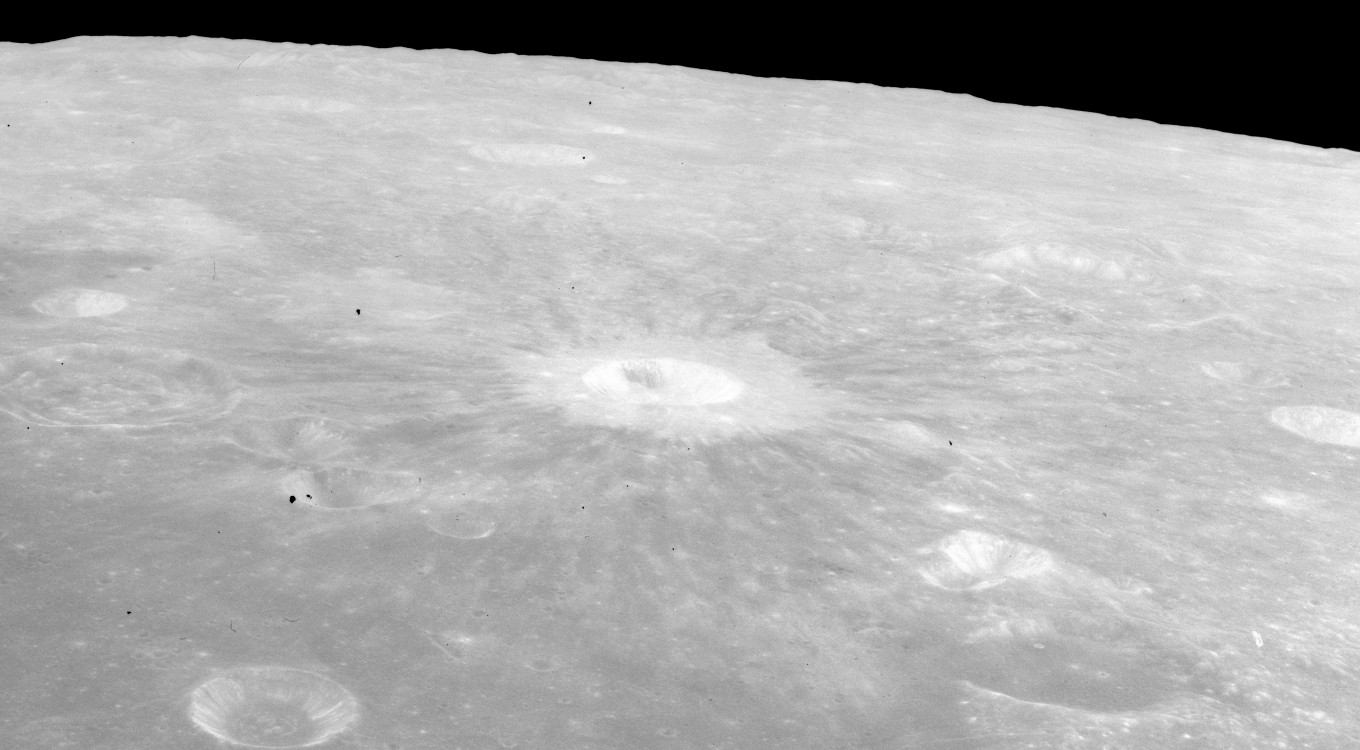
Oblique view from Apollo 15, showing the bright rays

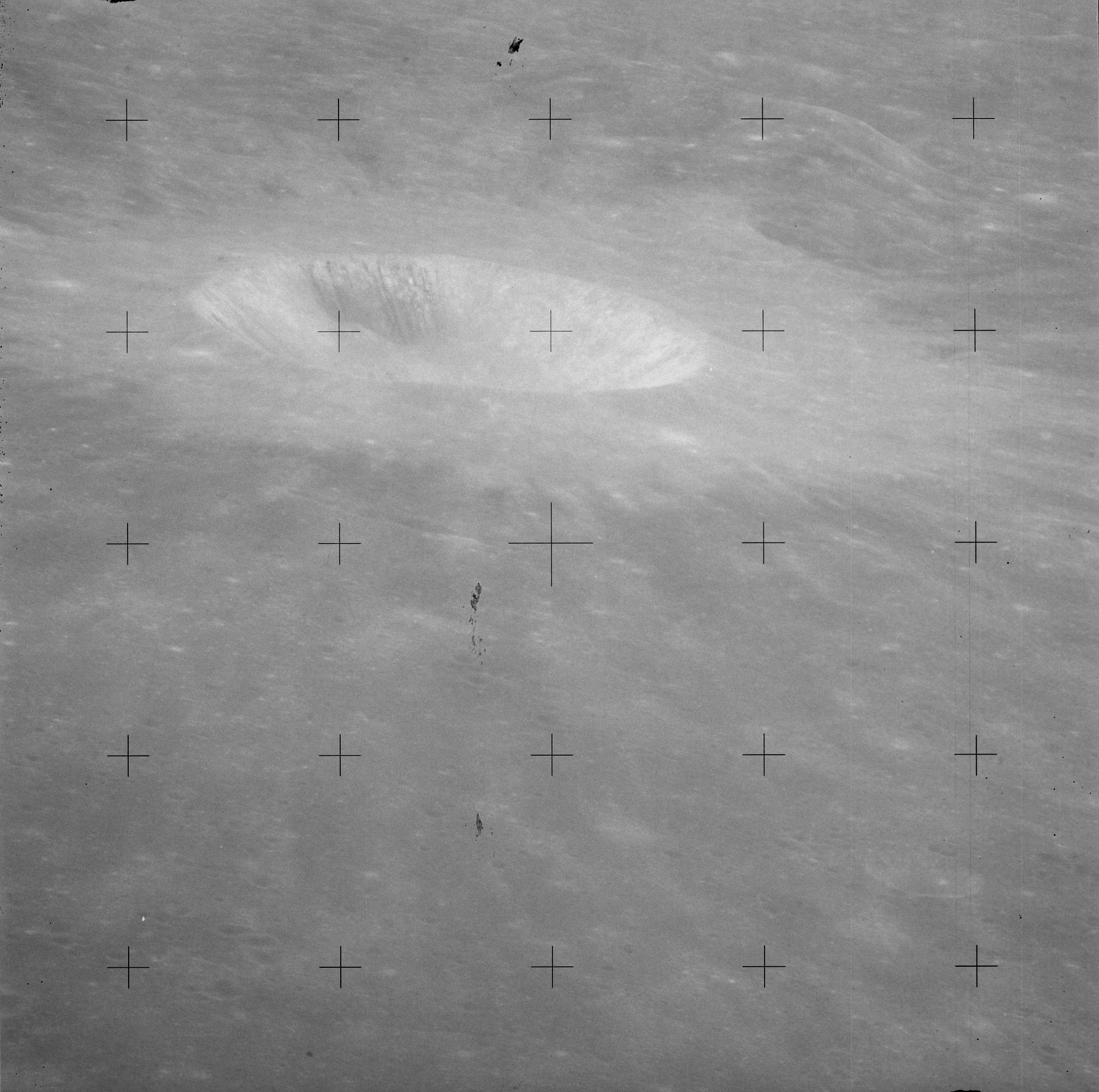
Another view from Apollo 15

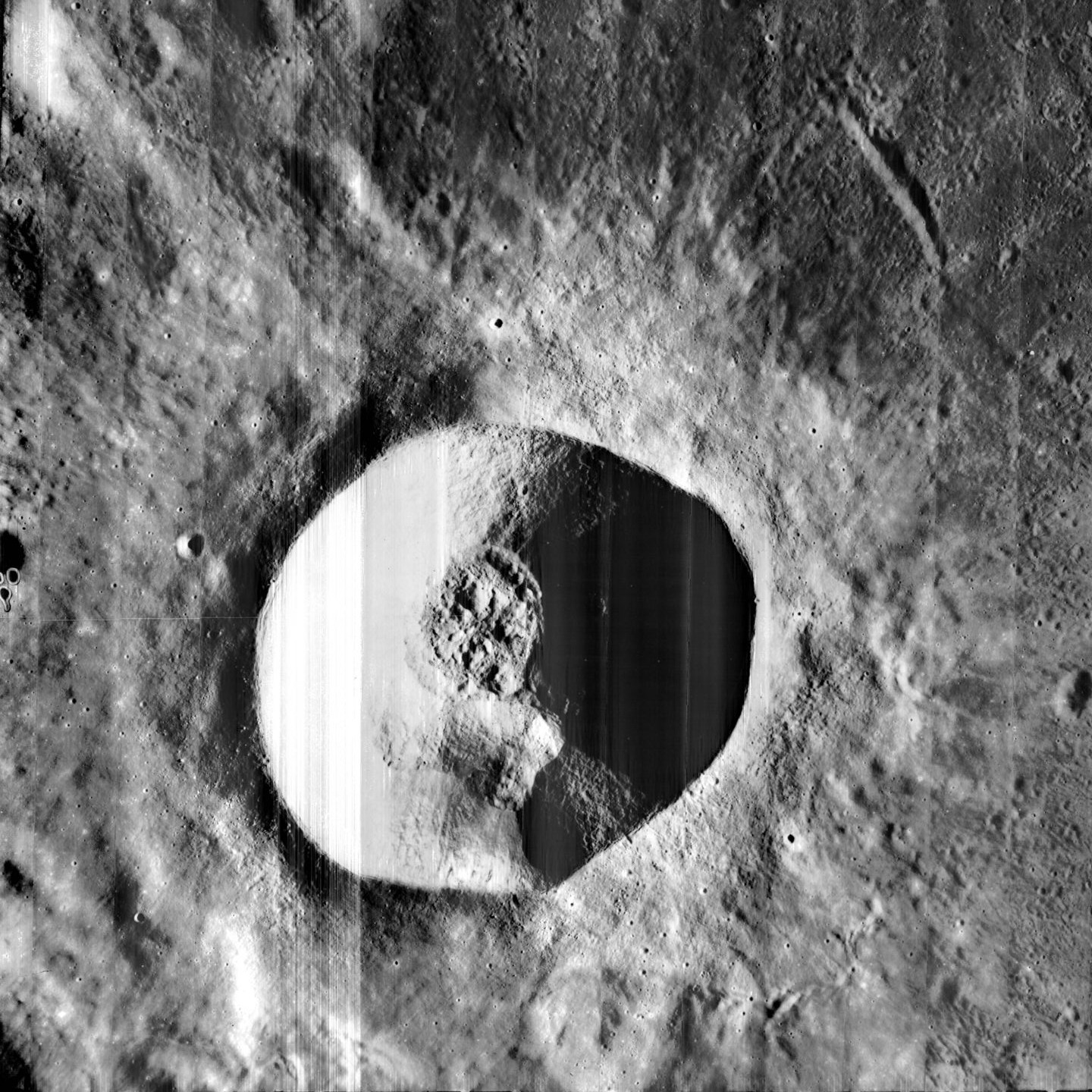
Detail of the interior from Lunar Orbiter 5

Dionysius is a lunar impact crater that lies on the western edge of the Mare Tranquillitatis. T. W. Webb called it a "very brilliant crater-ring". To the southeast is the crater pair of Ritter and Sabine. Just to the northwest is the system of rilles designated Rimae Ritter. These clefts follow a generally northwest direction.

The rim of Dionysius is generally circular and shows little sign of wear. The crater possesses a small ray system with a radius of over 130 kilometers. The formation has a high albedo and appears bright when the Sun is nearly overhead during a full Moon. It is surrounded by a bright halo, with darker material farther out. Some darker deposits are in the form of relatively rare dark rays.

This formation is named after the Greek astronomer Dionysius the Areopagite (fl. 1st century A.D.). In 1651, his name was included in the lunar nomenclature of Italian astronomer Giovanni B. Riccioli as S. Dionysius, but he assigned it to the crater now named Delambre. Its modern designation was officially adopted by the International Astronomical Union in 1935.

== Satellite craters ==
By convention these features are identified on lunar maps by placing the letter on the side of the crater midpoint that is closest to Dionysius.

Dionysius	Latitude	Longitude	Diameter
A	1.7° N	17.6° E	3 km
B	3.0° N	15.8° E	4 km
