= Kirch (crater) =

Crater on the Moon

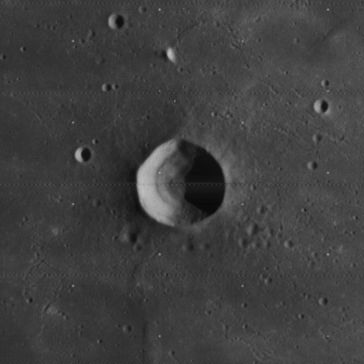
- Lunar Orbiter 4 image
- Coordinates: 39.2°N 5.6°W
- Diameter: 11 km
- Depth: 1.8 km
- Colongitude: 6° at sunrise
- Formation: Eratosthenian
- Eponym: Gottfried Kirch

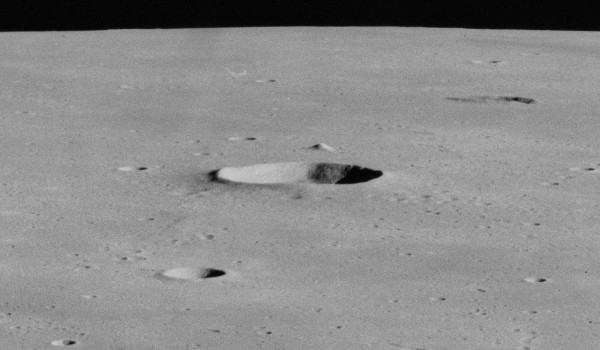
Oblique view from Apollo 15

Kirch is a small lunar impact crater in the eastern part of the Mare Imbrium, a large lunar mare in the northwest quadrant of the Moon. It was named after German astronomer Gottfried Kirch. This is a relatively solitary formation with the nearest comparable crater being Piazzi Smyth to the northeast. Notable features in the vicinity are the Montes Spitzbergen mountains to the south and the solitary peak Mons Piton to the east-northeast. Kirch is circular and bowl-shaped, with a dark interior having the same albedo as the surrounding terrain.

== Satellite craters ==
By convention these features are identified on lunar maps by placing the letter on the side of the crater midpoint that is closest to Kirch.

Kirch	Latitude	Longitude	Diameter
E	36.5° N	6.9° W	3 km
F	38.0° N	6.0° W	4 km
G	37.4° N	8.1° W	3 km
H	39.0° N	7.0° W	3 km
K	39.2° N	4.0° W	3 km
M	39.5° N	9.9° W	3 km
