= Secondary crater =

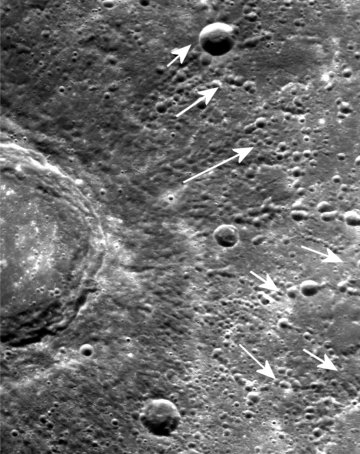
MESSENGER image of secondary craters surrounding a primary impact site.

Secondary craters are impact craters formed by the ejecta that was thrown out of a larger crater. They sometimes form radial crater chains. In addition, secondary craters are often seen as clusters or rays surrounding primary craters. The study of secondary craters exploded around the mid-twentieth century when researchers studying surface craters to predict the age of planetary bodies realized that secondary craters contaminated the crater statistics of a body's crater count.

== Formation ==
When a velocity-driven extraterrestrial object impacts a relatively stationary body, an impact crater forms. Initial crater(s) to form from the collision are known as primary craters or impact craters. Material expelled from primary craters may form secondary craters (secondaries) under a few conditions:

1. Primary craters must already be present.
2. The gravitational acceleration of the extraterrestrial body must be great enough to drive the ejected material back toward the surface.
3. The velocity by which the ejected material returns toward the body's surface must be large enough to form a crater.

If ejected material is within an atmosphere, such as on Earth, Venus, or Titan, then it is more difficult to retain high enough velocity to create secondary impacts. Likewise, bodies with higher resurfacing rates, such as Io, also do not record surface cratering.

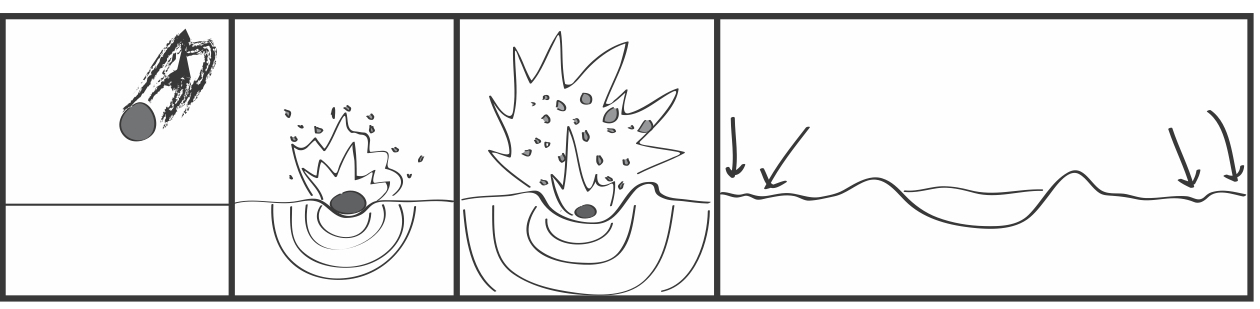
Cartoon strip of the formation of impact craters and, subsequently, secondary craters. From left to right, shows the timeline of a mass impacting a body, ejecta propagating from the initial impact, shock wave motion and the resulting cratered surface. The right most rectangle features arrows, which express the location at which secondary craters will form outside of or away from the impact center.

=== Self-secondary crater ===
Self-secondary craters are a those that form from ejected material of a primary crater but that are ejected at such an angle that the ejected material makes an impact within the primary crater itself. Self-secondary craters have caused much controversy with scientists who excavate cratered surfaces with the intent to identify its age based on the composition and melt material. An observed feature on Tycho has been interpreted to be a self-secondary crater morphology known as palimpsests.

== Appearance ==
Secondary craters are formed around primary craters. When a primary crater forms following a surface impact, the shock waves from the impact will cause the surface area around the impact circle to stress, forming a circular outer ridge around the impact circle. Ejecta from this initial impact is thrust upward out of the impact circle at an angle toward the surrounding area of the impact ridge. This ejecta blanket, or broad area of impacts from the ejected material, surrounds the crater.

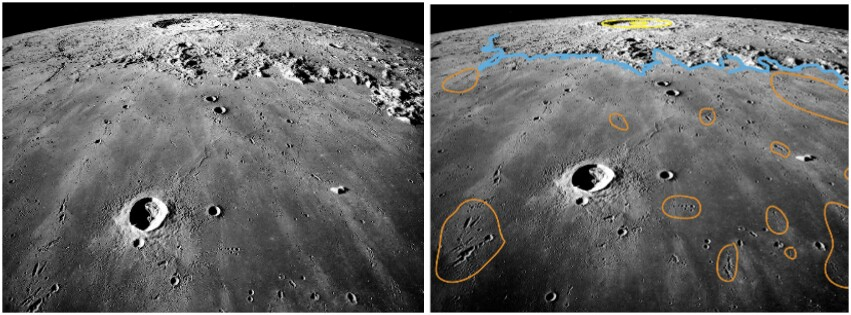
From the impact that formed Copernicus (upper center, yellow), ejecta blanketed the surrounding area. Blue denotes the outline of the ejecta deposit; secondary craters and crater chains are orange.

=== Chains and clusters ===
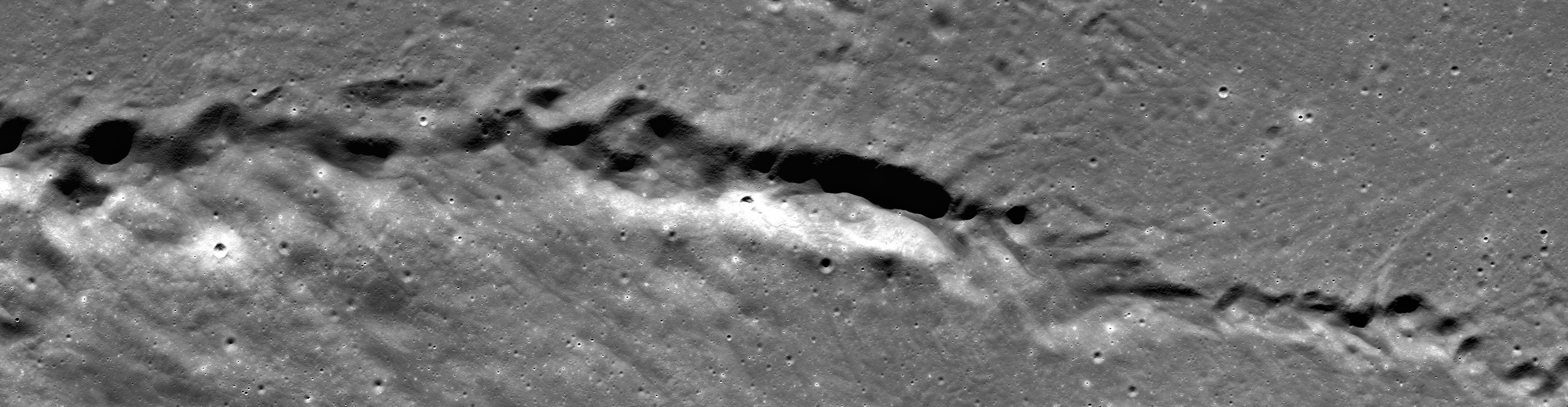
Secondary crater chain of Copernicus in Mare Imbrium

Secondary craters may appear as small-scaled singular craters similar to a primary crater with a smaller radius, or as chains and clusters. A secondary crater chain is simply a row or chain of secondary craters lined adjacent to one another. Likewise, a cluster is a population of secondaries near to one another.

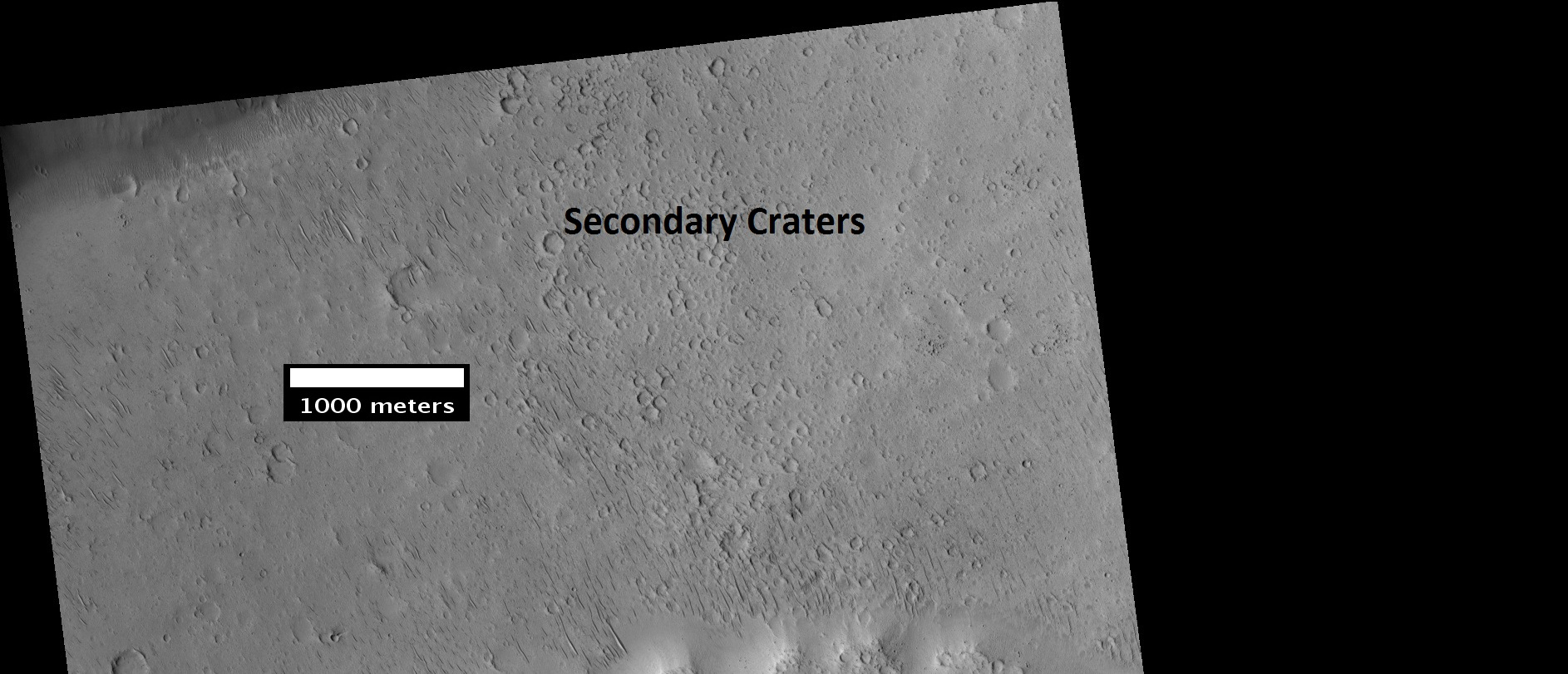
Group of secondary craters on Mars, as seen by HiRISE

== Distinguishing factors of primary and secondary craters ==
=== Impact energy ===
Primary craters form from high-velocity impacts whose foundational shock waves must exceed the speed of sound in the target material. Secondary craters occur at lower impact velocities. However, they must still occur at high enough speeds to deliver stress to the target body and produce strain results that exceed the limits of elasticity, that is, secondary projectiles must break the surface.

It can be increasing difficult to distinguish primary craters from secondaries craters when the projectile fractures and breaks apart prior to impact. This depends on conditions in the atmosphere, coupled with projectile velocity and composition. For instance, a projectile that strikes the moon will probably hit intact; whereas if it strikes the earth, it will be slowed and heated by atmospheric entry, possibly breaking up. In that case, the smaller chunks, now separated from the large impacting body, may impact the surface of the planet in the region outside the primary crater, which is where many secondary craters appear following primary surface impact.

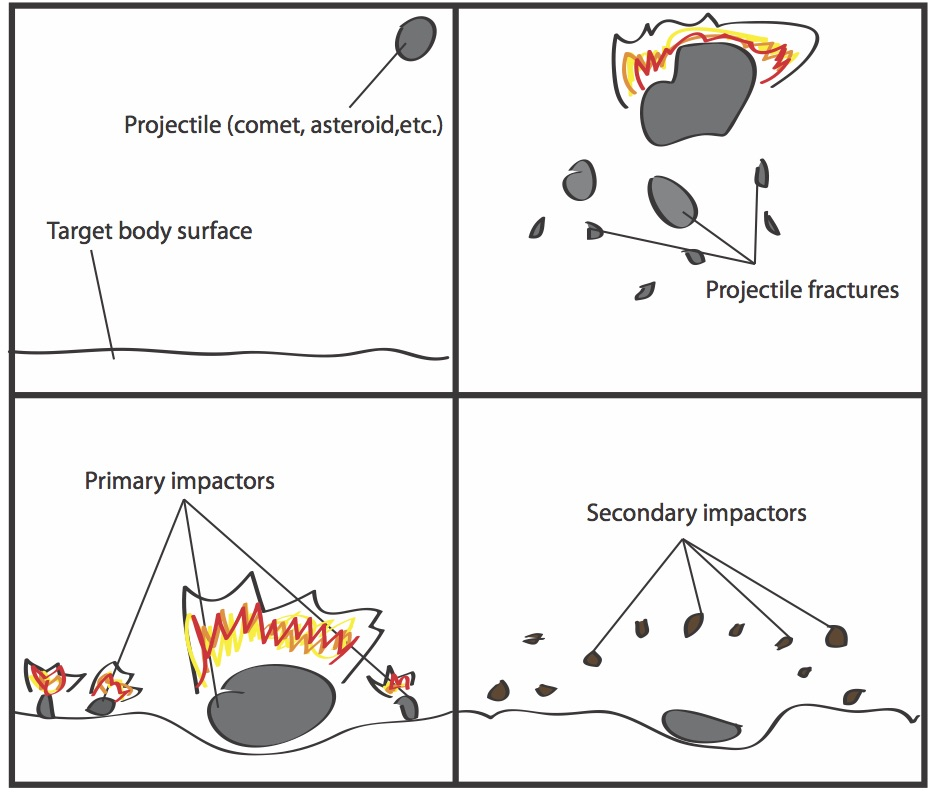
Illustration of projectile fracturing prior to primary impact to show the chronological procedure of the creation of primary and secondary impacts from projectile fractures.

=== Impact angle ===
For primary impacts, based on geometry, the most probable impact angle is 45° between two objects, and the distribution falls off rapidly outside of the range 30° – 60°. It is observed that impact angle has little effect on the shape of primary craters, except in the case of low angle impacts, where the resulting crater shape becomes less circular and more elliptical. The primary impact angle is much more influential on the morphology (shape) of secondary impacts. Experiments conducted from lunar craters suggests that the ejection angle is at its highest for the early-stage ejecta, that which is ejected from the primary impact at its earliest moments, and that the ejection angle decreases with time for the late-stage ejecta. For example, a primary impact that is vertical to the body surface may produce early-stage ejection angles of 60°-70°, and late-stage ejection angles that have decreases to nearly 30°.

=== Target type ===
Mechanical properties of a target's regolith (existing loose rocks) will influence the angle and velocity of ejecta from primary impacts. Research using simulations has been conducted that suggest that a target body's regolith decreases the velocity of ejecta. Secondary crater sizes and morphology also are affected by the distribution of rock sizes in the regolith of the target body.

=== Projectile type ===
The calculation of depth of secondary crater can be formulated based on the target body's density. Studies of the Nördlinger Ries in Germany and of ejecta blocks circling lunar and martian crater rims suggest that ejecta fragments having a similar density would likely express the same depth of penetration, as opposed to ejecta of differing densities creating impacts of varying depths, such as primary impactors, i.e. comets and asteroids.

=== Size and Morphology ===
Secondary crater size is dictated by the size of its parent primary crater. Primary craters can vary from microscopic to thousands of kilometers wide. The morphology of primary craters ranges from bowl-shaped to large, wide basins, where multi-ringed structures are observed. Two factors dominate the morphologies of these craters: material strength and gravity. The bowl-shaped morphology suggests that the topography is supported by the strength of the material, while the topography of the basin-shaped craters is overcome by gravitational forces and collapses toward flatness. The morphology, and size, of secondary craters is limited. Secondary craters exhibit a maximum diameter of < 5% of its parent primary crater. The size of a secondary crater is also dependent on its distance from its primary. The morphology of secondaries is simple but distinctive. Secondaries that form closer to their primaries appear more elliptical with shallower depths. These may form rays or crater chains. The more distant secondaries appear similar in circularity to their parent primaries, but these are often seen in an array of clusters.

== Age constraints due to secondary craters ==
Scientists have long been collecting data surrounding impact craters from the observation that craters are present all throughout the span of the Solar System. Most notably, impact craters are studied for the purposes of estimating ages, both relative and absolute, of planetary surfaces. Dating terrains on planets from the according to density of craters has developed into a thorough technique, however 3 key assumptions control it:

1. craters exist as independently, contingent occurrences.
2. size frequency distribution (SFD) of primary craters is known.
3. cratering rate relative to time is known.

Photographs taken from notable lunar and martian missions have provided scientists the ability to count and log the number of observed craters on each body. These crater count databases are further sorted according to each craters size, depth, morphology, and location. The observations and characteristics of both primaries and secondaries are used in distinguishing impact craters within small crater cluster, which are characterized as clusters of craters with a diameter ≤1 km. Unfortunately, age research stemming from these crater databases is restrained due to the pollution of secondary craters. Scientists are finding it difficult to sort out all the secondary craters from the count, as they present false assurance of statistical vigor. Contamination by secondaries is often misused to calculate age constraints due to the erroneous attempts of using small craters to date small surface areas.

== Occurrence ==
Secondary craters are common on rocky bodies in the Solar System with no or thin atmospheres, such as the Moon and Mars, but rare on objects with thick atmospheres such as Earth or Venus. However, in a study published in the Geological Society of America Bulletin the authors describe a field of secondary impact craters they believe was formed by the material ejected from a larger, primary meteor impact around 280 million years ago. The location of the primary crater is believed to be somewhere between Goshen and Laramie counties in Wyoming and Banner, Cheyenne, and Kimball counties in Nebraska.
