= Crater counting =

Method for estimating the age of a planet's surface

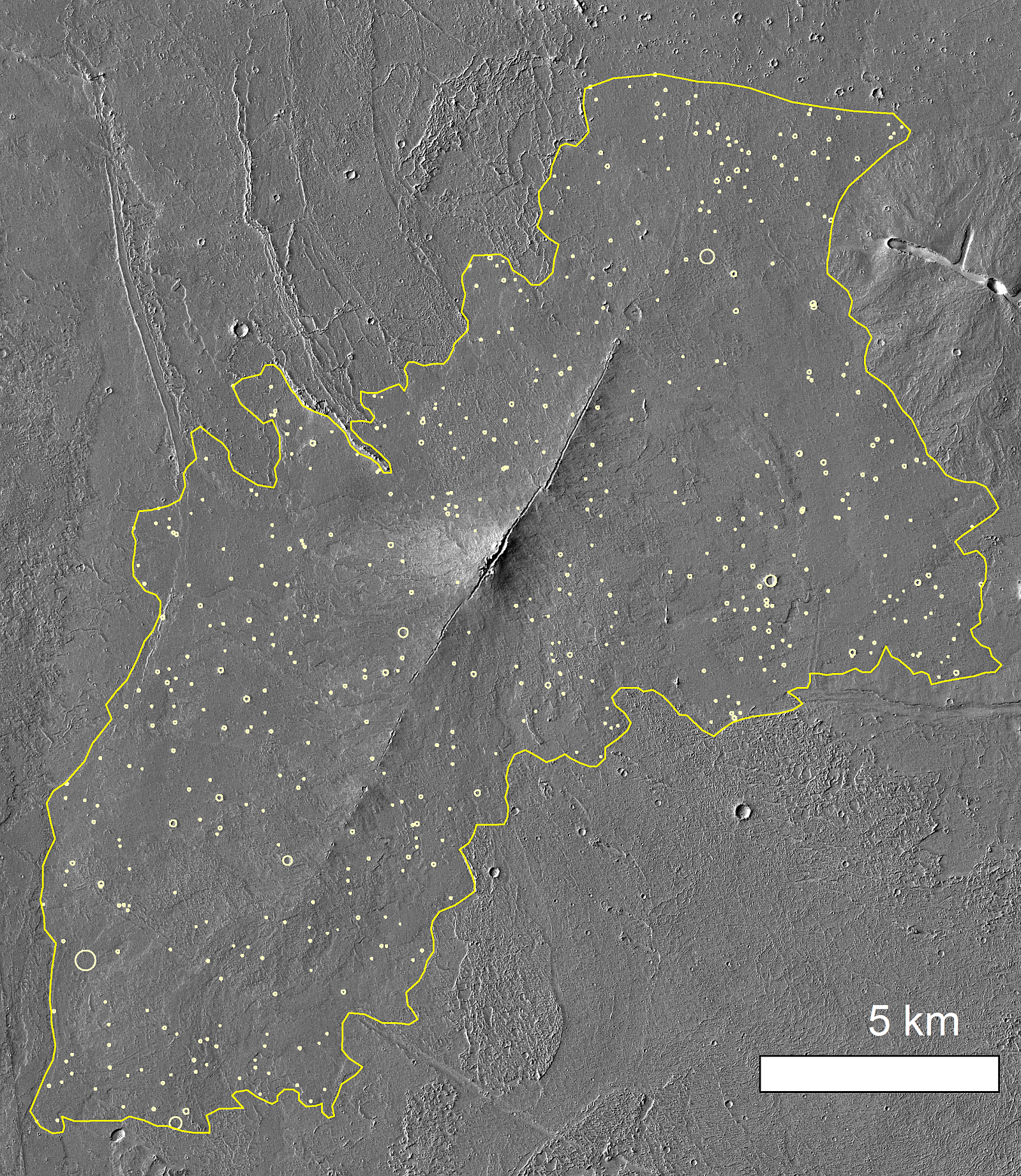
Shield volcano in Tharsis region on Mars with marked borders, circles represent impact craters counted by crater counting method.

Crater counting is a method for estimating the age of a planet or moon's surface based upon the assumptions that when a piece of planetary surface is new, then it has no impact craters; impact craters accumulate after that at a rate that is assumed known. Consequently, counting how many craters of various sizes there are in a given area allows determining how long they have accumulated and, consequently, how long ago the surface has formed. The method has been calibrated using the ages obtained by radiometric dating of samples returned from the Moon by the Luna and Apollo missions. It has been used to estimate the age of areas on Mars and other planets that were covered by lava flows, on the Moon of areas covered by giant mares, and how long ago areas on the icy moons of Jupiter and Saturn flooded with new ice.

== Crater counting and secondary craters ==
The crater counting method requires the presence of independent craters. Independent craters represent the primary impact point on a planets surface, while secondary craters represent the second impact on the surface of a planet. Secondary craters ('secondaries') are craters formed by material excavated by a primary impact that falls back to the surface seconds or minutes later. A way to distinguish primary and secondary craters is to consider their geometric arrangement; for example, large craters often have rays of secondary craters. Secondaries can sometimes also be recognized by their particular shape different from primary craters; this is due to the fact that the excavated material is slower and impacts at a lower angle than asteroids that arrive from space to create the primary crater.

The accuracy of age estimates of geologically young surfaces based on crater counting on Mars has been questioned due to formation of large amounts of secondary craters. In one case, the impact that created Zunil crater produced about a hundred secondary craters, some more than 1000 km from the primary impact. If similar impacts also produced comparable amounts of secondaries, it would mean a particular crater-free area of Mars had not been "splattered by a large, infrequent primary crater", as opposed to suffering relatively few small primary impacts since its formation. High speed ejecta generated from independent craters generates secondary craters which can resemble independent craters as well, contaminating counting processes as the secondary craters appear more circular and less cluttered than typical secondaries. Secondaries will inevitably contaminate independent crater counts leading to some who may question its effectiveness (see criticism heading for further information).

== History ==
The earliest scientist to study and produce a paper using crater counting as an age indicator was Ernst Öpik, an Estonian astronomer and astrophysicist. Ernst Öpik utilized the crater counting method to date the Moon's Mare Imbrium to be approximately 4.5 billion years of age, estimating the maria to be about 1000 years younger than the contintentes. The method was also utilized by Gene Shoemaker and Robert Baldwin, and further improved by Bill Hartman. Hartman's work includes dating the Lunar Mare to be approximately 3.6 billion years old, an age that was in accordance with isotopic samples. In later years, Gerhard Neukum advanced the method by proposing a stable impacting population over the period of 4 billion years due to unchanged shape of crater size-frequency distribution. More recent work has seen the transition from Lunar surface to Martian surface cratering, including work done by Neukum and Hartman. Within the past ten years, the Buffered Crater Counting approach has been used to date geologic formations. The calibration provided by the Lunar samples brought back during the six Apollo missions between 1969 and 1972 has remained invaluable to further refining and advancing the crater counting method to this day, but new work is being done to computerize the crater counting technique using Crater Detection Algorithms which uses high resolution imagery to detect small impact craters.

== Criticism ==
While crater counting has been refined in past years to be an accurate method of determining surface age of a planet despite a lack of isotopic samples, there is dissension in the planetary scientific community concerning the acceptance of crater counting as a precise and accurate form of geochronology. Shallow surface mechanism such as aeolian deposition, erosion, and diffusional creep can also alter crater morphology, making the surface appear younger than it truly is. Planets heavily covered by water or dense atmosphere would also impede the accuracy of this method, since observational efforts would be hampered. Planets with dense atmospheres will also cause incoming meteors to burn up due to friction before impacting the surface of the planet. The Earth is bombarded with approximately 100 tons of space dust, sand, and pebble particles every day; however, most of this material burns up in the atmosphere before ever reaching the surface of the planet. This is common for space material that is smaller than 25 meters, burning up due to friction in the atmosphere. While resulting observational values dating the Lunar surface from Hartman and Öpik do illustrate ages that correspond to isotopic data, they are potentially hampered by observational bias and human error. New advances continue to improve upon the original method.

== Application ==
Below is a list of studies which utilize or concern crater counting:

- Dating very young planetary surfaces from crater statistics: A review of issues and challenges
  - Using small craters for age analysis and the challenges and limitations associated such as illumination and imagery issues, crater modification (such as resurfacing), and impact rates.
- Comparison of different crater counting methods applicated to Parana Valles
  - Testing the reliability of the crater counting method using Parana Valles and comparing results to other methods using fine scale age determination of small diameter craters. Results conclude that the buffered crater counting method is more reliable in large areas than the basin method.
- Crater size-frequency measurements on linear features buffered crater counting in ArcGIS
  - Buffered crater counting analysis using the CraterTools software in ArcGIS. This tool allows for accurate data collection in areas which might have poor image quality or limited area of measurement.
- Crater counting lab exercise
  - Teaching exercise which allows for age determination of Lunar surface taken from Apollo mission images and extend this practiced method to Mars and Earth.
- The Importance of Secondary Cratering to Age Constraints on Planetary Surfaces
  - Discusses small craters caused by interplanetary debris in comparison to secondary craters formed by ejecta of primary impact. Results indicate that small craters can provide meaningful data to aid in age determination.

== See also ==
- Impact Field Studies Group
- Secondary Crater
- Geochronology
- Apollo Missions
- Meteorites
- Glossary of Meteoritics
- Age of Solar System
