= Waters (crater) =

Crater on Mercury

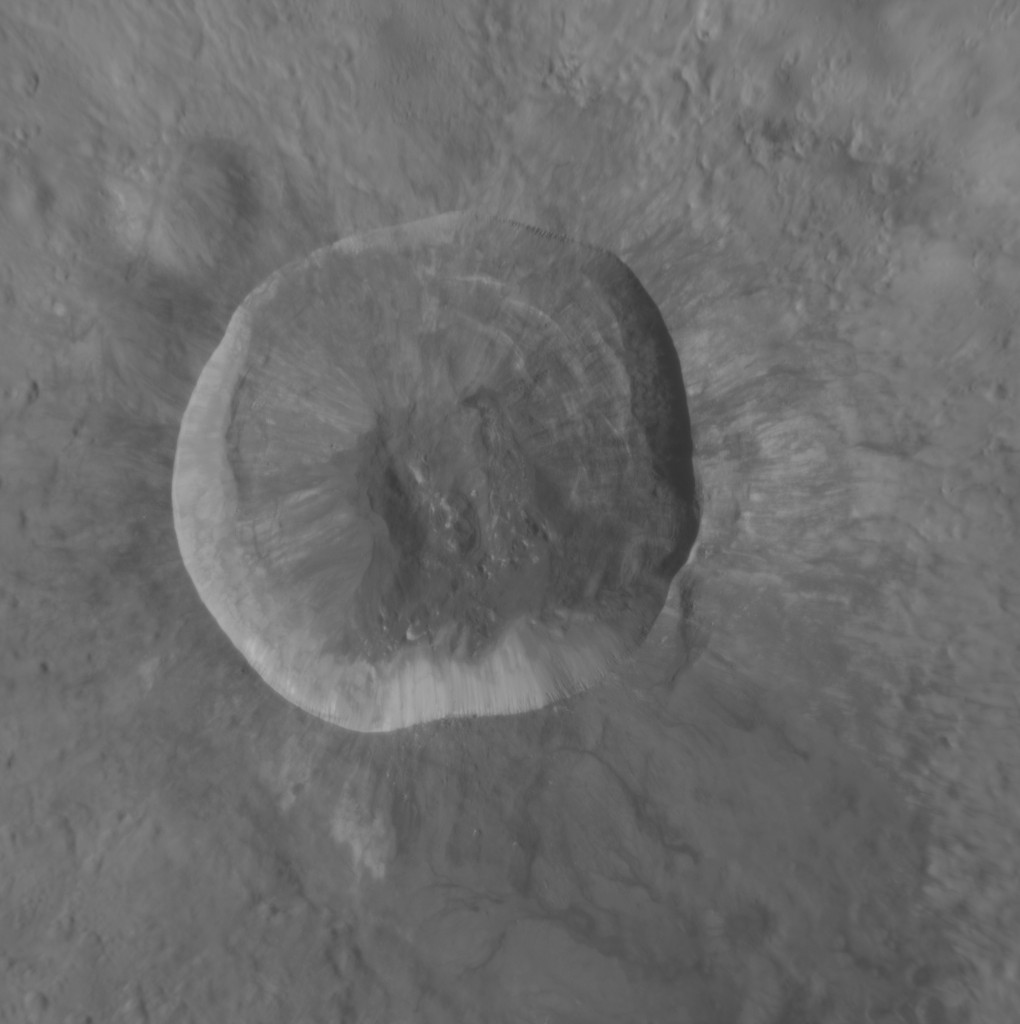
- MESSENGER NAC
- Planet: Mercury
- Coordinates: 8.96°S 105.45°W
- Quadrangle: Beethoven
- Diameter: 15 km (9.3 mi)
- Eponym: Muddy Waters

Waters is a crater on Mercury. Its name was adopted by the IAU in 2012, after the American musician McKinley Morganfield, better known as Muddy Waters.

The crater has a bright ray system, as well as an unusual dark flow-feature associated with the southern rim. The flow-feature is interpreted as impact melt.

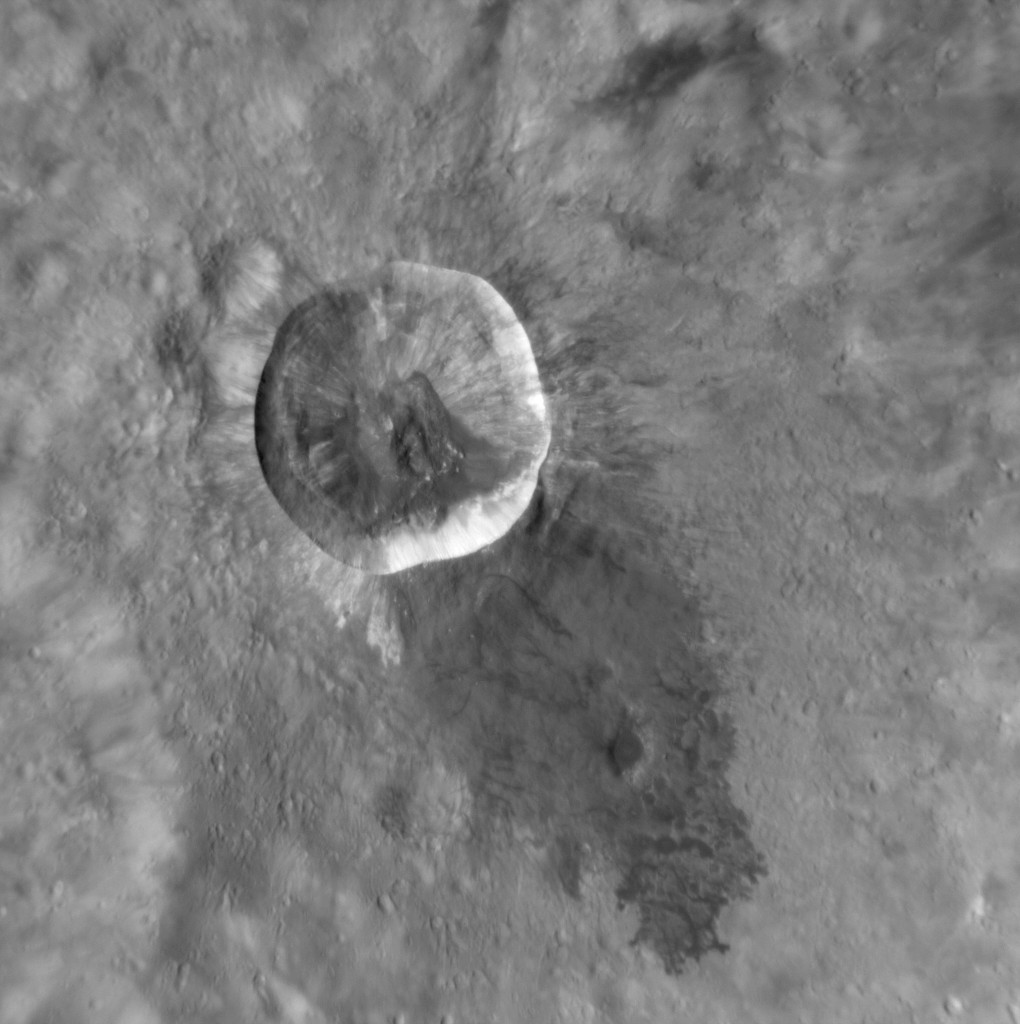
Waters crater with the flow-feature

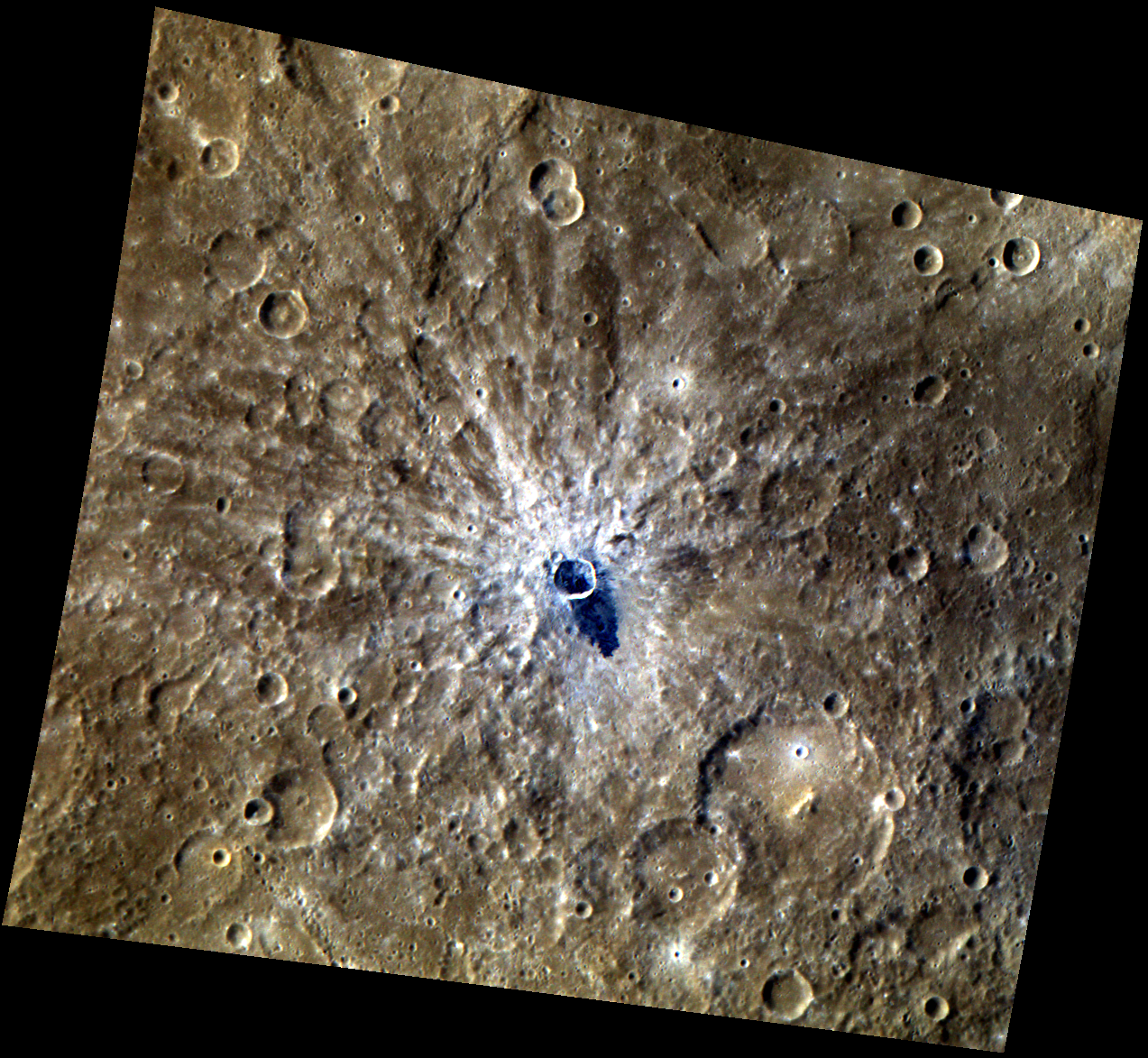
Enhanced-color image also from MESSENGER
