= Ray system =

Radial streaks of material thrown out during formation of an impact crater

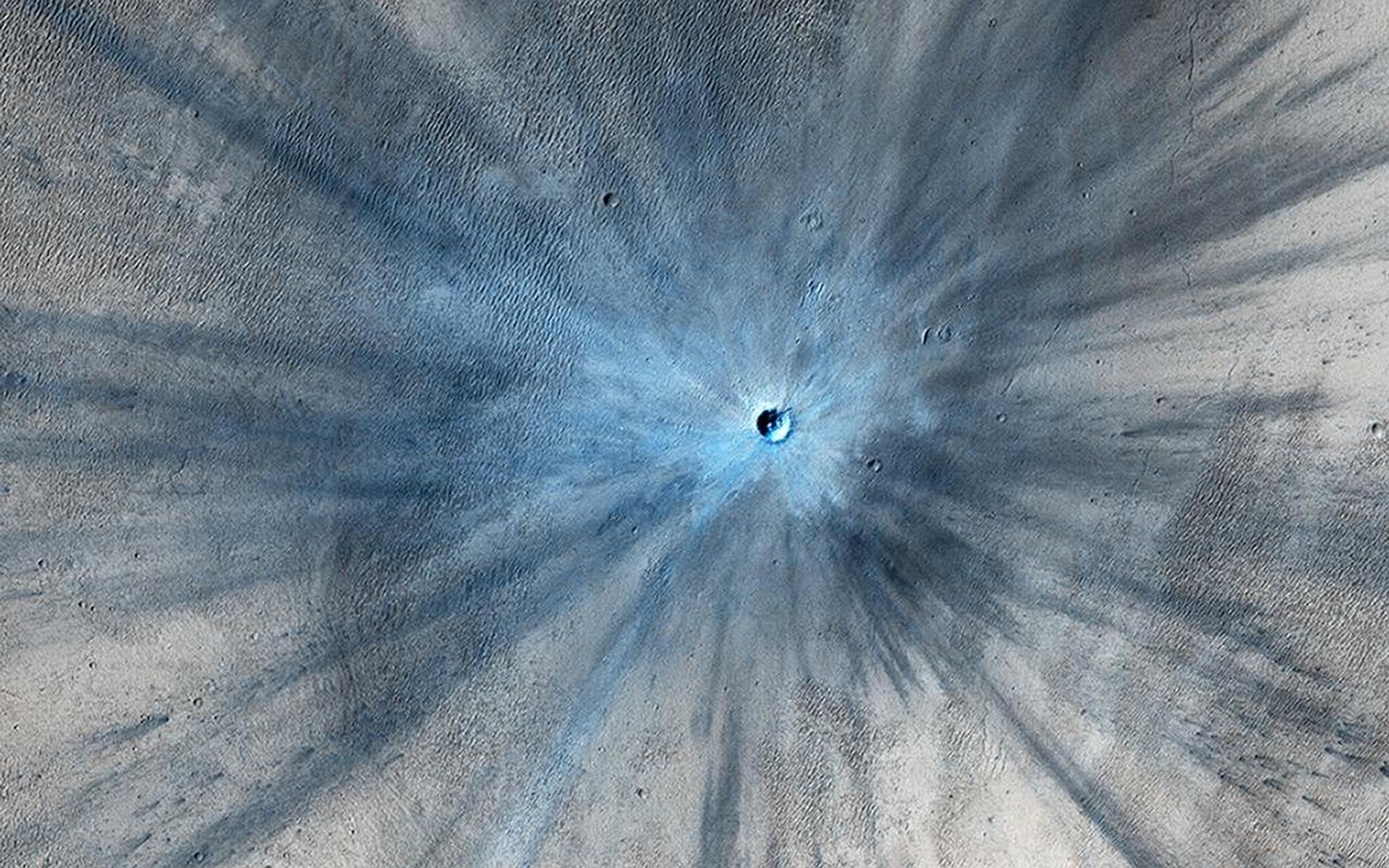
Fresh impact crater on Mars showing a prominent ray system of ejecta. This 30 m (98 ft) diameter crater formed between July 2010 and May 2012 (19 November 2013; 3.7°N 53.4°E).

In planetary geology, a ray system comprises radial streaks of fine ejecta thrown out during the formation of an impact crater, looking somewhat like many thin spokes coming from the hub of a wheel. The rays may extend for lengths up to several times the diameter of their originating crater, and are often accompanied by small secondary craters formed by larger chunks of ejecta. Ray systems have been identified on the Moon, Earth (Kamil Crater), Mercury, and some moons of the outer planets. Originally it was thought that they existed only on planets or moons lacking an atmosphere, but more recently they have been identified on Mars in infrared images taken from orbit by 2001 Mars Odyssey's thermal imager.

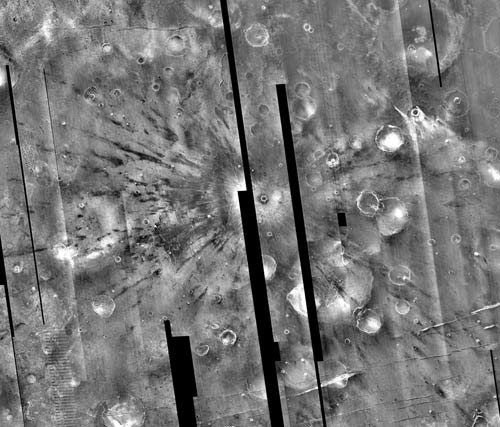
Gratteri crater, a rayed crater on Mars that was imaged by THEMIS at night. An individual THEMIS image, of which this mosaic is comprised, is ~32 km across.

Rays appear at visible, and in some cases infrared wavelengths, when ejecta are made of material with different albedo (surface reflectivity) or thermal properties from the surface on which they are deposited. Typically, visible rays have a higher albedo than the surrounding surface. More rarely an impact will excavate low albedo material, for example basaltic-lava deposits on the lunar maria. Thermal rays, as seen on Mars, are especially apparent at night when slopes and shadows do not influence the infrared energy emitted by the Martian surface.

The layering of rays across other surface features can be useful as an indicator of the relative age of the impact crater, because over time various processes obliterate the rays. On non-atmosphered bodies such as the Moon, space weathering from exposure to cosmic rays and micrometeorites causes a steady reduction of the differential between the ejecta's albedo and that of the underlying material. Micrometeorites in particular produce a glassy melt in the regolith that lowers the albedo. Rays can also become covered by lava flows (such as those of Lichtenberg on the moon), or by other impact craters or ejecta.

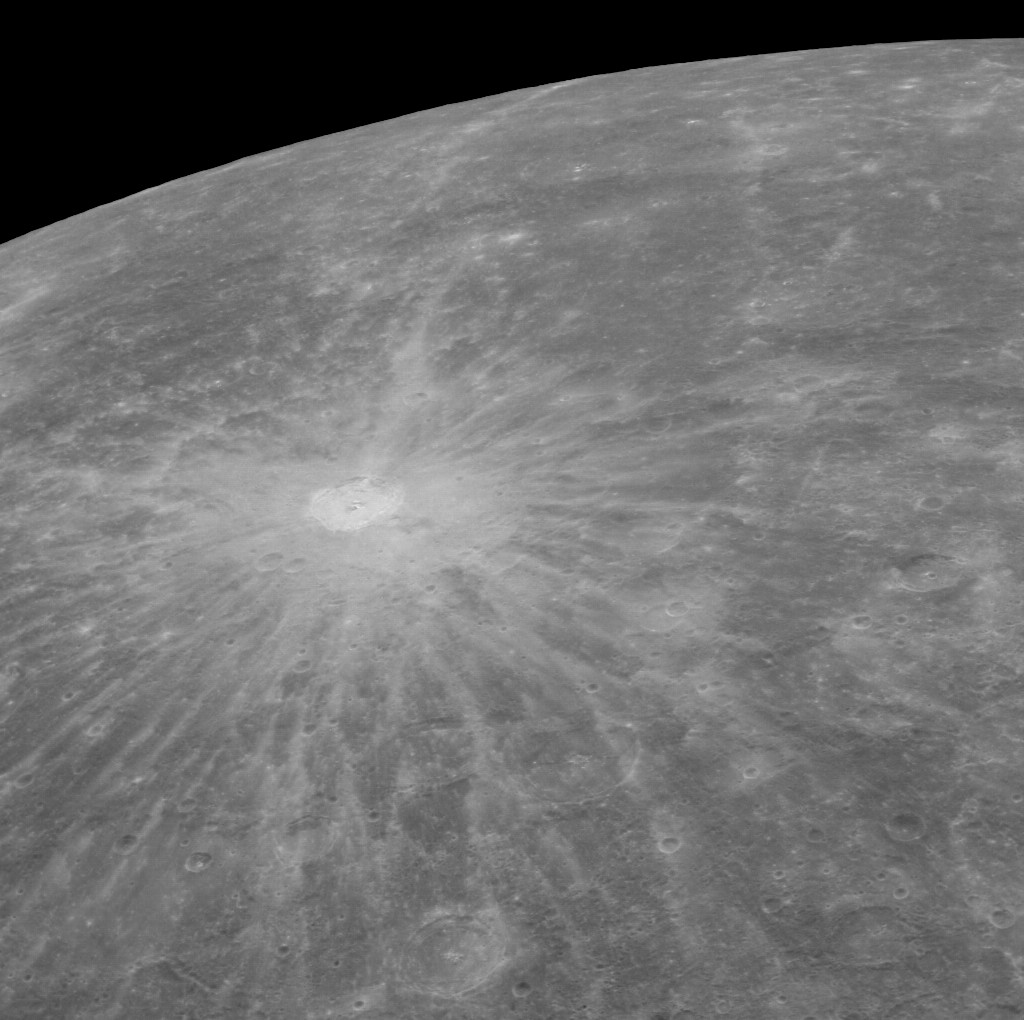
The rays of Kuiper, one of the freshest craters on Mercury

== Lunar rays ==
The physical nature of lunar rays has historically been a subject of speculation. Early hypotheses suggested that they were deposits of salt from evaporated water. Later they were thought to be deposits of volcanic ash or streaks of dust. After the impact origin of craters became accepted, Eugene Shoemaker suggested during the 1960s that the rays were the result of fragmented ejecta material.

Recent studies suggest that the relative brightness of a lunar ray system is not always a reliable indicator of the age of a ray system. Instead the albedo also depends on the portion of iron oxide (FeO). Low portions of FeO result in brighter materials, so such a ray system can retain its lighter appearance for longer periods. Thus the material composition needs to be factored into the albedo analysis to determine age.

Among the lunar craters on the near side with pronounced ray systems are Aristarchus, Copernicus, Kepler, Proclus, Dionysius, Glushko, and Tycho. Smaller examples include Censorinus, Stella, and Linné. Similar ray systems also occur on the far side of the Moon, such as the rays radiating from the craters Giordano Bruno, Necho, Ohm, Jackson, King, and the small but prominent Pierazzo.

Most lateral transport of primary ejecta from impact craters is limited to a distance of a few crater radii, but some larger impacts, such as the impacts that made the Copernicus and Tycho craters, launched primary ejecta halfway around the moon.

North Ray and South Ray craters, each with a clear ray system, were observed from the ground by the astronauts of Apollo 16 in 1972.

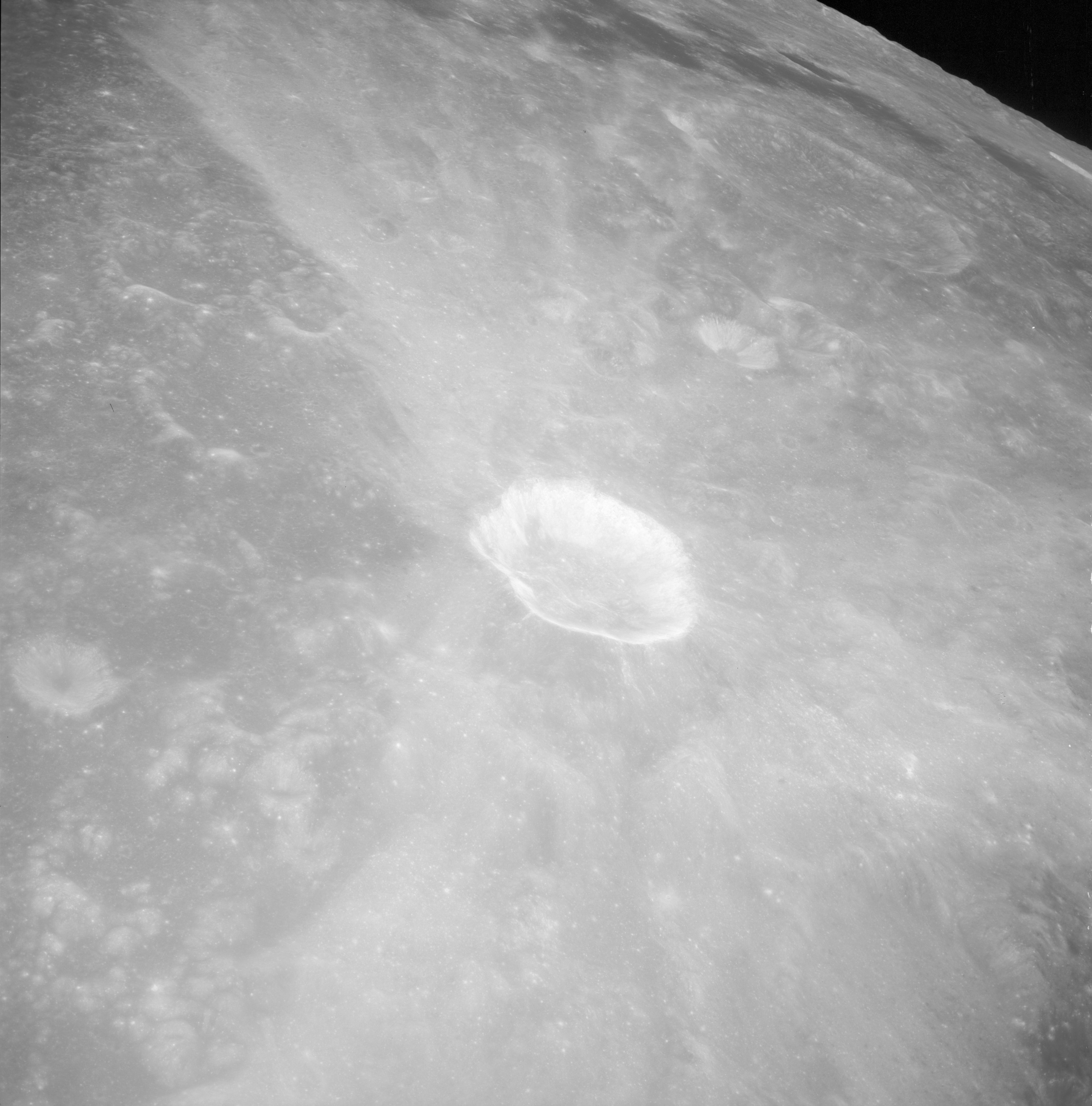
Asymmetrical ray system about the lunar crater Proclus (Apollo 15 image)

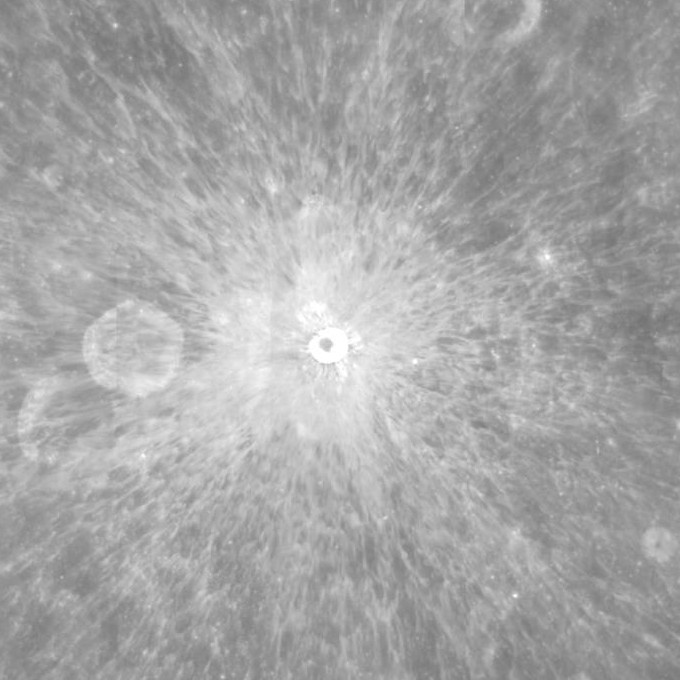
Pierazzo crater (Mosaic of Clementine images)

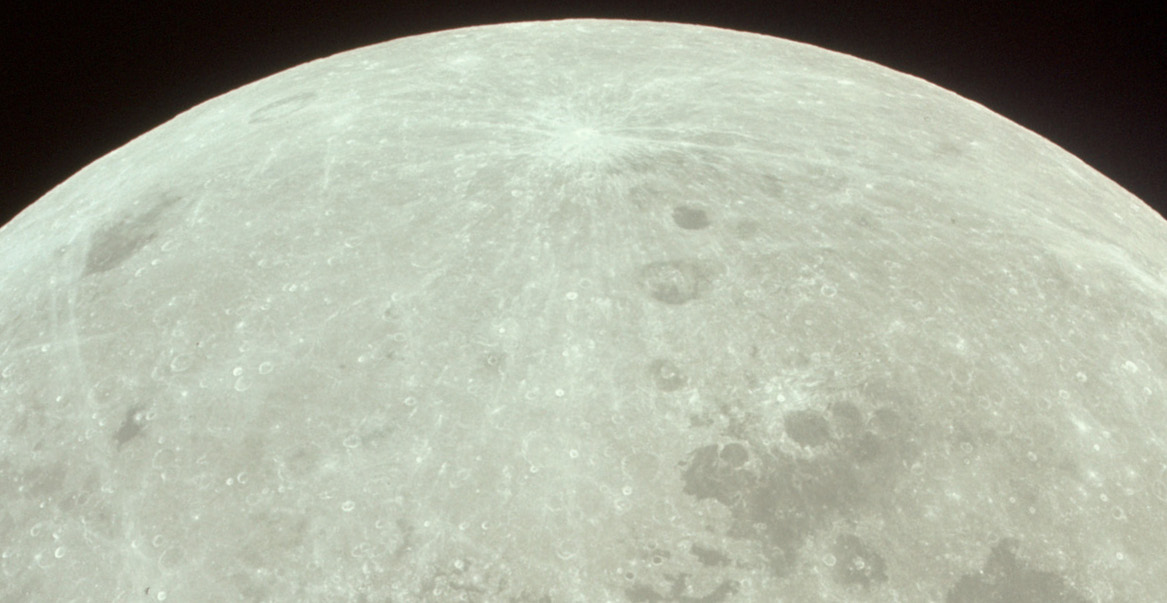
The rays of Giordano Bruno extend for hundreds of kilometers from the small crater (Apollo 11 image)

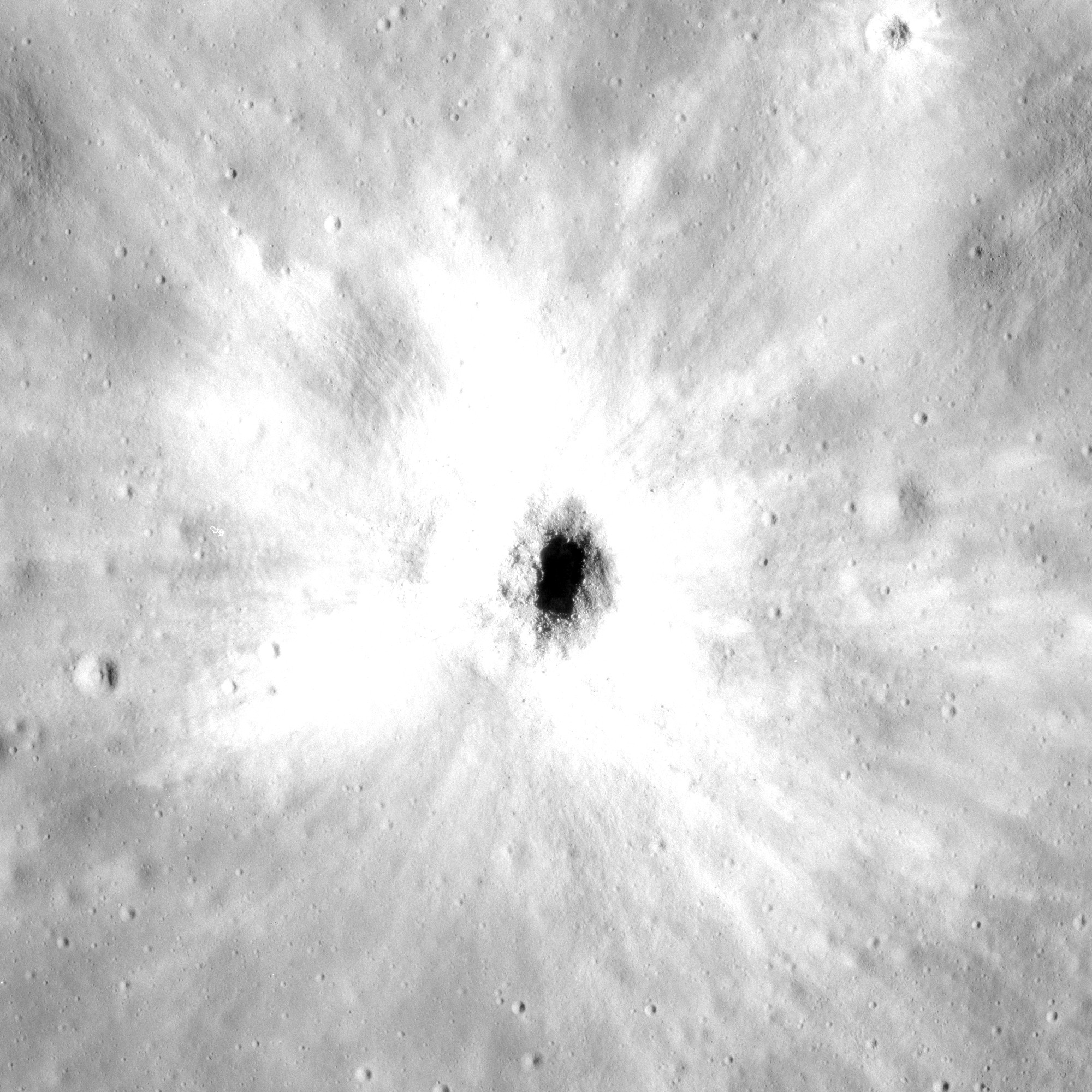
South Ray (Apollo 16 image)

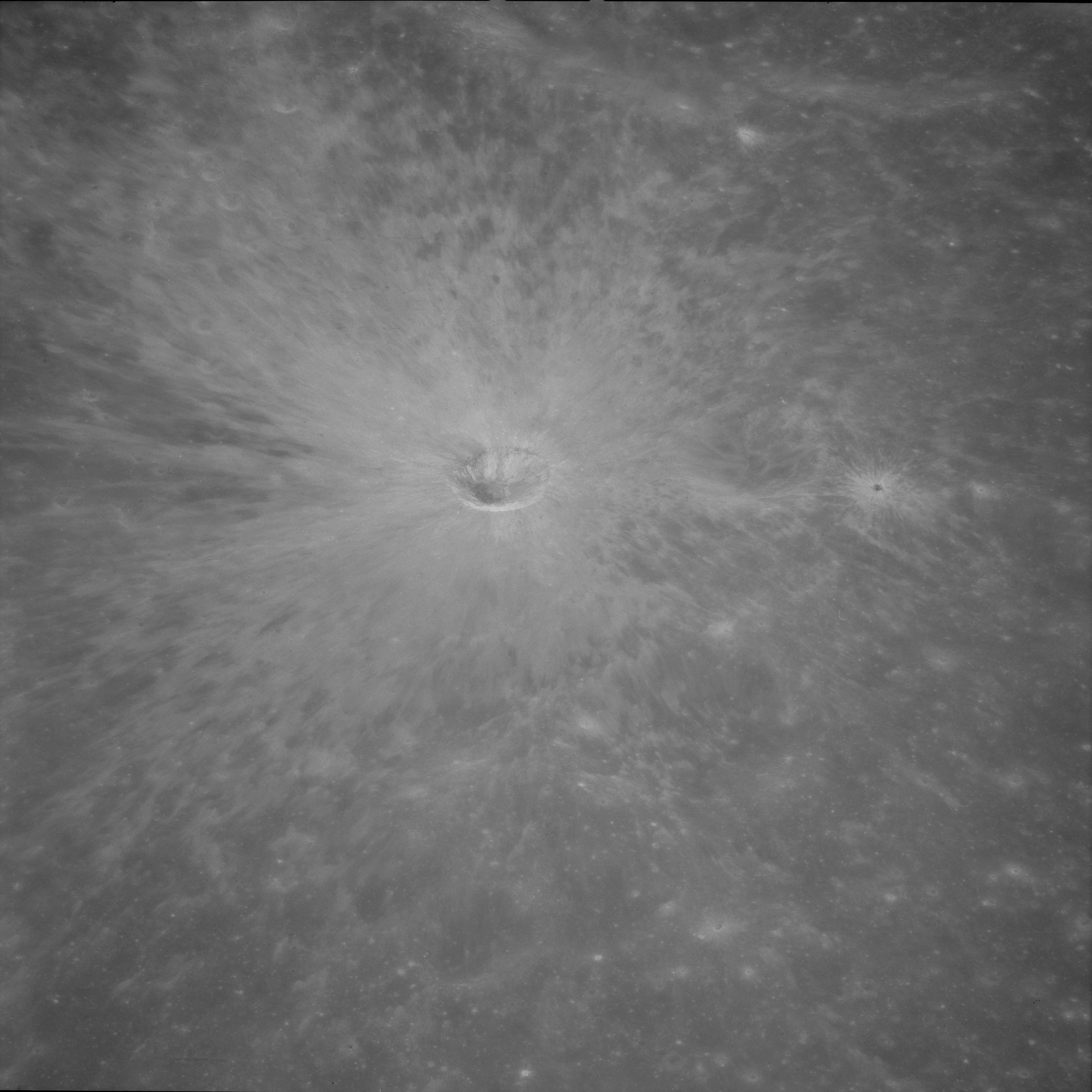
Crater ray system on the far side of the Moon (Apollo 11 image)

== See also ==
- List of craters with ray systems
- Reiner Gamma
