= Giambologna (crater) =

Crater on Mercury

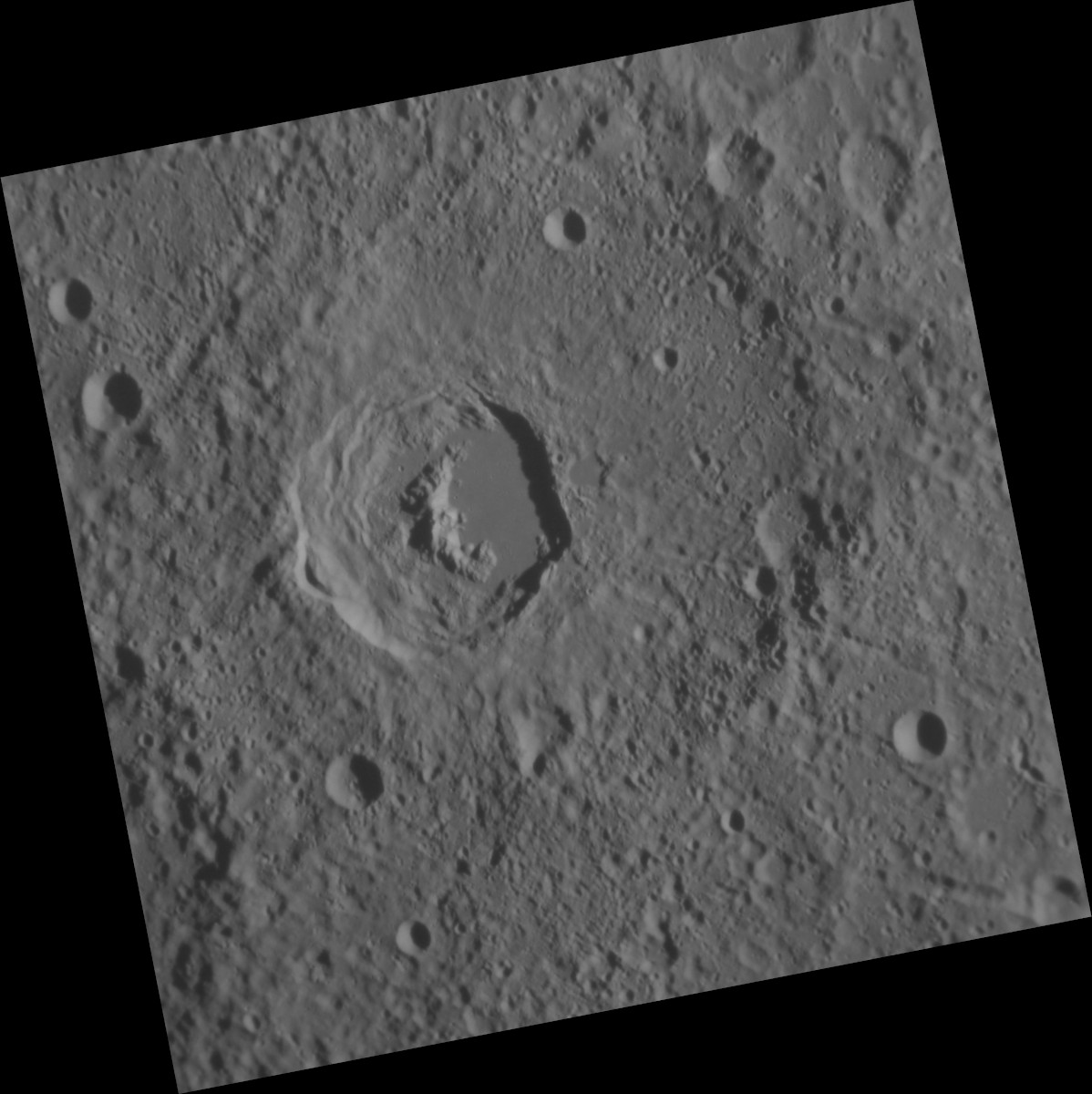
- MESSENGER image
- Planet: Mercury
- Coordinates: 42.58°S 124.11°W
- Quadrangle: Michelangelo
- Diameter: 69 km (43 mi)
- Eponym: Giambologna

Giambologna is a crater on Mercury. Its name was adopted by the International Astronomical Union (IAU) on December 16, 2013. Giambologna is named for the Flemish sculptor Jean Boulogne Giambologna. The crater was first imaged by Mariner 10 in 1974.

Giambologna has an unusual, asymmetrical morphology in the east-west direction. The western side has several broad terraces and no significant flat floor, while the eastern side has a steep cliff at the rim dropping to a flat floor. The central peak is arcuate in shape.

Giambologna lies on the western side of a much larger, unnamed crater of approximately 150 km (93 mi) diameter. To the north is the crater Surikov, and to the west is Delacroix.

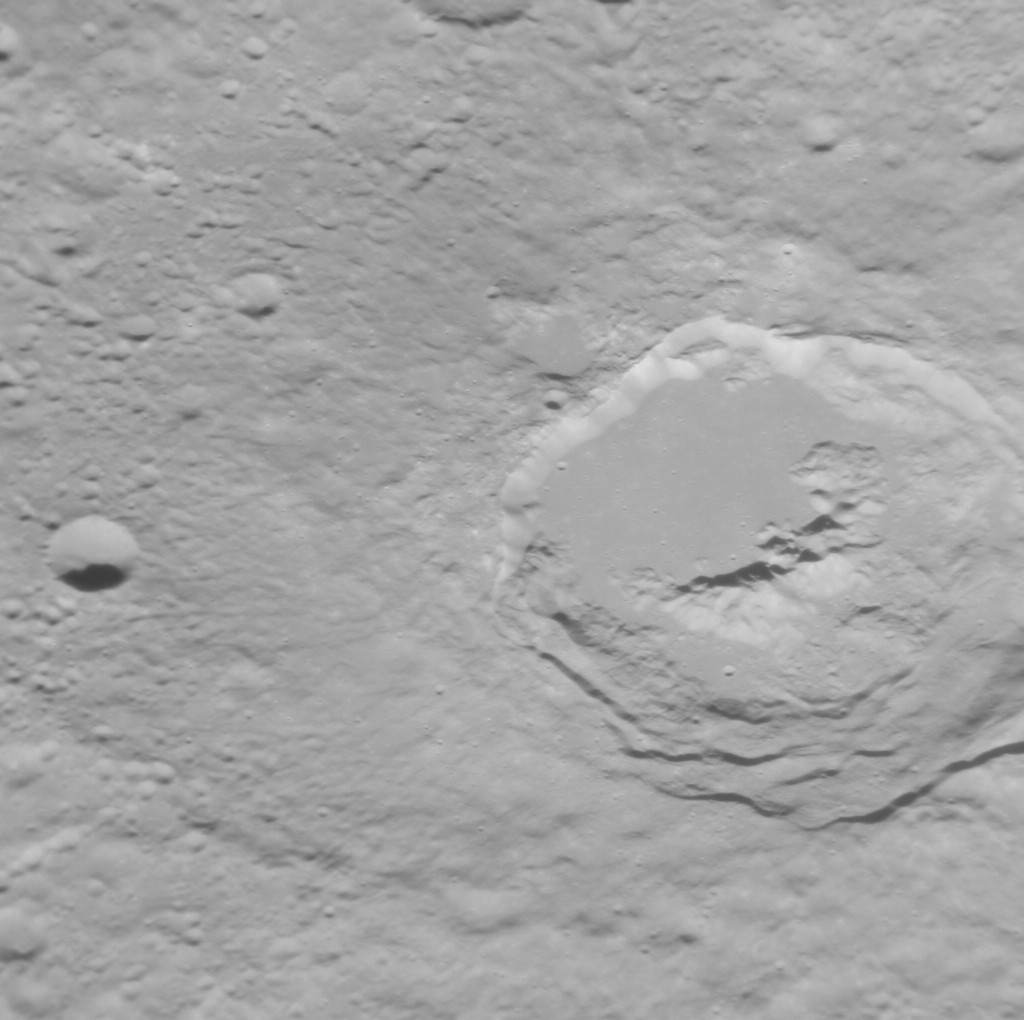
Oblique view of Giambologna crater

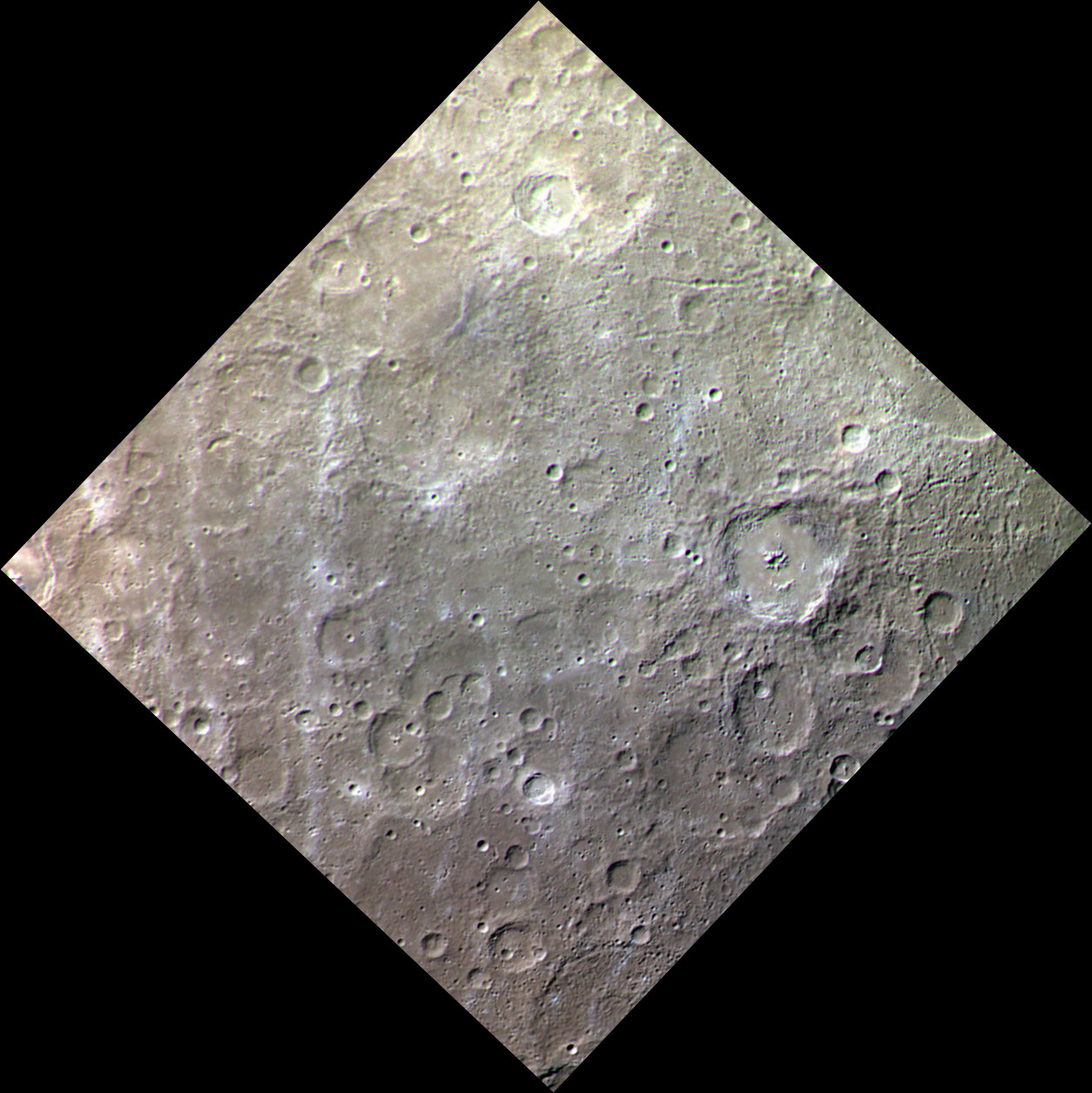
Approximate color image of the surface of Mercury. Giambologna is at top center. The prominent crater at right is Hawthorne.
