= Riemenschneider (crater) =

Crater on Mercury

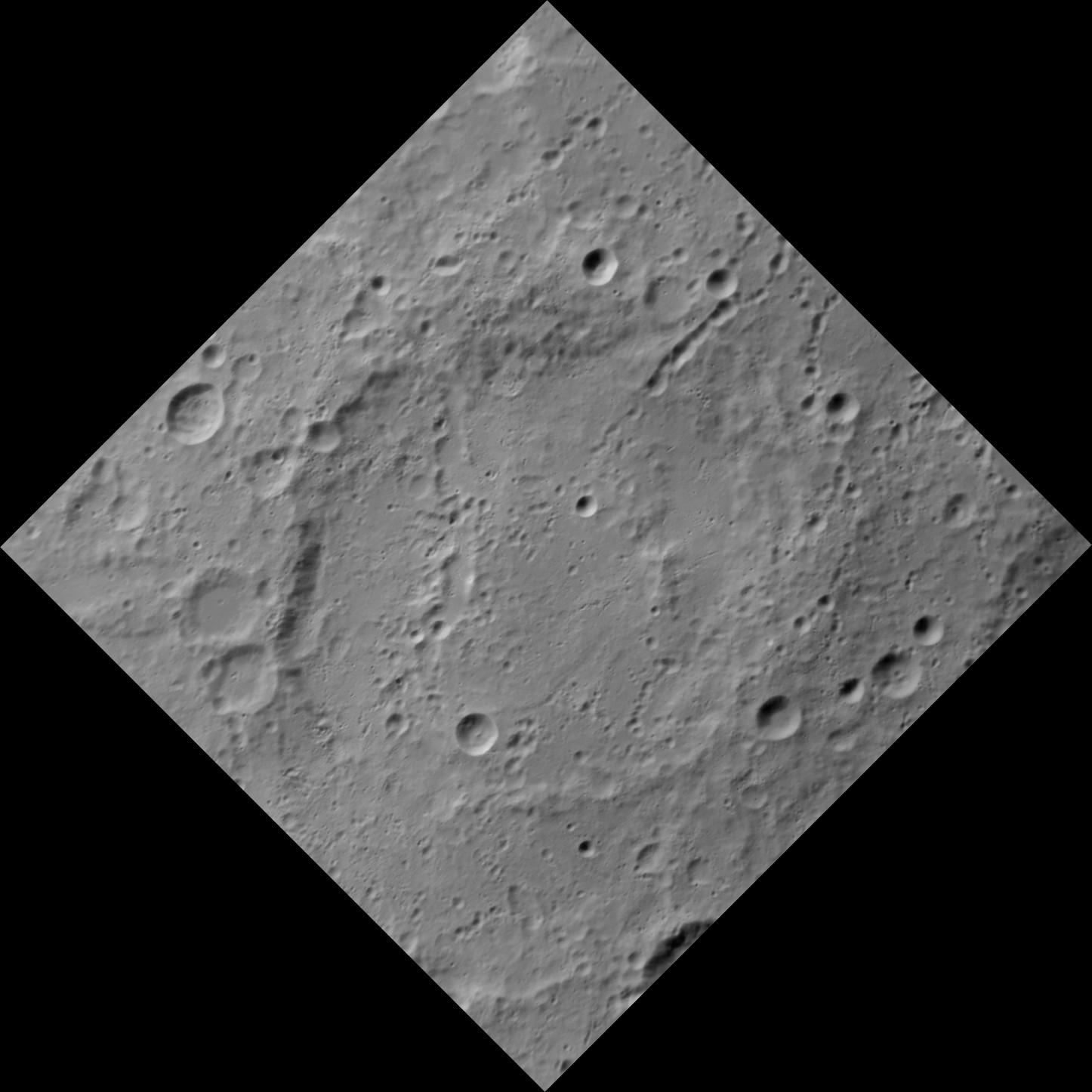
- MESSENGER NAC image
- Planet: Mercury
- Coordinates: 52.75°S 99.95°W
- Quadrangle: Michelangelo
- Diameter: 183 km (114 mi)
- Eponym: Tilman Riemenschneider

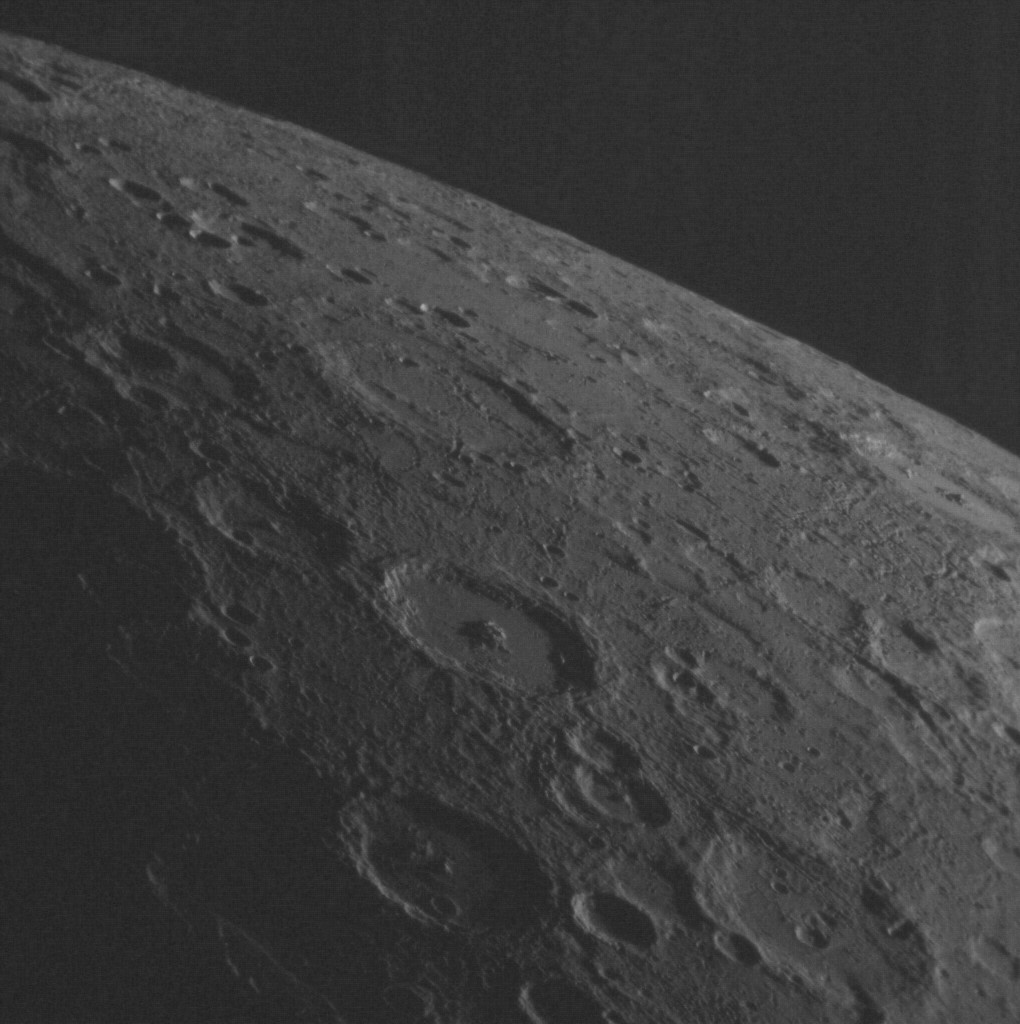
Sūr Dās crater (below center) and Riemenschneider crater (above center), from MESSENGER's first flyby in 2008

Riemenschneider is a crater on Mercury. Its name was adopted by the International Astronomical Union (IAU) in 1979. Riemenschneider is named for the German sculptor Tilman Riemenschneider. The crater was first imaged by Mariner 10 in 1974.

To the northeast of Riemenschneider is Sūr Dās crater. To the southeast is a scarp called Fram Rupes.
