= Dowland (disambiguation) =

John Dowland (1563–1626) was an English Renaissance composer, lutenist, and singer.

Dowland may refer to:

- Dowland (crater), a crater on Mercury, named after John Dowland
- Dowland, Devon, civil parish in England
- The Dowland Manuscript, an early masonic manuscript, published by James Dowland
- Jack Dowland, pen name for Philip K. Dick
- John Dowland (RAF officer) (1914–1942), English aviator
- Robert Dowland (1591–1641), English lutenist and composer, son of John Dowland
