= Sūr Dās (crater) =

Crater on Mercury

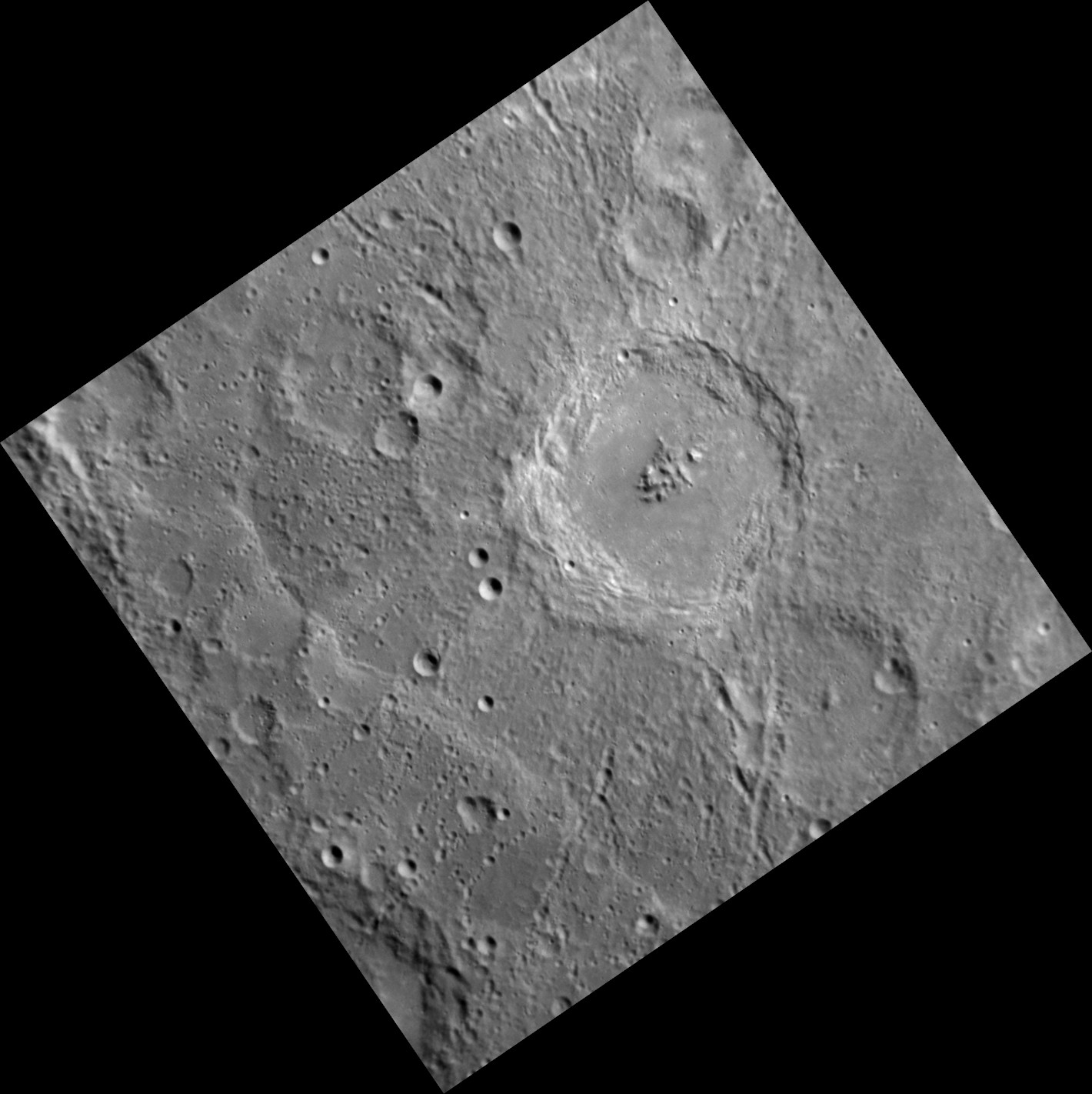
- MESSENGER NAC image
- Planet: Mercury
- Coordinates: 46.98°S 93.57°W
- Quadrangle: Michelangelo
- Diameter: 131 km (81 mi)
- Eponym: Surdas

Sūr Dās is a crater on Mercury. Its name was adopted by the International Astronomical Union (IAU) in 1979. The crater is named for the Indian poet Surdas. The crater was first imaged by Mariner 10 in 1974.

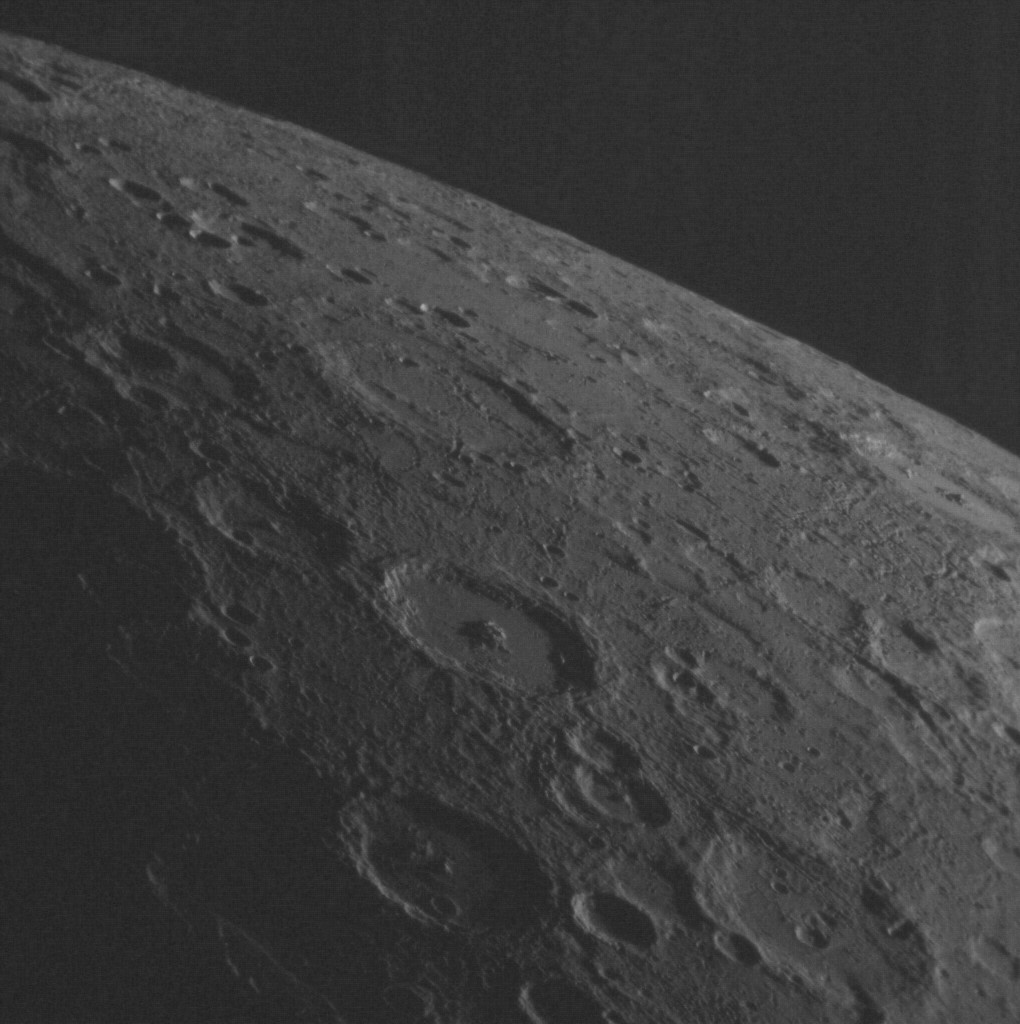
Sūr Dās and Riemenschneider craters, from MESSENGER's first flyby in January 2008

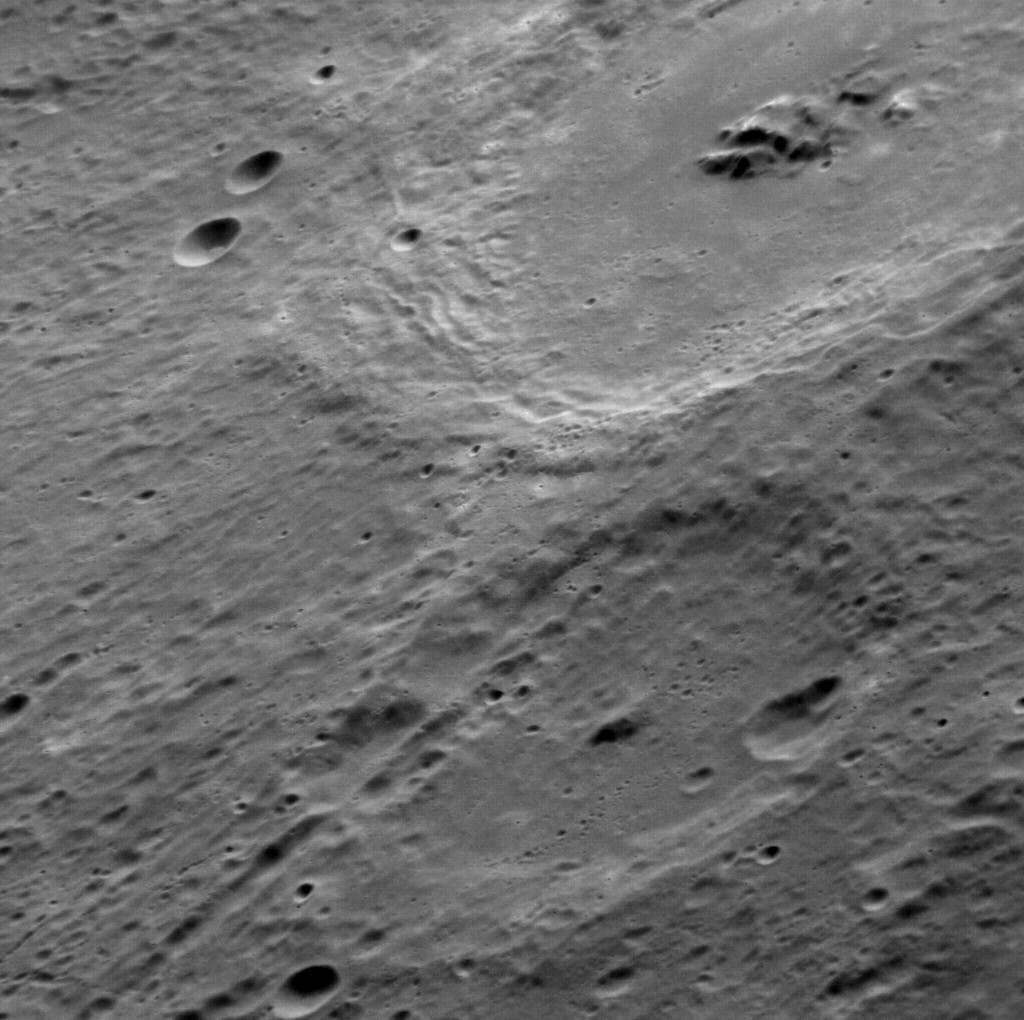
Oblique view
