= Brooks (crater) =

Crater on Mercury

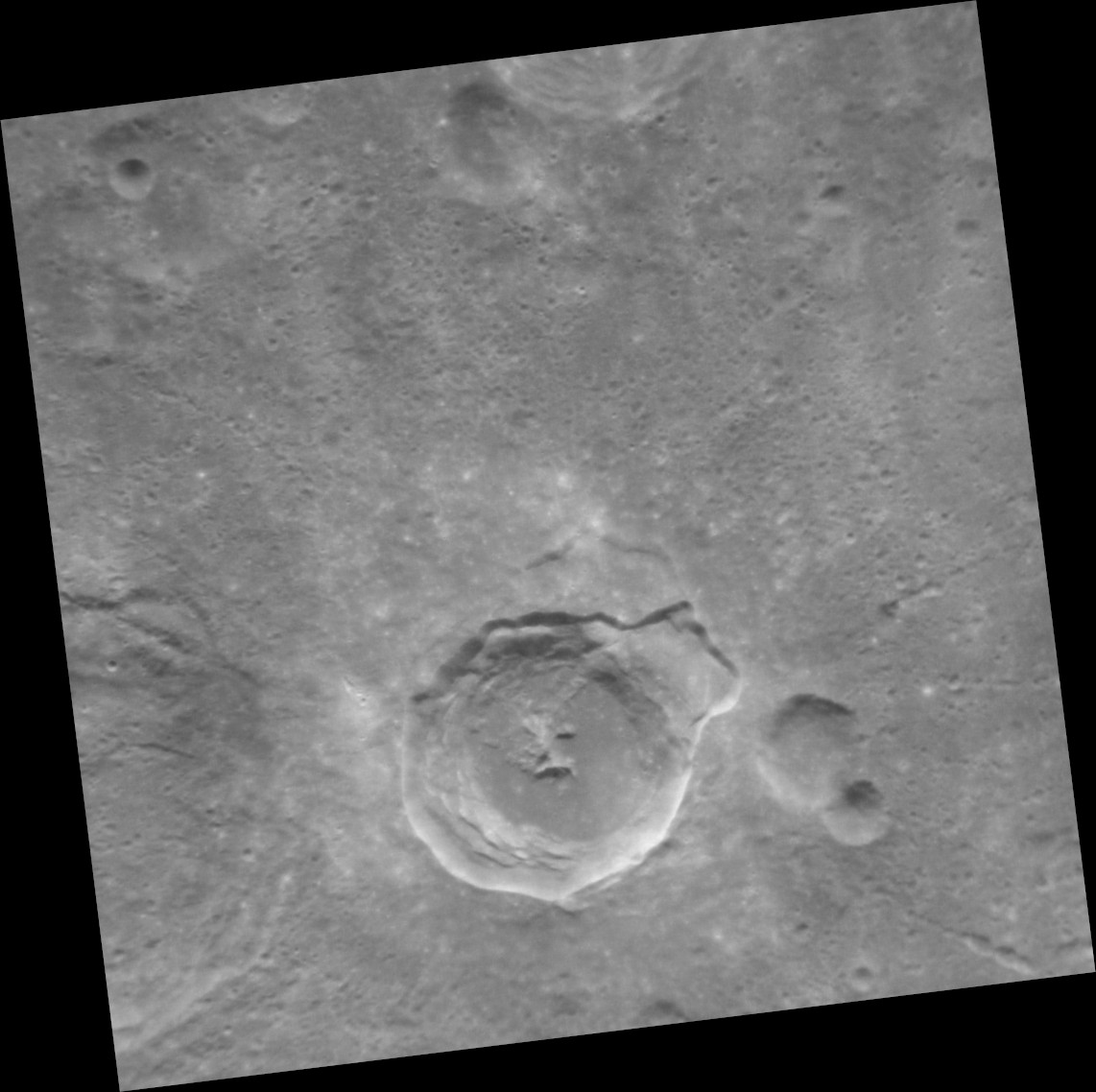
- MESSENGER NAC image of Brooks
- Feature type: Central-peak impact crater
- Location: Michelangelo quadrangle, Mercury
- Coordinates: 45.22°S 168.02°W
- Diameter: 34 km
- Eponym: Gwendolyn Brooks

Brooks is a crater on the southwestern part Mercury. It has a diameter of 34 kilometers. Its name was adopted by the International Astronomical Union in 2015, and refers to the American poet and novelist Gwendolyn Brooks (1917–2000).

Brooks is east of the large crater Dostoevskij.
