= Shelley (crater) =

Crater on Mercury

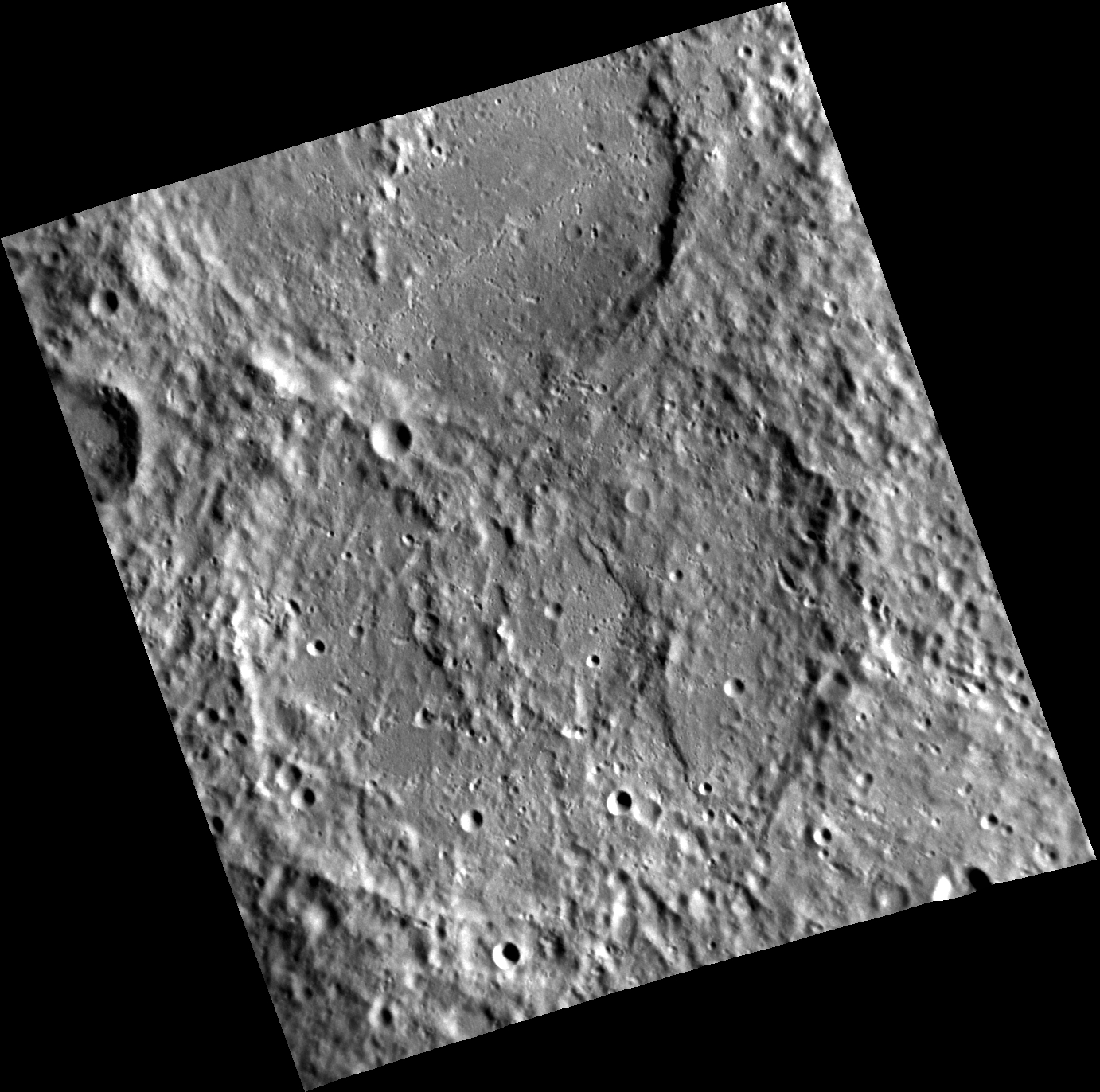
- MESSENGER NAC image
- Planet: Mercury
- Coordinates: 47.69°S 128.27°W
- Quadrangle: Michelangelo
- Diameter: 171 km (106 mi)
- Eponym: Percy Bysshe Shelley

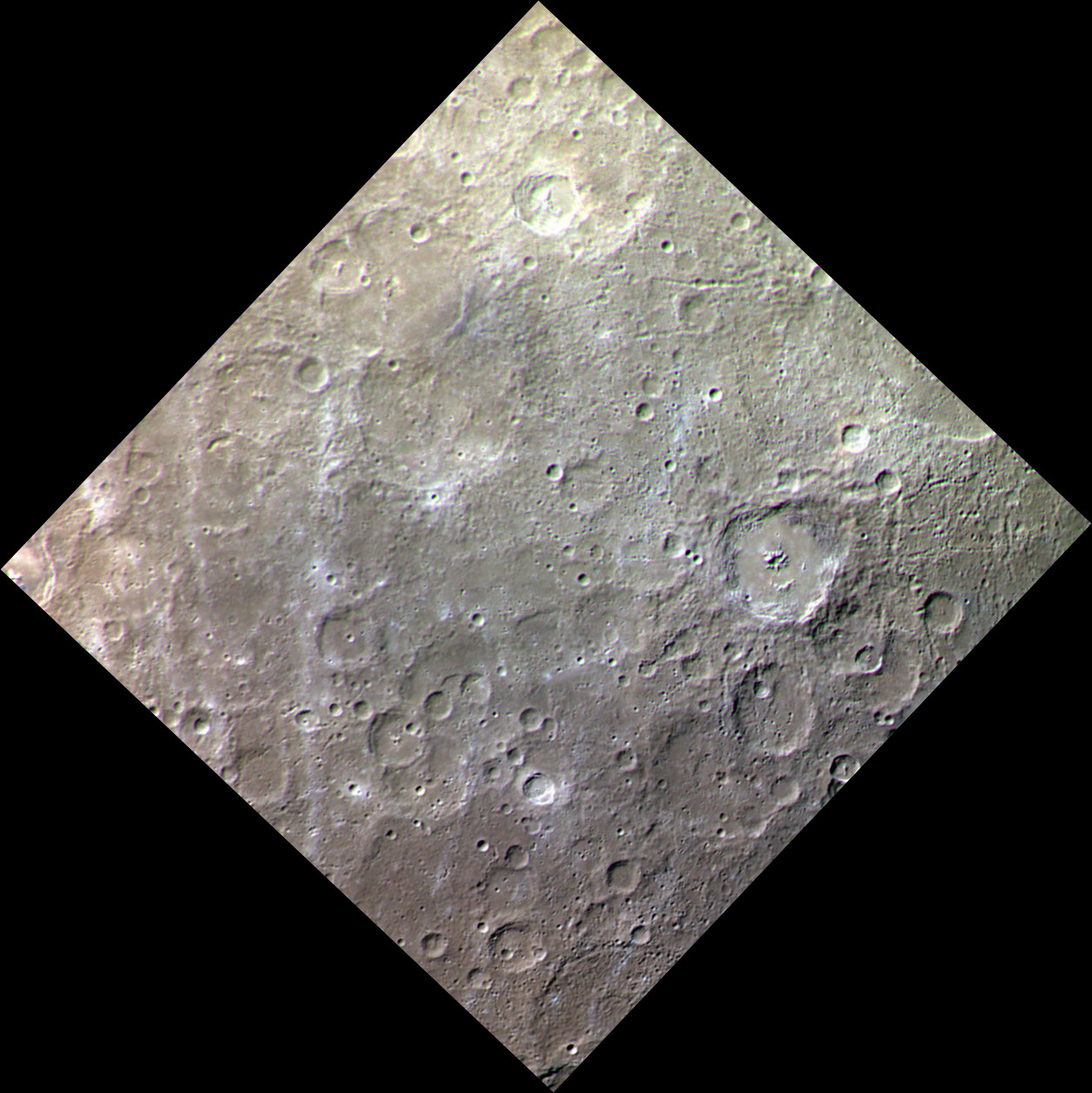
Approximate color image of the surface of Mercury. The prominent crater at right is Hawthorne, and Shelley is above left of center.

Shelley is a crater on Mercury. Its name was adopted by the IAU in 1979, after the English poet Percy Bysshe Shelley, who lived from 1792 to 1822. The crater was first imaged by Mariner 10 in 1974.

Shelley is overlain by the slightly smaller and younger crater Delacroix, to the north.
