= Hals (crater) =

Crater on Mercury

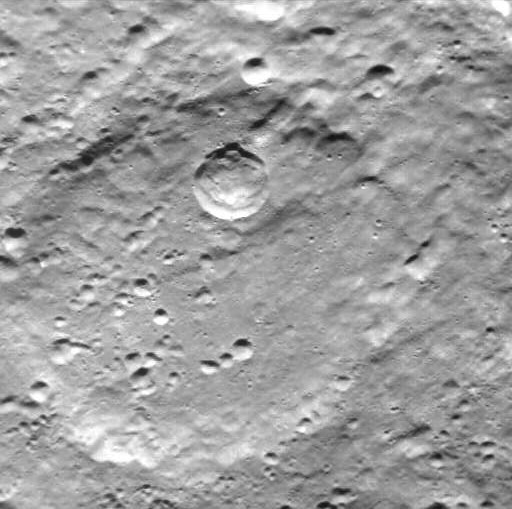
- MESSENGER NAC image of Hals
- Feature type: Impact crater
- Location: Michelangelo quadrangle, Mercury
- Coordinates: 54.96°S 114.99°W
- Diameter: 93 km (58 mi)
- Eponym: Frans Hals

Hals is a crater on Mercury. It has a diameter of 93 kilometers. Its name was adopted by the International Astronomical Union (IAU) in 1985. Hals is named for the Dutch painter Frans Hals, who lived from 1581 to 1666. The crater was first imaged by Mariner 10 in 1974.

The crater Hawthorne is north of Hals.

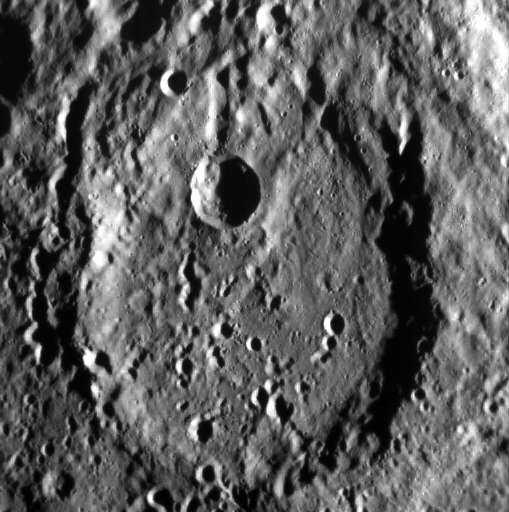
Another MESSENGER NAC image

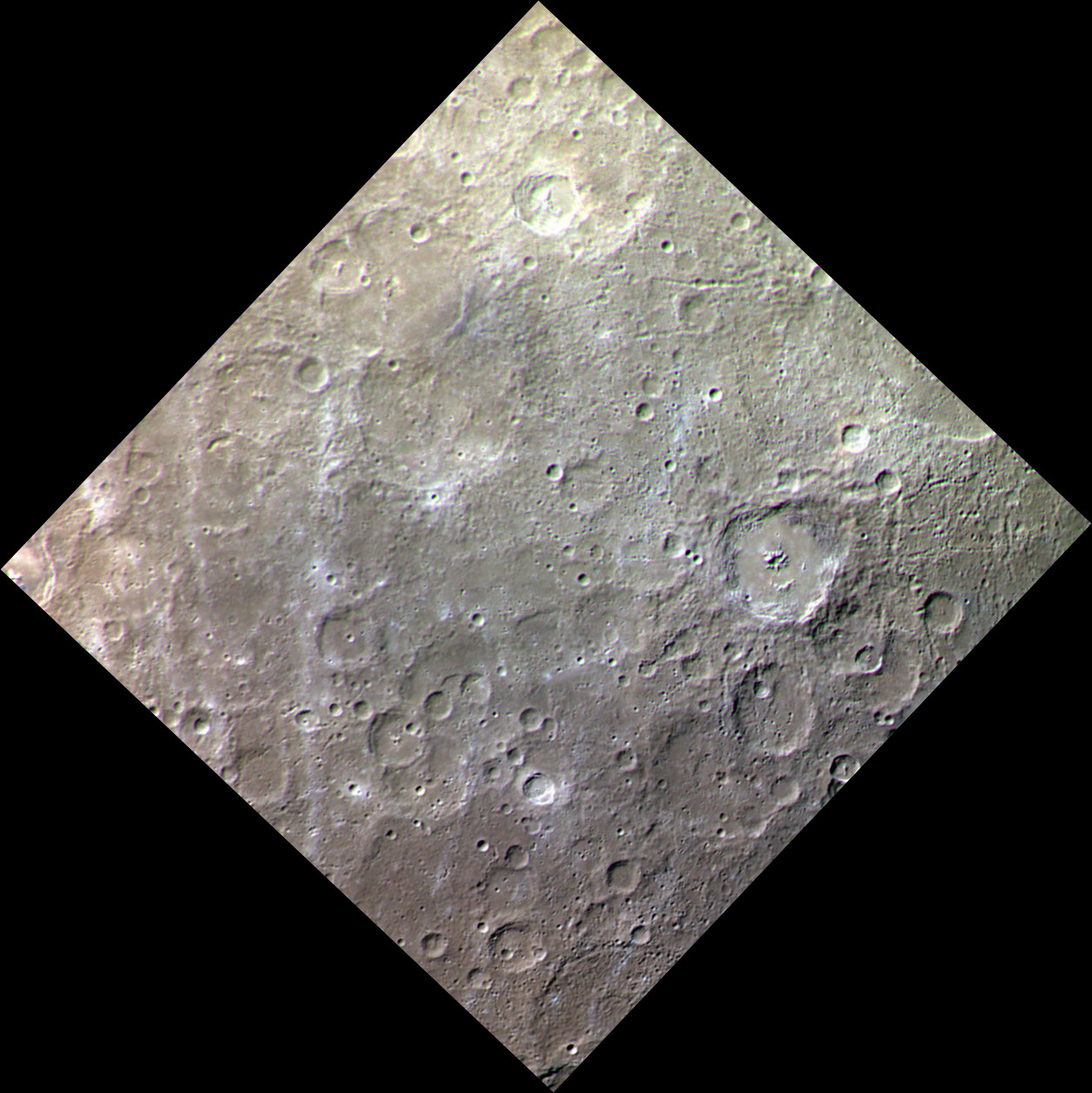
Approximate color image of the surface of Mercury including Hals crater. The prominent crater at right is Hawthorne, and Hals is south of it.

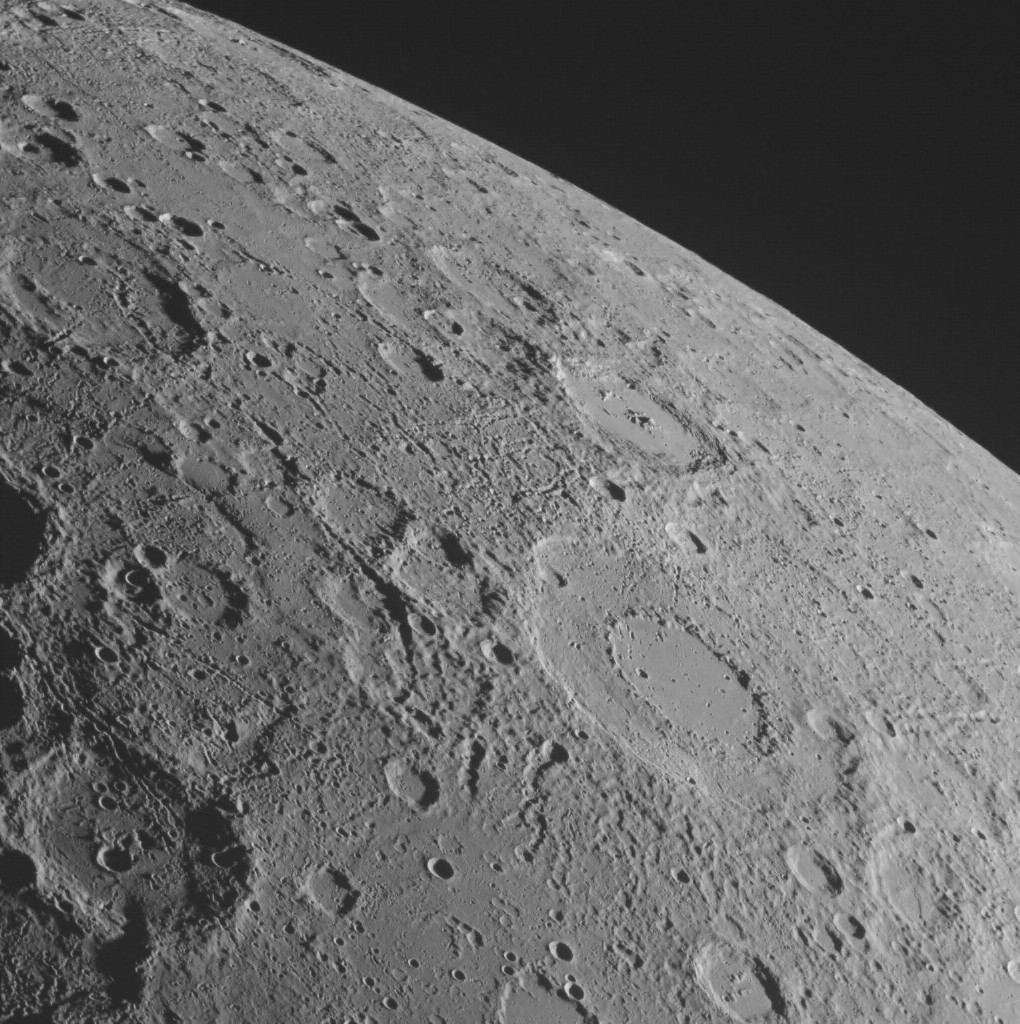
Oblique regional view with Hawthorne right of center and Hals next to it
