= Surikov (crater) =

Crater on Mercury

- Planet: Mercury
- Coordinates: 36.98°S 124.9°W
- Quadrangle: Michelangelo
- Diameter: 224 km (139 mi)
- Eponym: Vasily Surikov

Surikov is a crater on the planet Mercury. Its name was adopted by the International Astronomical Union (IAU) in 1979. Surikov is named for the Russian painter Vasily Surikov. The crater was first imaged by Mariner 10 in 1974.

Surkiov is an ancient crater - the outer rim is barely distinguishable, but the inner peak ring is apparent. It is one of 110 peak ring basins on Mercury.

To the south of Surikov is Giambologna crater.

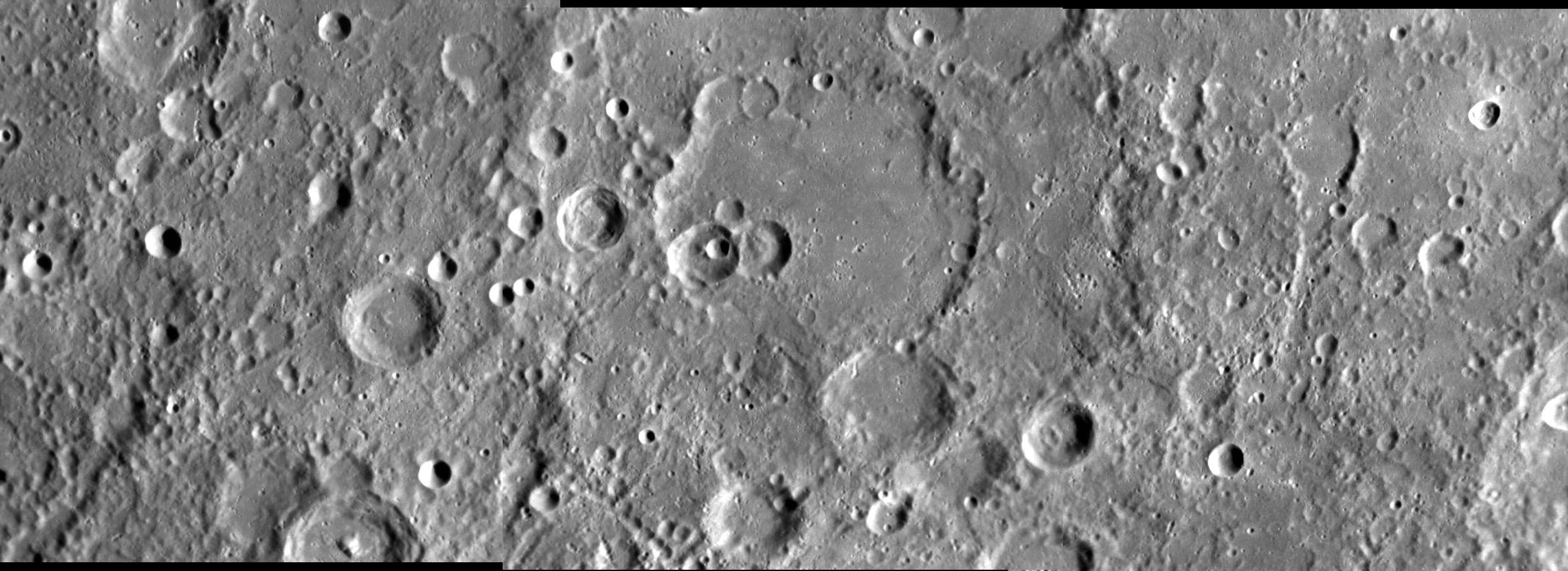
Surikov crater at center
