= Dowland (crater) =

Crater on Mercury

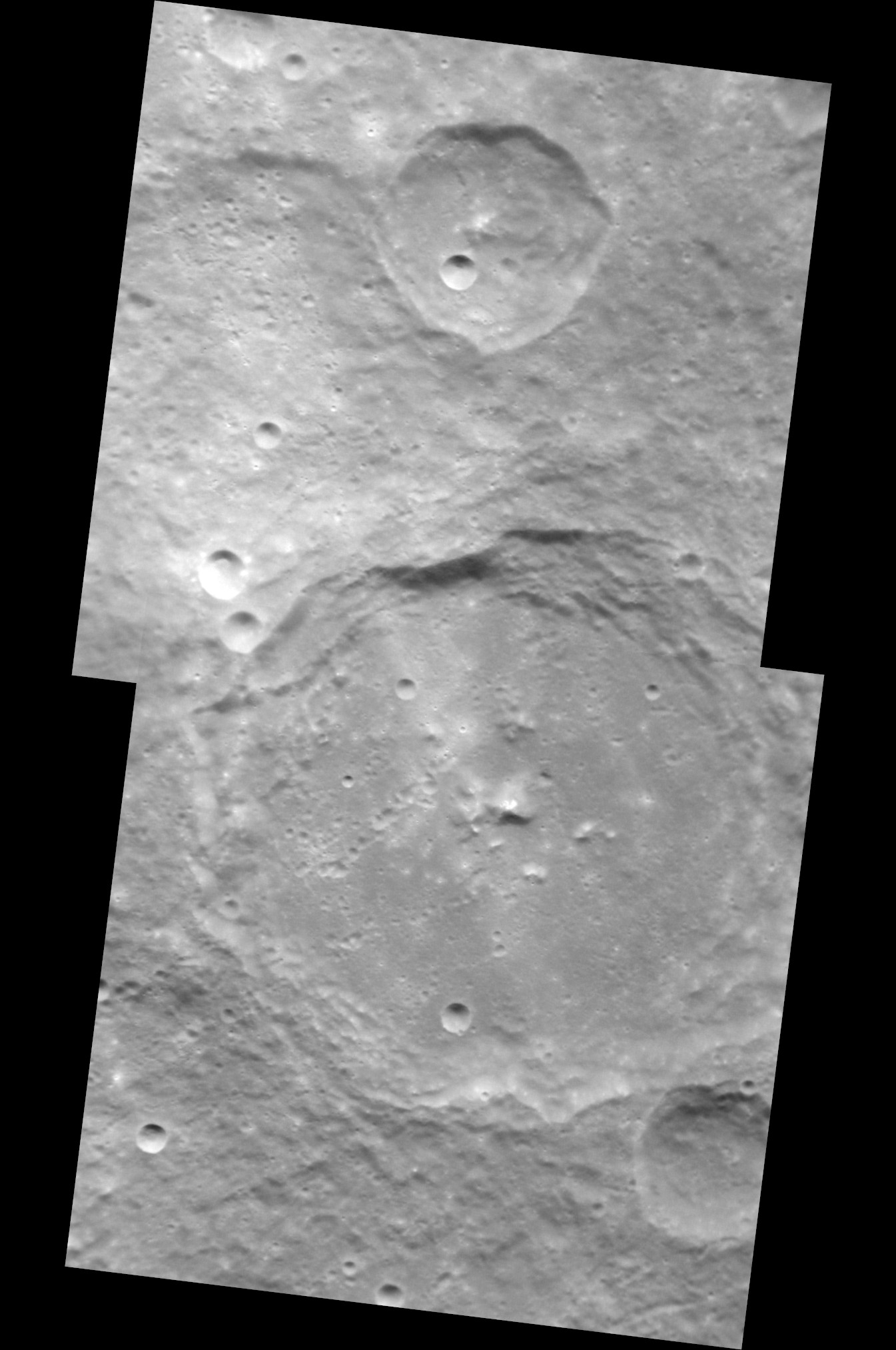
- MESSENGER NAC mosaic
- Feature type: Impact crater
- Location: Michelangelo quadrangle, Mercury
- Coordinates: 53.5°S 179.5°W
- Diameter: 158 km
- Eponym: John Dowland

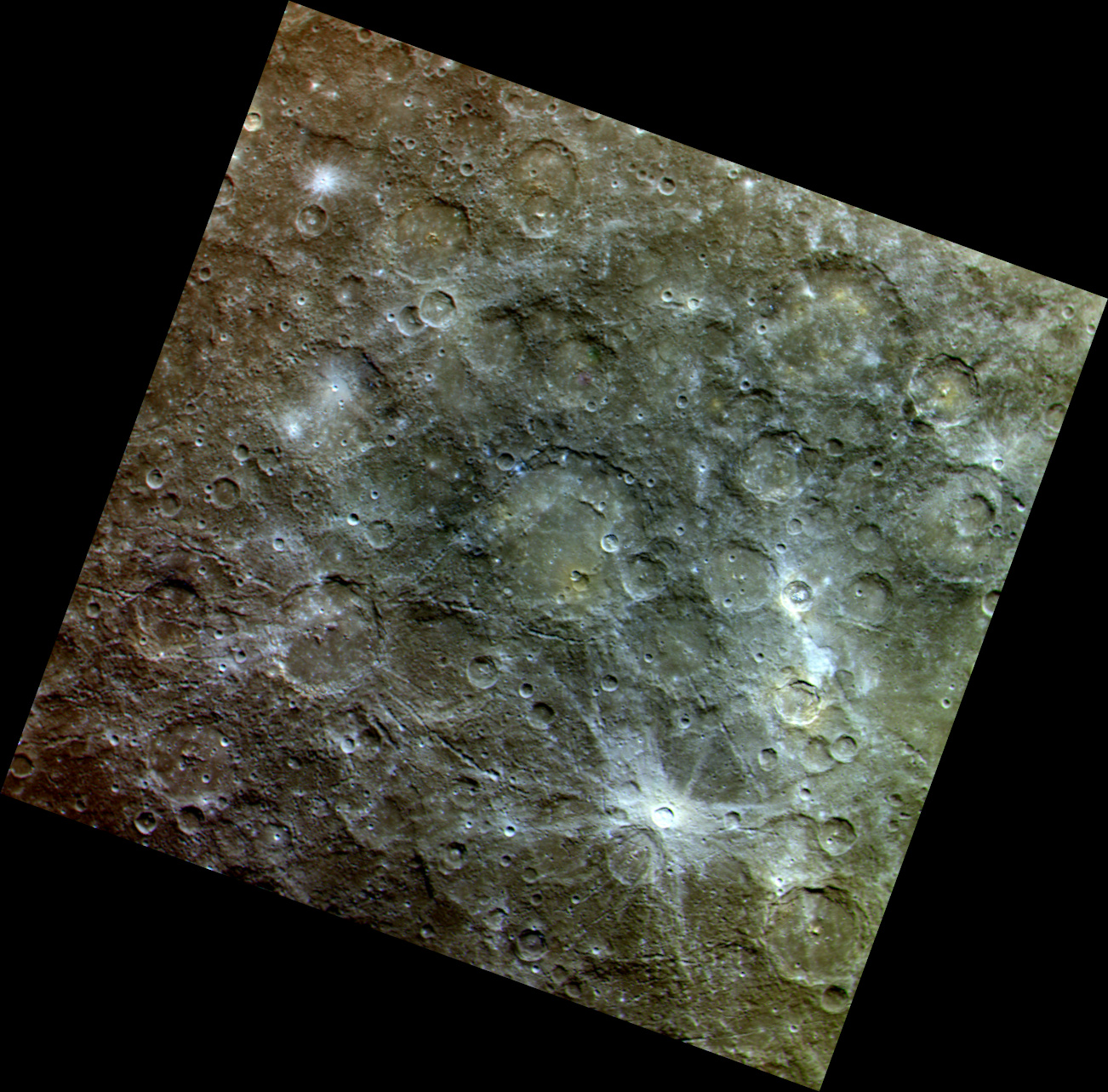
Exaggerated color MESSENGER image with Dowland in lower right

Dowland is a crater on Mercury. It has a diameter of 158 kilometers. Its name was adopted by the International Astronomical Union in 1979, and refers to the English composer John Dowland, who lived from 1562 to 1626.
