= Delacroix (crater) =

Crater on Mercury

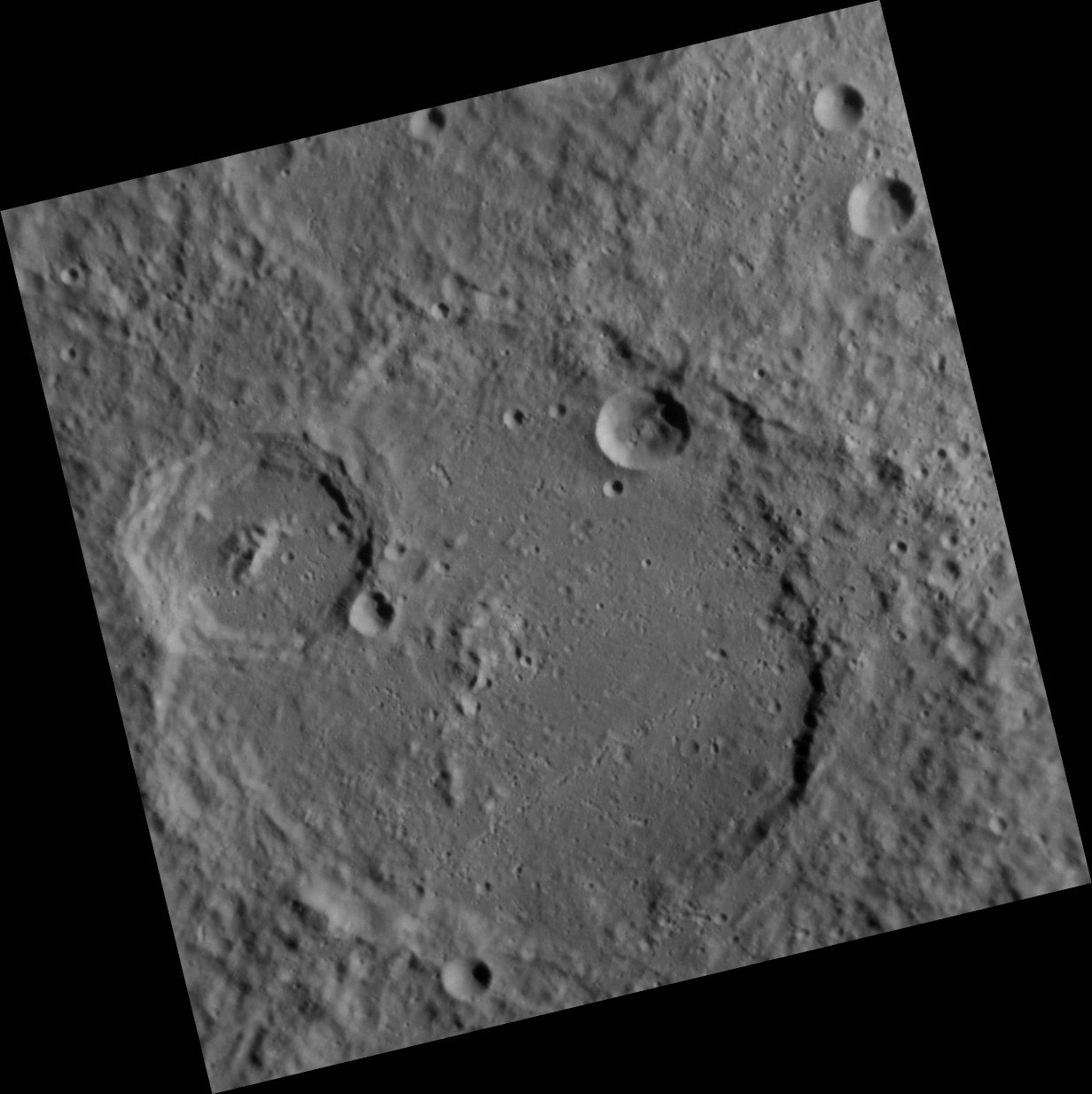
- MESSENGER NAC image of Delacroix
- Feature type: Impact crater
- Location: Michelangelo quadrangle, Mercury
- Coordinates: 44.32°S 129.51°W
- Diameter: 158 km (98 mi)
- Eponym: Eugène Delacroix

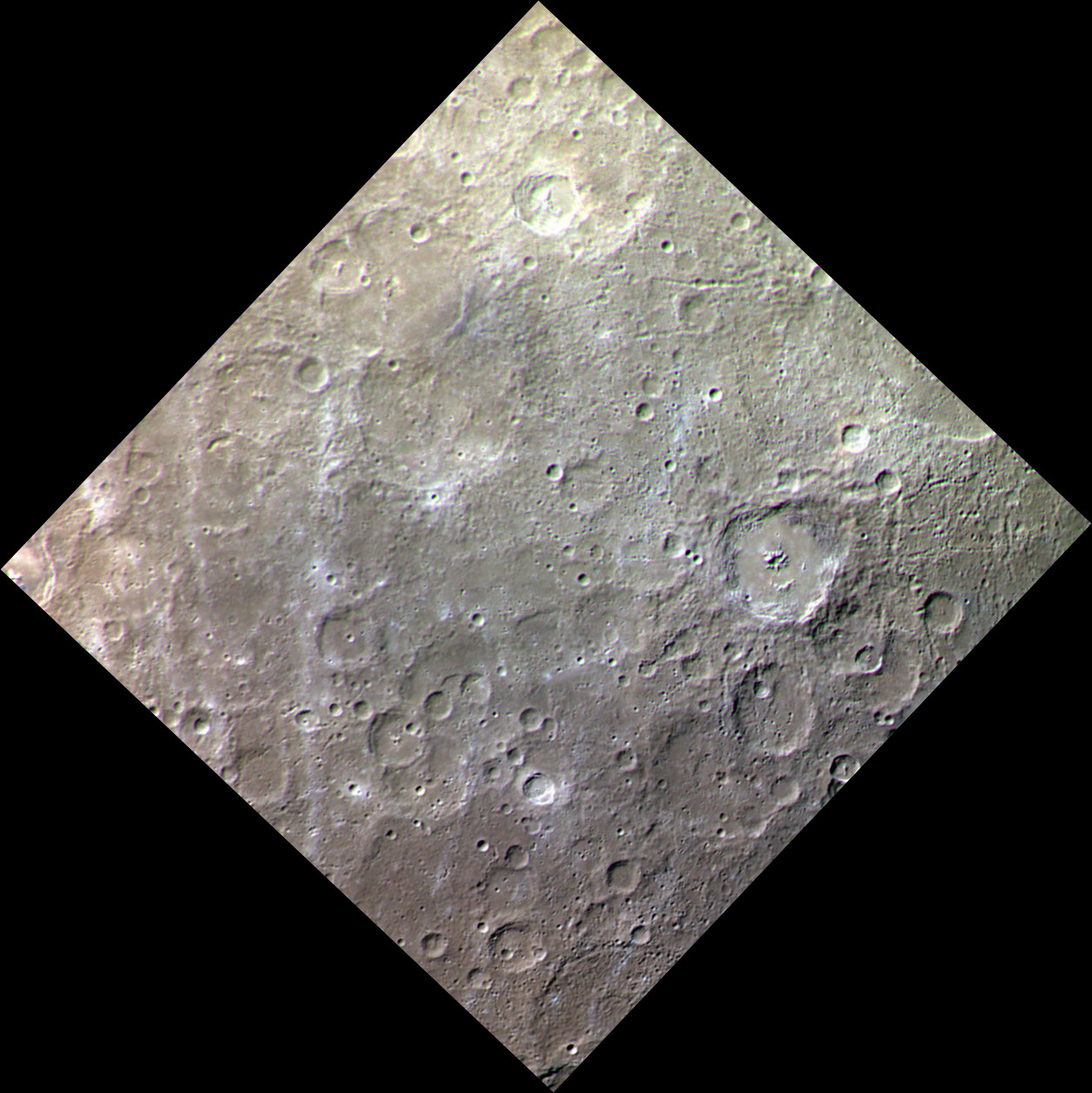
Approximate color image of the surface of Mercury. The prominent crater at right is Hawthorne, and Delacroix is along upper left edge.

Delacroix is a crater on Mercury. Its name was adopted by the International Astronomical Union in 1979. Delacroix is named for the French painter Eugène Delacroix, who lived from 1798 to 1863. The crater was first imaged by Mariner 10 in 1974.

Delacroix overlies the slightly larger and older crater Shelley, to the south.
