= Dostoevskij (crater) =

Crater on Mercury

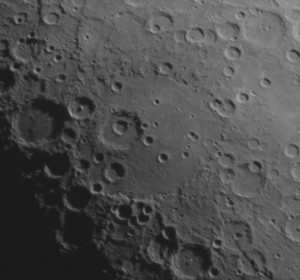
- MESSENGER image
- Feature type: Impact crater
- Location: Michelangelo quadrangle, Mercury
- Coordinates: 45.1°S 176.4°W
- Diameter: 430 km (270 mi)
- Eponym: Fyodor Dostoyevsky

Dostoevskij (sometimes Dostoevskii) is a crater on Mercury. It has a diameter of 430 kilometers. Its name was adopted by the International Astronomical Union in 1979. Dostoevskij is named for the Russian novelist Fyodor Dostoyevsky, who lived from 1821 to 1881. It is Tolstojan in age.

Just east of Dostoevskij is the crater Brooks.

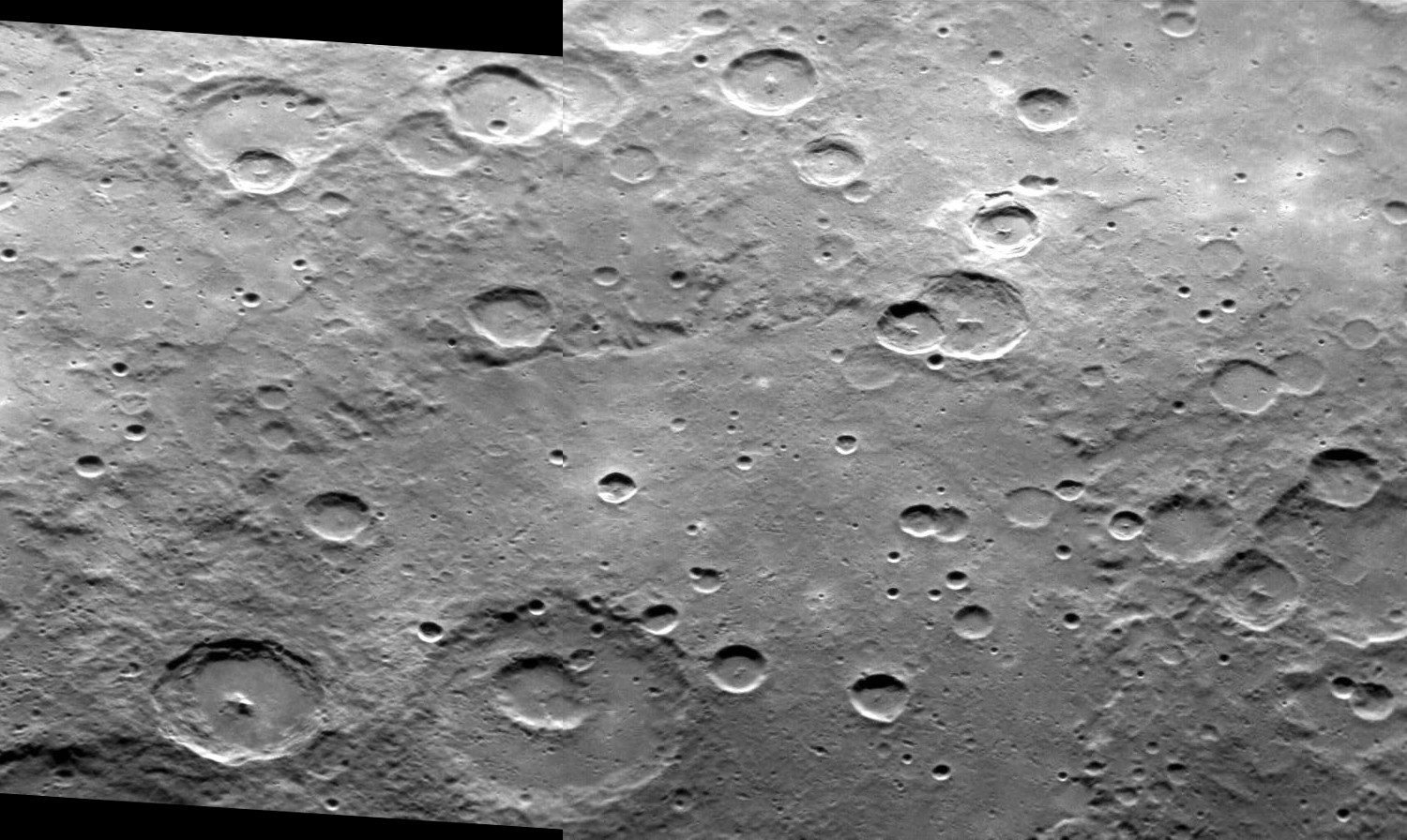
Oblique view also from MESSENGER

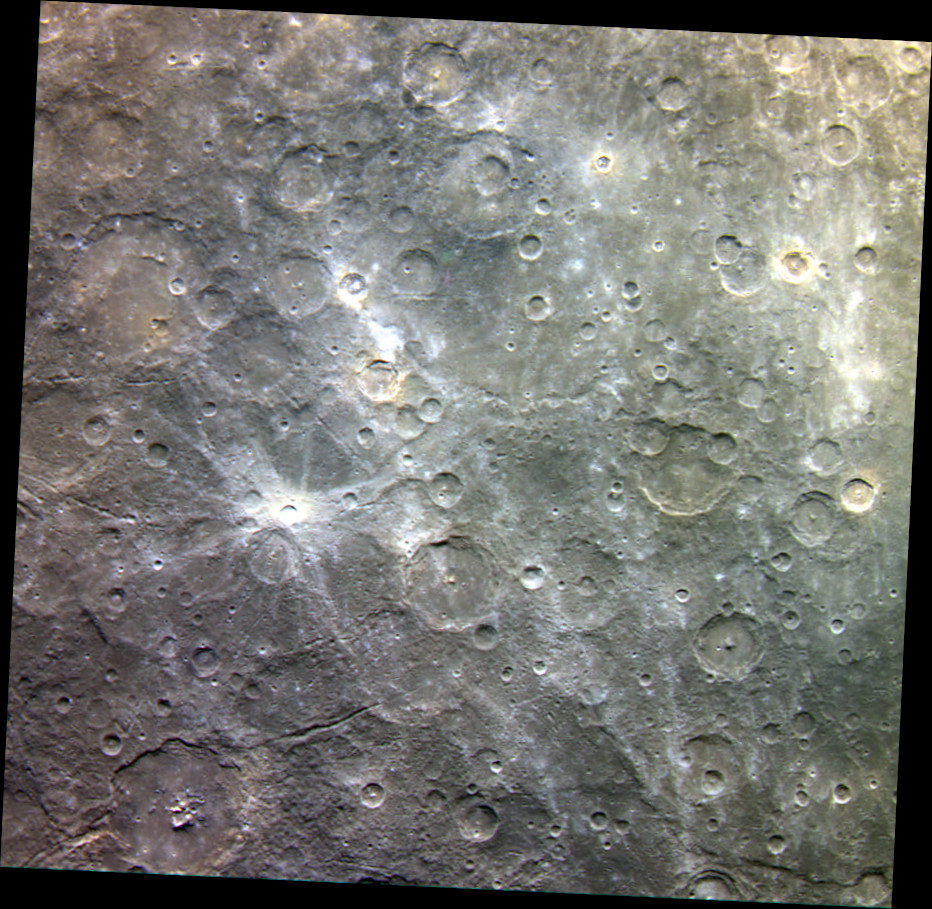
Regional view with Dostoevskij near top center, in exaggerated color
