= Michelangelo (crater) =

Crater on Mercury

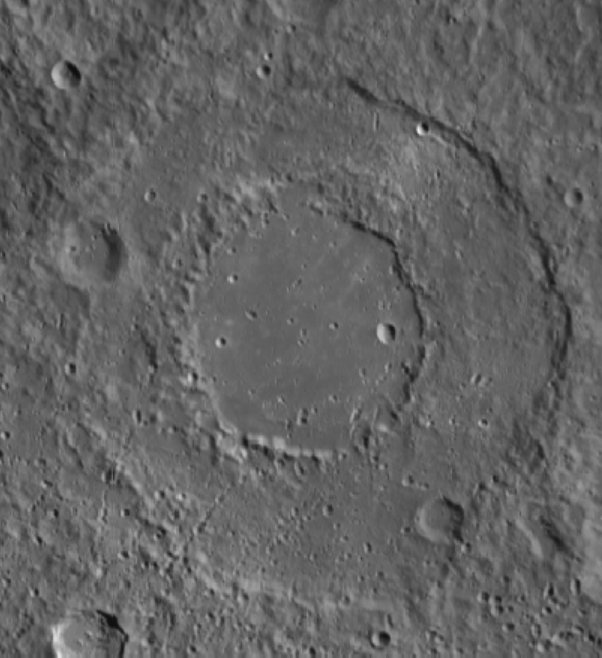
- MESSENGER NAC mosaic of Michelangelo, the namesake of the Michelangelo quadrangle
- Feature type: Peak-ring impact basin
- Location: Michelangelo quadrangle, Mercury
- Coordinates: 44.92°S 109.69°W
- Diameter: 230 km
- Eponym: Michelangelo

Michelangelo is a 230 km diameter impact basin in the Michelangelo quadrangle of Mercury, which is named after this crater. The crater itself was named by the IAU in 1979 after the Italian painter, sculptor and architect Michelangelo.

Michelangelo is one of 110 peak ring basins on Mercury.

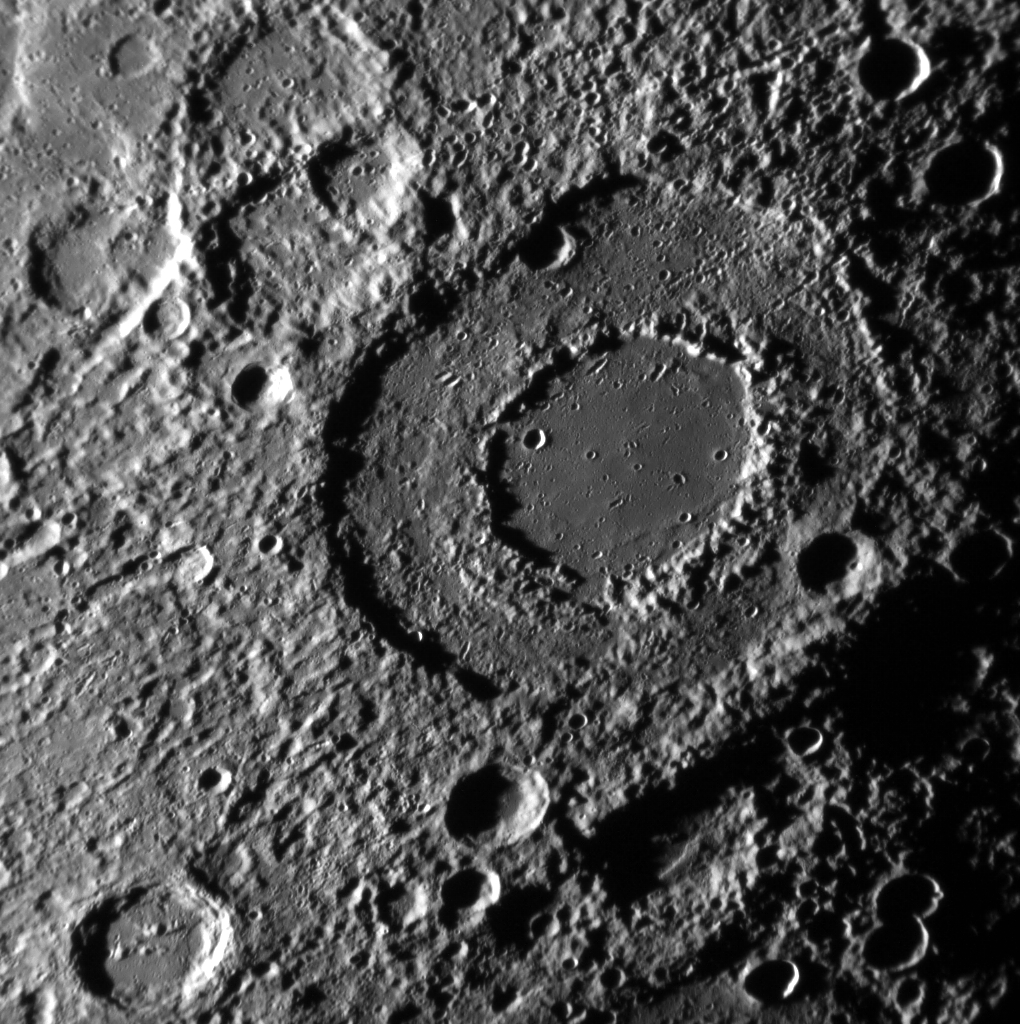
MESSENGER NAC image

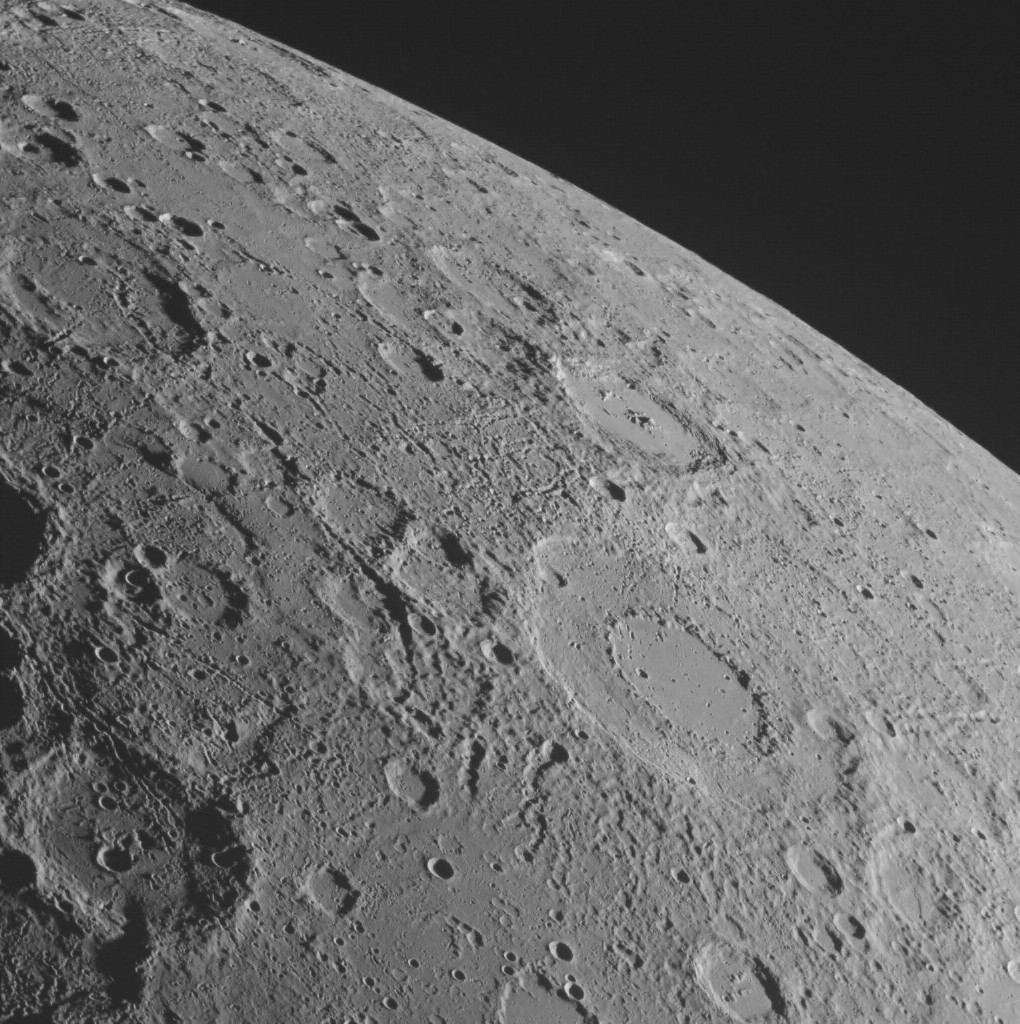
Oblique regional view with Michelangelo in right foreground and Hawthorne right of center
