= Hero Rupes =

Rupes on Mercury

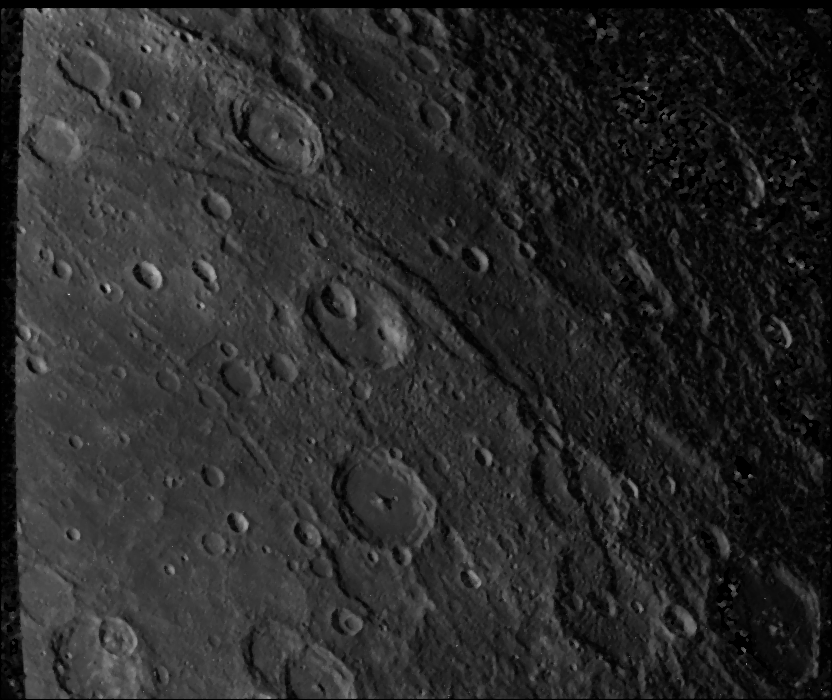
- Feature type: Rupes
- Coordinates: 58.72°S 171.70°W
- Length: 300 km
- Eponym: Hero (sloop)

Hero Rupes is an escarpment on Mercury more than 300 kilometres (190 miles) long located in the southern hemisphere of Mercury, in the southwestern portion of the Michelangelo quadrangle. Discovered by the Mariner 10 spacecraft in 1974, it was formed by a thrust fault, thought to have occurred due to the shrinkage of the planet's core as it cooled over time.

The scarp is named after sloop Hero, Nathaniel Palmer's ship used to explore the Antarctic coast, 1820–21. The name was adopted by the International Astronomical Union in 1976.

== See also ==
- List of escarpments
