= Hawthorne (crater) =

Crater on Mercury

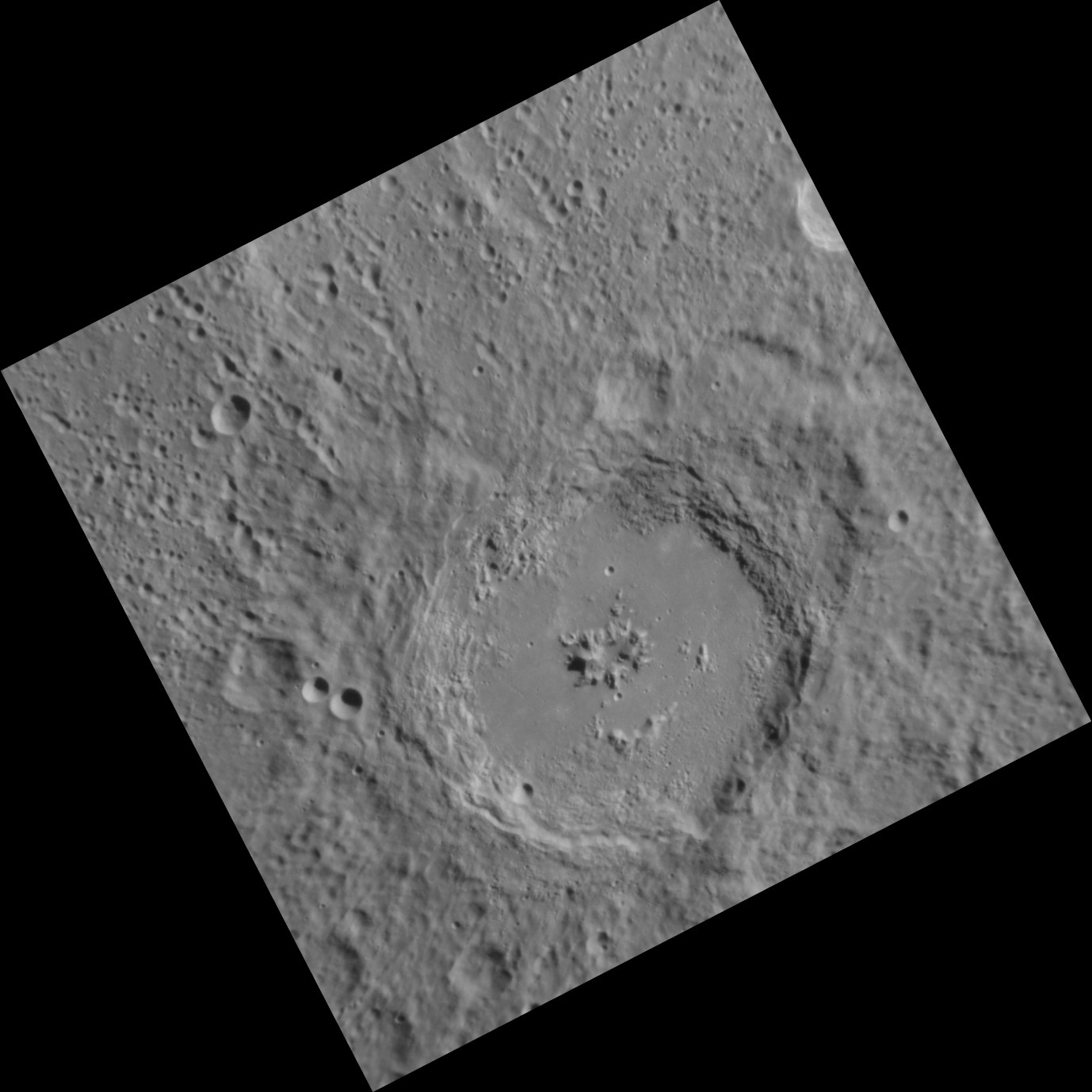
- MESSENGER NAC image of Hawthorne
- Feature type: Central-peak impact crater
- Location: Michelangelo quadrangle, Mercury
- Coordinates: 51.31°S 115.34°W
- Diameter: 120 km (75 mi)
- Eponym: Nathaniel Hawthorne

Hawthorne is a crater on Mercury. It has a diameter of 120 kilometers. Its name was adopted by the International Astronomical Union in 1979. Hawthorne is named for the American novelist Nathaniel Hawthorne, who lived from 1804 to 1864. The crater was first imaged by Mariner 10 in 1974.

The crater Hals is south of Hawthorne. To the northeast is Michelangelo, and to the northwest is Shelley.

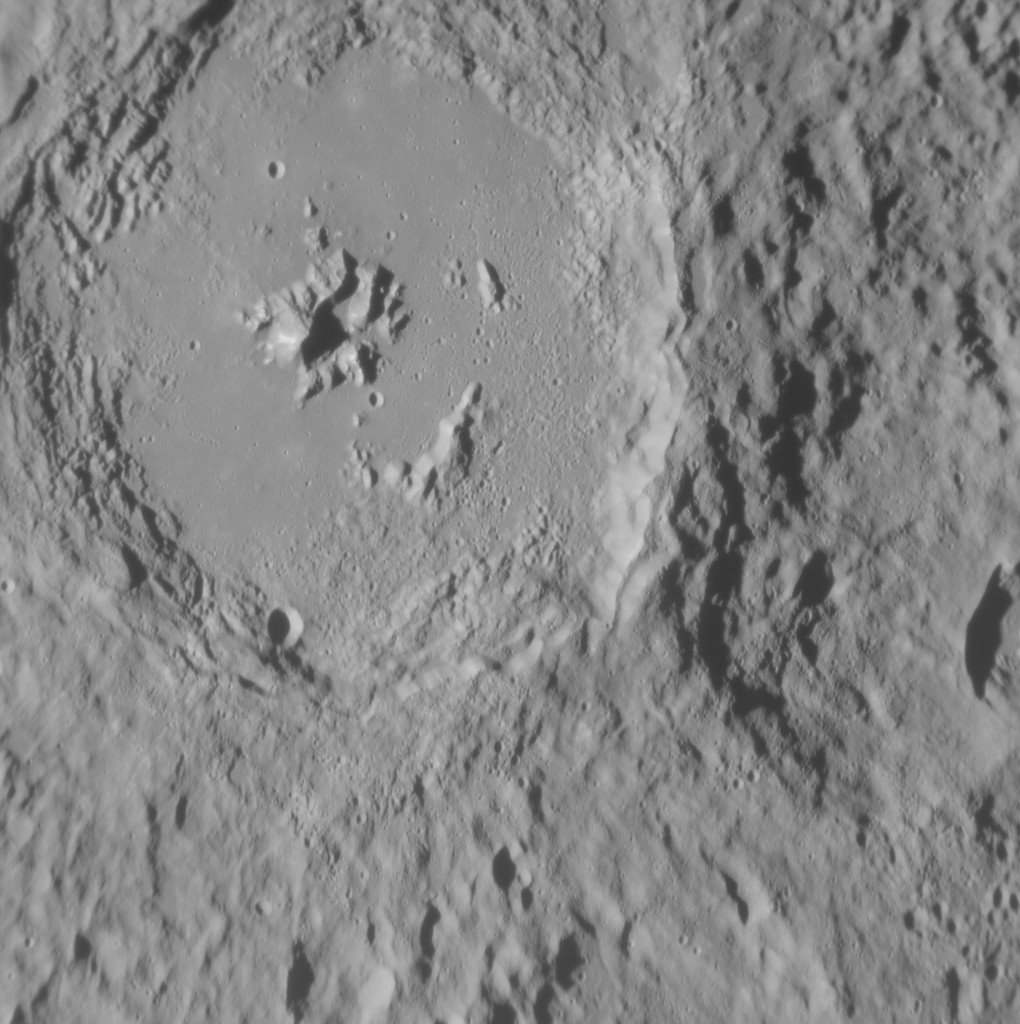
Another MESSENGER NAC image

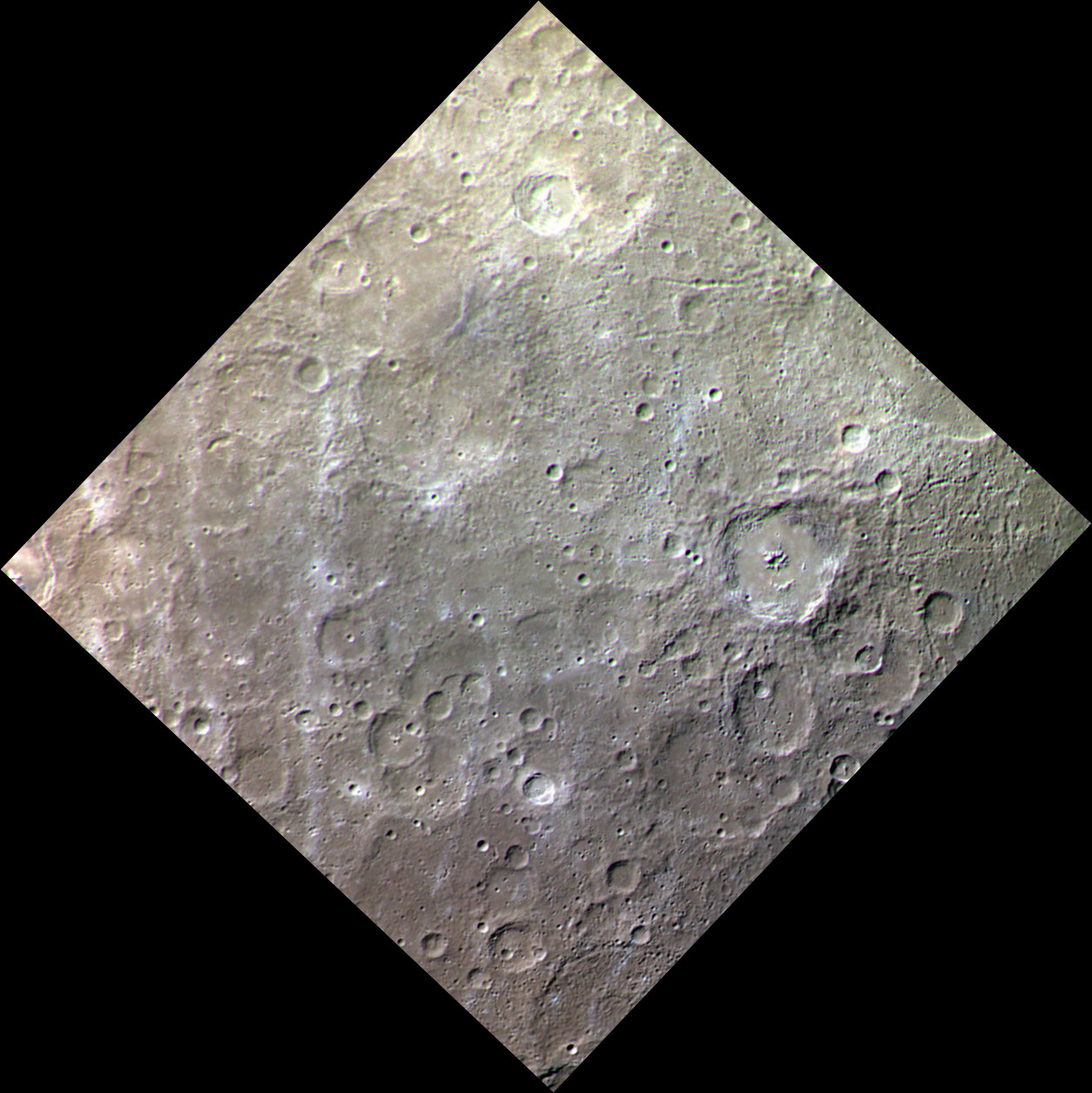
Approximate color image of the surface of Mercury. The prominent crater at right is Hawthorne.

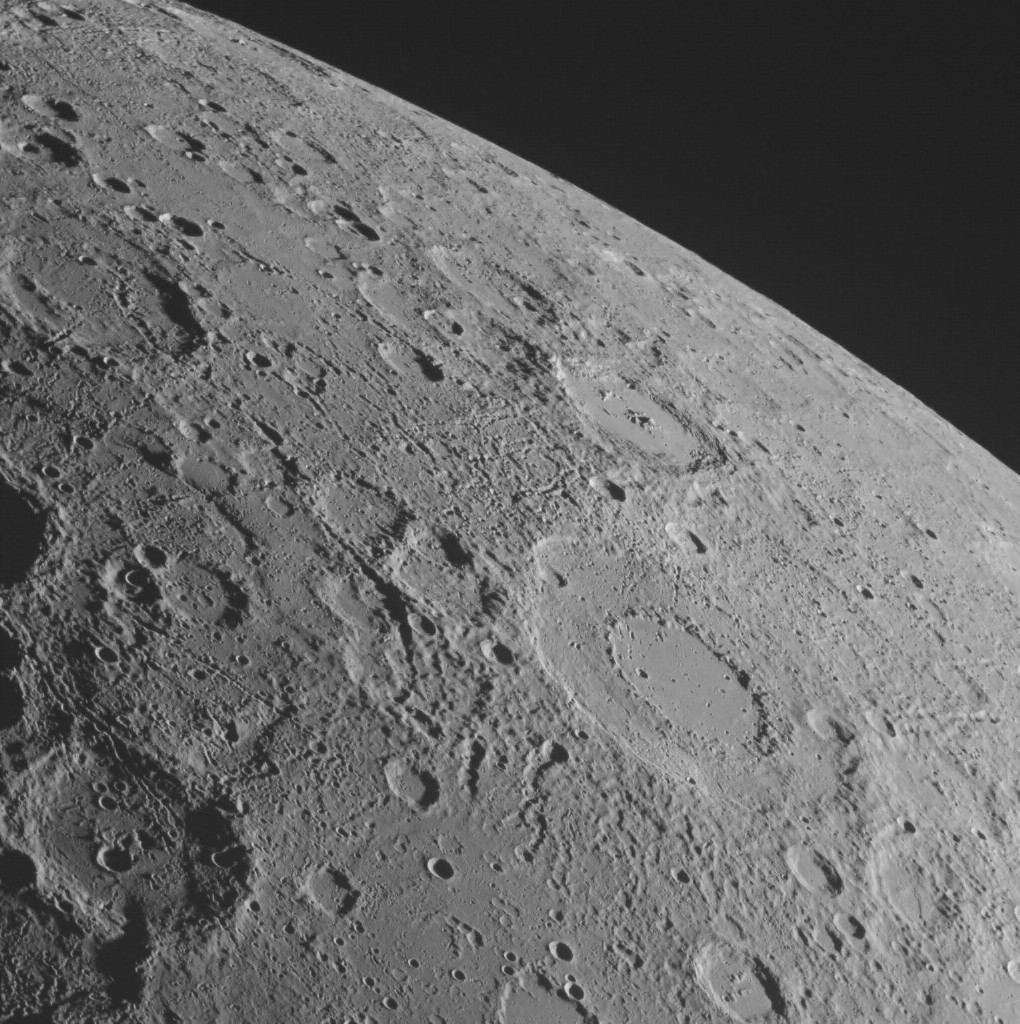
Oblique regional view with Hawthorne right of center and Michelangelo in right foreground
