= Michelangelo quadrangle =

Quadrangle on Mercury

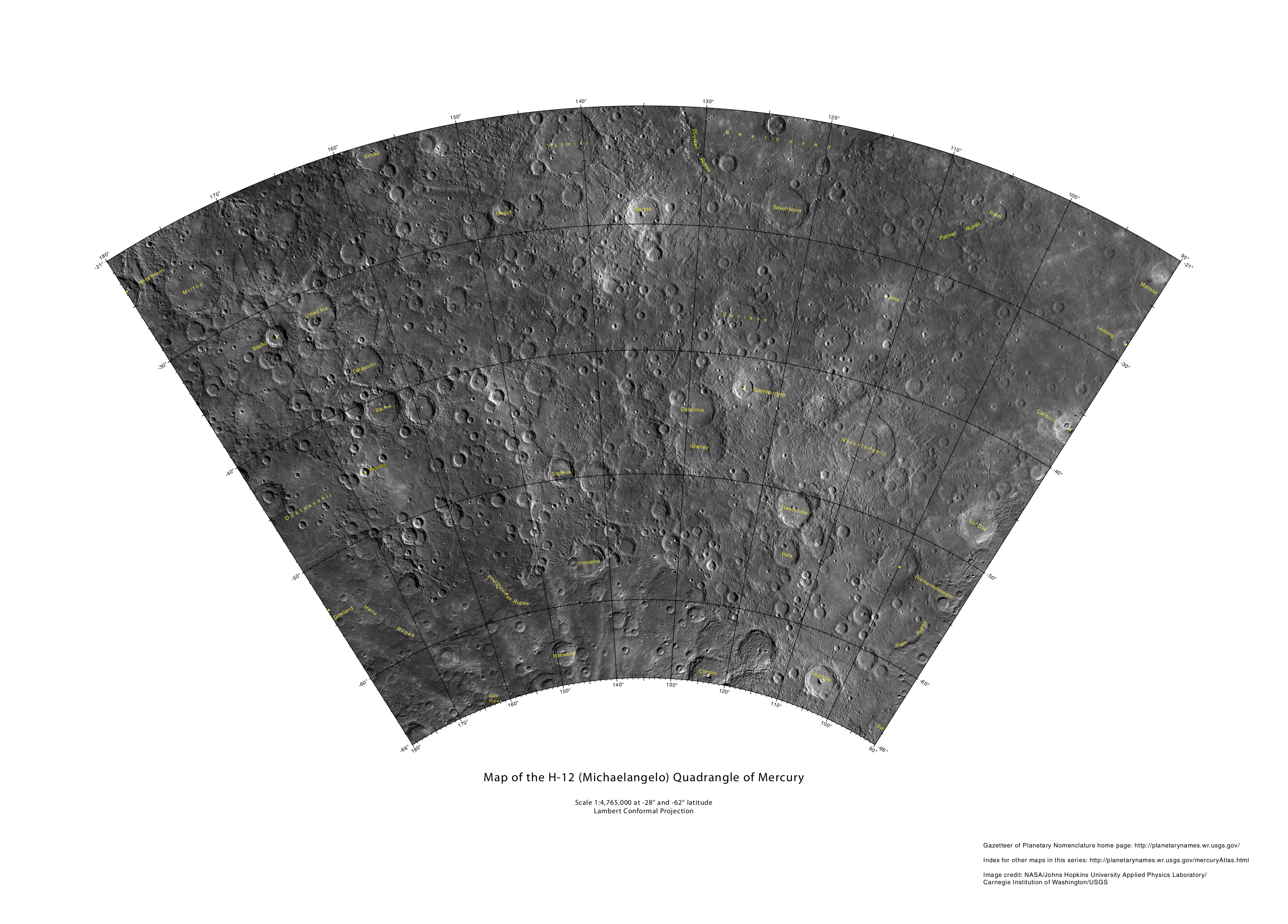
Michelangelo quadrangle as mapped by the MESSENGER spacecraft

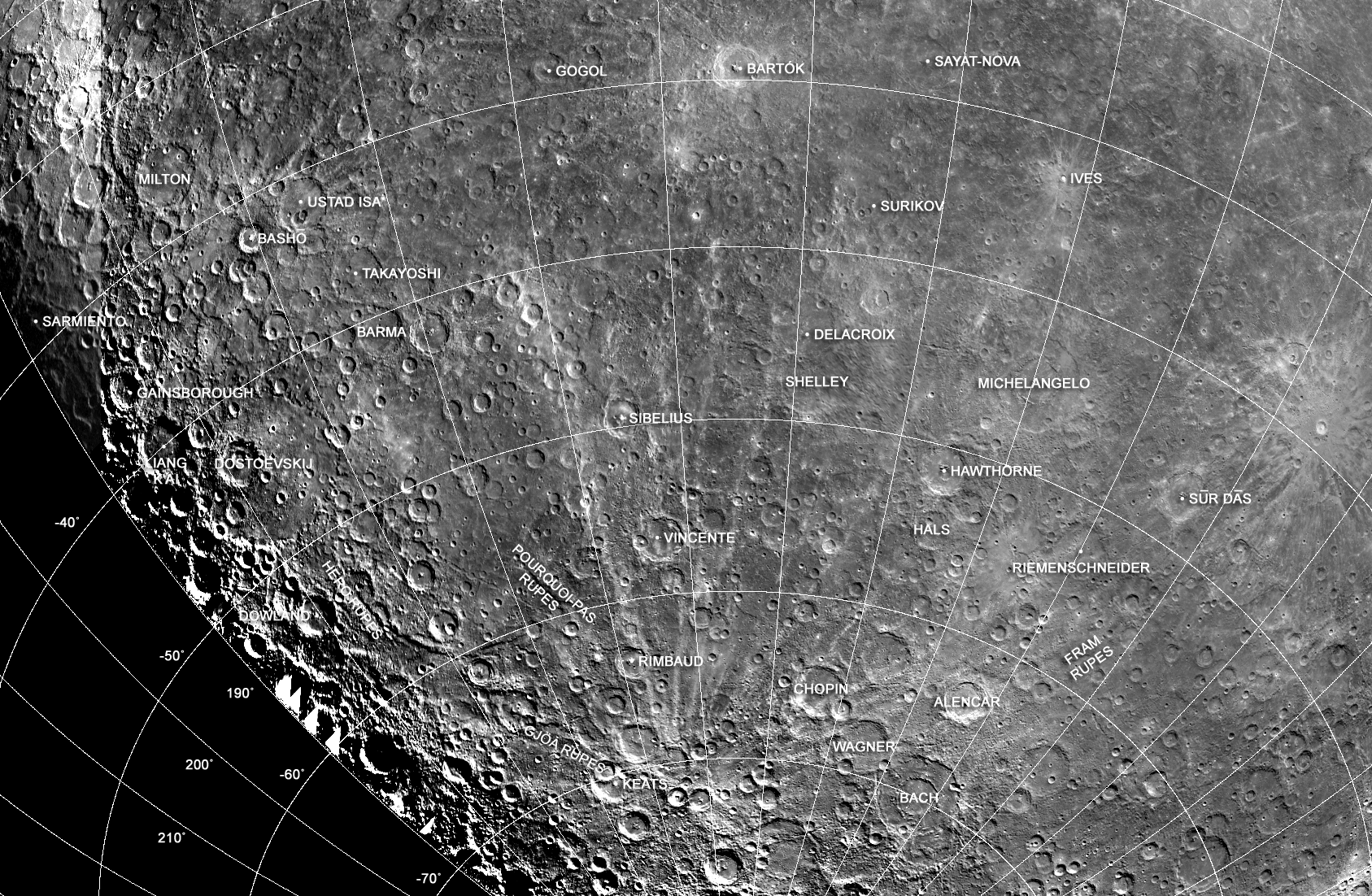
Mariner 10 photomosaic

The Michelangelo quadrangle is in the southern hemisphere of the planet Mercury, where the imaged part is heavily cratered terrain that has been strongly influenced by the presence of multiring basins. At least four such basins, now nearly obliterated, have largely controlled the distribution of plains materials and structural trends in the map area. Many craters, interpreted to be of impact origin, display a spectrum of modification styles and degradation states. The interaction between basins, craters, and plains in this quadrangle provides important clues to geologic processes that have formed the morphology of the mercurian surface.

Several low-albedo features are evident in Earth-based views of the Michelangelo quadrangle, but these features do not appear to correlate directly with any mapped terrain unit. Solitudo Promethei may correspond to a deposit of plains materials centered at –58°, 135°, and Solitudo Martis may correspond to similar materials at –30° to –40°, 90° to 100°. The color data (orange/ultraviolet) presented in Hapke and others (1980) likewise show no particular correlation with mapped terrain types. The "yellow" region (moderately high orange/ultraviolet) centered at –33°, 155° appears to correspond to a smooth plains deposit, but the region overlaps into adjacent cratered terrain.

Mariner 10 data include complete photographic coverage of the quadrangle at a resolution of about 2 km. In addition, twelve stereopairs cover scattered areas in the quadrangle; these photographs were used to supplement the geologic interpretation. About 10° of longitude of the H-13 quadrangle (Solitudo Persephones Province) adjacent to the west is included in the map area because not enough Mariner 10 data were acquired of this quadrangle to justify the production of another map.

The Bach quadrangle is south of Michelangelo quadrangle. To the west is Neruda quadrangle, and to the east is Discovery quadrangle. To the northwest is Tolstoj quadrangle, and to the northeast is Beethoven quadrangle.

== Stratigraphy ==
=== Ancient basin materials ===
Systematic mapping of the Michelangelo quadrangle has revealed the presence of four nearly obliterated multiring basins. These basins are here named for unrelated superposed, named craters, as was done for highly degraded lunar basins (Wilhelms and El-Baz, 1977). From oldest to youngest, the basins are:

Name	Center (lat, long)	Ring diameters (km)				
Name	Center (lat, long)	Inner	Second	Third	Fourth	Fifth
Barma-Vincente	–52°, 162°	360	725	950	1250	1700
Bartok-Ives	–33°, 115°	480	790	1175	1500	
Hawthorne-Riemenschneider	–56°, 105°	270	500	780	1050	
Eitoku-Milton	–23°, 170°	280	590	850	1180	

The presence of these basins is indicated by three criteria: (1) isolated massifs that appear to protrude through superposed materials; (2) arcuate segments of ridges (rupes) aligned with massif material; and (3) arcuate scarps aligned with both massifs and ridges.

Because none of the four basins has ejecta deposits that are preserved, the basins are assumed to be the oldest features in the map area; moreover, they are embayed or buried by all other units. The figures for the relative ages of the basins are based on the density of superposed primary impact craters and stratigraphic relations. These results are uncertain, as the crater density of heavily cratered terrain on Mercury ranges from 11.2 to 17.4 × 10–5 km-2 for craters of diameters 20 km or greater (Guest and Gault, 1976). The results obtained are consistent with a qualitative assignment of relative age that is based on position and size of these ancient basins.

The basins have largely controlled subsequent geologic processes in the map area. Large concentrations of smooth plains deposits are found within the basin boundaries and at the intersections of rings of different basins. Moreover, the trends of scarp segments, interpreted by some workers to be expressions of thrust faults associated with global compression (Dzurisin, 1978), are deflected into basin-concentric patterns at their intersection with basin rings. These relations have also been noted for ancient basins on both the Moon (Schultz, 1976) and Mars (Schultz and others, 1982; Chicarro and others, 1983).

In addition to the four multiring basins, an ancient two-ring basin, Surikov, is also evident at –37°, 125°. It is unique among the two-ring basins in the map area because, although the inner ring is well preserved and similar in morphology to peak rings of fresh basins such as Bach, the outer ring is almost totally obliterated. This morphology is similar to that of the lunar basin Grimaldi and is suggestive of an extended period of structural rejuvenation along the margins of the inner ring. Crater density on this basin suggests that it is one of the oldest in the map area

=== Older plains materials ===
The oldest recognizable plains unit in the map area is the intercrater plains material, originally described by Trask and Guest. This material is generally undulating to hummocky and appears to underlie tracts of cratered terrain, as evidenced by the superposition of many coalescing secondaries from adjacent large craters. In some areas, the intercrater plains material appears to embay c1 craters, and it is found in all of the degraded basins described above. The origin of mercurian intercrater plains material remains unknown. Both volcanic (Strom, 1977) and impact-debris models (Oberbeck and others, 1977) have been proposed. The material is most likely polygenetic, including both crater and basin debris and possibly ancient volcanic flows. Physically and lithologically it resembles the lunar highlands megaregolith.

=== Younger basin materials ===
At least seven basins in or partly in the Michelangelo quadrangle postdate or are contemporaneous with the last stages of deposition of intercrater plains material. Dostoevskij (–44°, 176°) displays only one ring; presumably the inner peak ring is buried by plains material. The ejecta from this basin may be mapped as far as 450 km from the rim; several secondary crater chains occur southeast of the rim. Although Dostoevskij was considered a type example of a c3 large crater (McCauley and others, 1981), crater counts indicate that it is much older. The Dostoevskij impact probably occurred in c1 time.

The Tolstoj Basin is centered in the Tolstoj quadrangle at –16°, 165° (Schaber and McCauley, 1980). It consists of three discontinuous rings; ejecta may be mapped as far as 350 km from the outermost ring. The density of superposed craters suggests an age older than the Caloris Basin, either late c1 or early c2. A small unnamed basin at –48°, 136° may also have formed in this time interval, but its age is uncertain due to its partial burial by ejecta from crater Delacroix (–44°, 129°).

The effects of the Caloris impact on the map area are not immediately apparent. No Caloris ejecta are evident, and most structural trends appear to be unrelated to this impact. However, near the west border of the map are two groups of large, overlapping craters centered at –31°, 183° and –49°, 182°. These groups appear to have formed simultaneously, as no specific stratigraphic sequence is evident. On the basis of crater clusters of similar appearance in the lunar highlands, which have been interpreted as Imbrium and Orientale basin secondaries (Schultz, 1976; Wilhelms, 1976b; Eggleton, 1981), these crater groups are interpreted to be Caloris Basin secondaries. Following the terminology developed by McCauley and others (1981) we have assigned them to the Van Eyck Formation, Secondary-Crater Facies. These secondaries overlie Dostoevskij ejecta and thus confirm that basin as pre-Caloris. We determined a reference crater density for Caloris in the Shakespeare quadrangle in order to correlate basin ages to that stratigraphic datum.

The Beethoven Basin (–20°, 124°), partly exposed in the Michelangelo quadrangle, consists of one ring 660 km in diameter. The exact age of Beethoven is uncertain; the density of superposed primary impact craters suggests a post-Caloris, late c3 age, but it may be as old as early c2 age due to the large range of error in the crater age estimate. The ejecta from Beethoven are very extensive east and southeast of the basin rim and are mappable as far as 600 km downrange from the rim. However, ejecta appear to be almost absent on the west side of the basin. The reason for this asymmetry is unclear; possibly Beethoven is the result of an oblique impact that produced an asymmetric ejecta distribution (Gault and Wedekind, 1978), or possibly basin radial texture in the western rim area has been obliterated by ejecta from Valmiki.

The other basins in the quadrangle are Michelangelo, Valmiki, and Bach. All contain two rings and appear to be transitional between large craters and multiring basins. All postdate the Caloris event.

=== Younger plains materials ===
The oldest of the three younger plains units is intermediate plains material. It forms planar to gently undulating surfaces and both embays tracts of cratered terrain and fills crater floors. Both upper and lower contacts with other plains units are gradational. These gradations suggest that the assignment of age to plains deposits on Mercury is partly dependent on the relative abundance of superposed secondary craters, whose densities vary widely as a function of nearby source craters.

The smooth plains unit forms both widespread regional deposits and crater floor material. The regional deposits are significantly less cratered than those of other plains units, although they typically display crater densities comparable to older lunar maria (Murray and others, 1974). The unit characteristically contains mare-type ridges, although no flow fronts have been observed in the map area.

The origin of the younger plains materials is critical to mercurian geologic history. They are thought to be either volcanic or a facies of ballistic ejecta (Oberbeck and others, 1977). The interpretation favored here is that large parts of these smooth plains are of volcanic origin, because (1) they are distributed regionally and have no obvious source for ballistic deposition; (2) large tracts are confined within basin depositional environments, analogous to the lunar maria; (3) indirect evidence elsewhere on Mercury exists for volcanic modification of impact craters (Schultz, 1977); and (4) possible volcanic collapse craters are associated with plains-filled craters (–61°, 161° and –57°, 102°). Parts of smooth plains deposits may be a complex mix of overlapping crater ejecta.

A very smooth plains unit occurs only as floor material in younger c4 and c5 craters. The material is interpreted to be crater impact melt and associated clastic debris.

=== Crater materials ===
Crater deposits are mapped stratigraphically according to a morphologic degradation sequence devised by N. J. Trask (McCauley and others, 1981). This method assumes that (1) all craters of a given size range initially resemble fresh craters and (2) degrees of impact erosion are constant for all craters within a morphologically defined sequence. Although these conditions hold generally, degradation may be accelerated locally by adjacent impact events and flooding by plains materials and, rarely, may be decelerated by structural rejuvenation of topographic elements of craters. Thus, the stratigraphic significance of crater morphology is only approximate. By analogy with lunar materials, all mapped crater materials are thought to be of impact origin. Only craters larger than 30 km in diameter are mapped.

The large basins of the Michelangelo quadrangle have been dated relatively by counting the cumulative density of superposed primary impact craters that have diameters greater than 20 km. This technique has proven to be of great value in dating lunar basins (Wilhelms, in press), where obvious superposition relations do not exist. Results of these crater counts indicate that Dostoevskij, presumed to be of c3 age (McCauley and others, 1981), is actually one of the oldest basins in the map area (early c1). Thus, strict morphological determination of stratigraphic age may be significantly in error.

Throughout the map area are crater clusters and chains that are satellitic to both craters and basins, but the host crater may not be identifiable everywhere. This material is interpreted to be from secondary impact craters of a wide variety of ages. Many mercurian secondaries are well preserved and have sharp, unrounded rims. This morphology is probably a consequence of the stronger mercurian gravity, relative to the Moon, that produces higher impact velocities for crater ejecta on the mercurian surface (Scott, 1977).

== Structure ==
The rings associated with the four ancient basins are the oldest structures within the mapped area and have to some degree controlled the structural trends of subsequent tectonism. Several of the lobate ridges described by Strom follow arcuate patterns along rings of the Barma-Vincente Basin; Hero Rupes is an example. These lobate ridges appear to be of compressive tectonic origin and, although global in distribution, may be deflected locally by the presence of preexisting, basin-related structure. Additional effects of these ancient basin rings may be seen where the rim of Dostoevskij intersects the Barma-Vincente rings (for example, the horst at –40°, 174°); parts of the Dostoevskij rim appear to have been structurally accented by this intersection. These relations are similar to those associated with highly degraded, ancient basins on Mars (Chicarro and others, 1983). The smooth plains material displays numerous ridges that generally resemble lunar mare ridges and also are considered to be of tectonic origin. The mercurian ridges are probably related to minor compressive stresses that postdate smooth plains emplacement. Numerous lineaments are associated with basin rim material, but most of these lineaments are probably related to ejecta deposition. A few may be faults, particularly where they occur close to preexisting basin rings.

== Geologic history ==
The interpretable geologic history of the Michelangelo quadrangle begins with the formation of the four ancient, multiring basins. From oldest to youngest, they are: Barma-Vincente, Bartok-Ives, Hawthorne-Riemenschneider, and Eitoku-Milton. These basins presumably formed during the period of heavy bombardment inferred from lunar history (Wilhelms, in press). Contemporaneous with their formation and shortly afterward, was the deposition of the intercrater plains material. This unit has a complex history of deposition; it was reworked in place and probably includes brecciated plutonic rocks and possibly ancient volcanic flows. Deposition of the intercrater plains material was waning as the next oldest basins (Dostoevskij, Tolstoj) were formed. Partly overlapping their formation was the deposition of the intermediate plains material, probably emplaced partly as distal basin ejecta and partly as volcanic flows. Regional deformation of these plains units by compressive tectonics, forming scarps, was contemporaneous with their deposition.

The Caloris impact occurred during the time of formation of the intermediate plains material. In the map area, Caloris ejecta may be present at depth or may have been reworked locally by adjacent impacts. Two groups of Caloris secondary craters are evident. Shortly after the Caloris impact, extensive smooth plains material, probably of volcanic origin, was deposited. During this period of deposition occurred the impacts of the last of the major basins (Beethoven, Michelangelo, Valmiki, and Bach). Minor tectonic activity continued as scarps and lunar mare-type wrinkle ridges developed within the smooth plains materials.

The cratering rate declined rapidly as the c3, c4 and c5 craters were produced. Regolith production continues to the present day on all units. If the geologic history of the Moon is a guide, most of the events discussed were essentially complete within the first 1.5 to 2.0 billion years of Mercury's history (Murray and others, 1975). A summary of global mercurian geology may be found in Guest and O'Donnell (1977) and Strom.

== Sources ==
- Spudis, Paul D.; James G. Prosser (1984). "Geologic Map Of The Michaelangelo (H-12) Quadrangle Of Mercury" (PDF). Prepared for the National Aeronautics and Space Administration by the U.S. Department of the Interior, U.S. Geological Survey. Published in hardcopy as USGS Miscellaneous Investigations Series Map I–1659, as part of the Atlas of Mercury, 1:5,000,000 Geologic Series. Hardcopy is available for sale from U.S. Geological Survey, Information Services, Box 25286, Federal Center, Denver, CO 80225

== Bibliography ==
- Chicarro, Augustin, Schultz, P. H., and Masson, Philippe, 1983, Basin control of ridge patterns on Mars: Abstracts of papers submitted to the Lunar and Planetary Science Conference, 14th, Houston, 1983, p. 105–106.
- Dzurisin, Daniel, 1978, The tectonic and volcanic history of Mercury as inferred from studies of scarps, ridges, troughs, and other lineaments: Journal of Geophysical Research, v. 83, no. B10, p. 4883–4906.
- Eggleton, R. E., 1981, Map of the impact geology of the Imbrium basin of the Moon, in Geology of the Apollo 16 area—Central Lunar Highlands: U.S. Geological Survey Professional Paper 1048, pl. 12.
- Gault, D. E., and Wedekind, J. A., 1978, Experimental studies of oblique impact: Lunar and Planetary Science Conference, 9th, Houston, 1978, Proceedings, v. 3, p. 3843– 3875.
- Guest, J. E., and Gault, D. E., 1976, Crater populations in the early history of Mercury: Geophysical Research Letters, v. 3, no. 3, p. 121–123.
- Guest, J. E., and O'Donnell, W. P., 1977, Surface history of Mercury: A review: Vistas in Astronomy, v. 20, p. 273–300.
- Hapke, Bruce, Christman, Craig, Rava, Barry, and Mosher, Joel, 1980, A color-ratio map of Mercury: Lunar and Planetary Science Conference, 11th, Houston, 1980, Proceedings, v. 1, p. 817–821.
- McCauley, J. F., Guest, J. E., Schaber, G. G., Trask, N. J., and Greeley, Ronald, 1981, Stratigraphy of the Caloris Basin, Mercury: Icarus, v. 47, no. 2, p. 184–202.
- Murray, B. C., Belton, M. J. S., Danielson, G. E., Davies, M. E., Gault, D. E., Hapke, Bruce, O'Leary, Brian, Strom, R. G., Suomi, Verner, and Trask, N. J., 1974, Mercury's surface: Preliminary description and interpretation from Mariner 10 pictures: Science, v. 185, no. 4146, p. 169–179.
- Murray, B. C., Strom, R. G., Trask, N. J., and Gault, D. E., 1975, Surface history of Mercury: Implications for terrestrial planets: Journal of Geophysical Research, v. 80, no. 17, p. 2508–2514.
- Oberbeck, V. R., Quaide, W. L., Arvidson, R. E., and Aggarwal, H. R., 1977, Comparative studies of lunar, martian, and mercurian craters and plains: Journal of Geophysical Research, v. 82, no. 11, p. 1681–1698.
- Schaber, G. G., and McCauley, J.F., 1980, Geologic map of the Tolstoj quadrangle of Mercury: U.S. Geological Survey Miscellaneous Investigations Series Map I-1199, scale 1:5,000,000.
- Schultz, P. H., 1976, Moon morphology: Austin, Tex., University of Texas Press, 626 p.
- ______1977, Endogenic modification of impact craters on Mercury: Physics of the Earth and Planetary Interiors, v. 15, nos. 2–3, p. 202–219.
- Schultz, P. H, Schultz, R. A., and Rogers, John, 1982, The structure and evolution of ancient impact basins on Mars: Journal of Geophysical Research, v. 87, no. 12, p. 9803–9820.
- Scott, D. H., 1977, Moon-Mercury: Relative preservation states of secondary craters: Physics of the Earth and Planetary Interiors, v. 15, nos. 2–3, p. 173–178.
- Strom, R. G., 1977, Origin and relative age of lunar and mercurian intercrater plains: Physics of the Earth and Planetary Interiors, v. 15, nos. 2–3, p. 156–172.
- Wilhelms, D. E., 1976b, Secondary impact craters of lunar basins: Lunar Science Conference, 7th, Houston, 1976, Proceedings, v. 3, p. 2883–2901.
- ______The geologic history of the Moon: U.S Geological Survey Professional Paper 1348 (in press). Wilhelms, D. E., and El-Baz, Farouk, 1977, Geologic map of the east side of the Moon: U.S. Geological Survey Miscellaneous Investigations Series Map I-948, scale 1:5,000,000

H-1 Borealis (features)
H-5 Hokusai (features)	H-4 Raditladi (features)	H-3 Shakespeare (features)		H-2 Victoria (features)
H-10 Derain (features)	H-9 Eminescu (features)	H-8 Tolstoj (features)	H-7 Beethoven (features)	H-6 Kuiper (features)
H-14 Debussy (features)	H-13 Neruda (features)	H-12 Michelangelo (features)		H-11 Discovery (features)
H-15 Bach (features)
