= Vālmiki (crater) =

Crater on Mercury

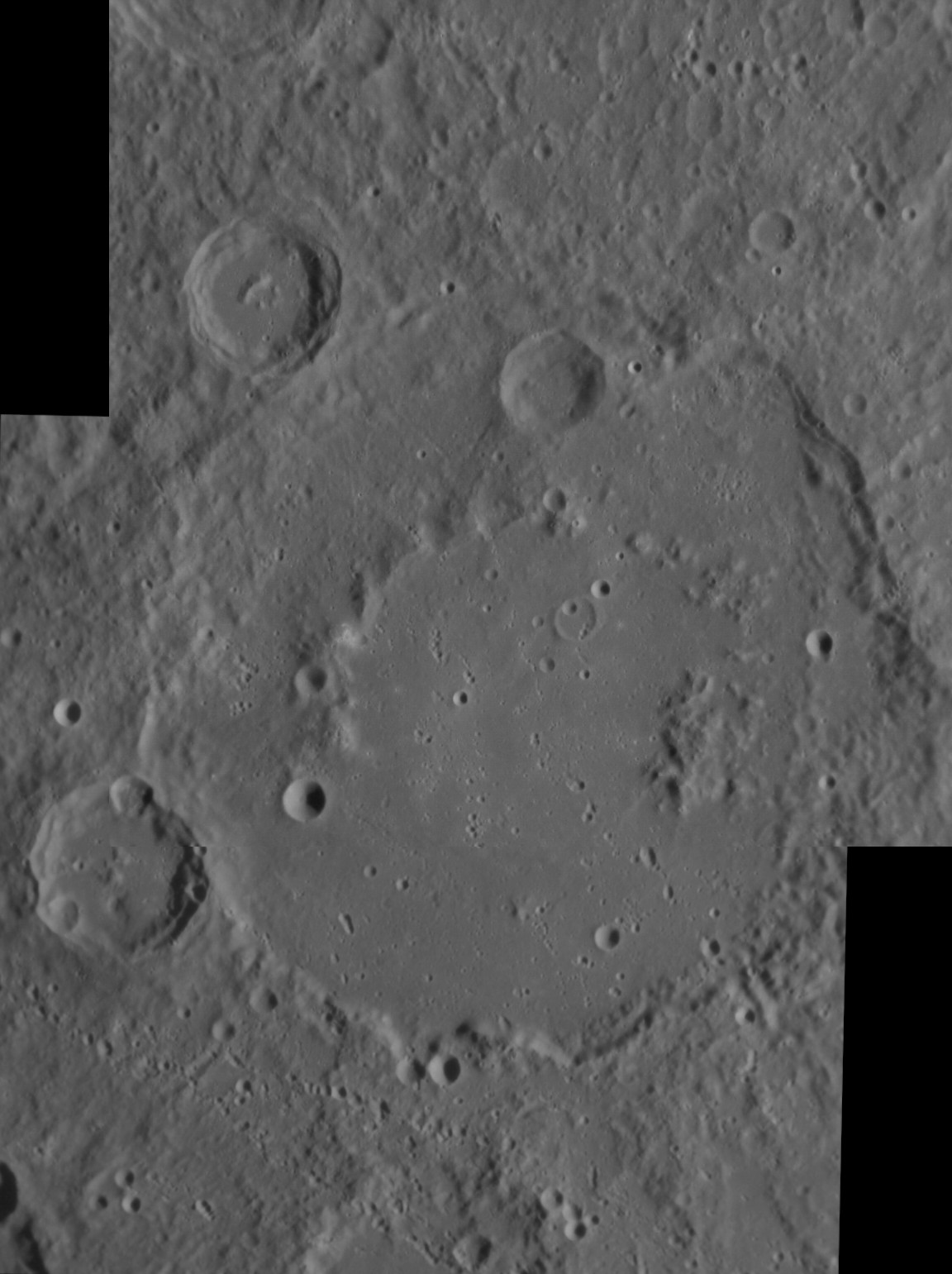
- MESSENGER NAC mosaic
- Planet: Mercury
- Coordinates: 23.58°S 141.41°W
- Quadrangle: Michelangelo
- Diameter: 210 km (130 mi)
- Eponym: Valmiki

Vālmiki is a crater on Mercury. Its name was adopted by the International Astronomical Union (IAU) in 1976. It is named for the Indian poet Valmiki.

Vālmiki is one of 110 peak ring basins on Mercury.

Vālmiki is located between the ancient, large craters Tolstoj (to the west) and Beethoven (to the east). To the southwest is Gogol, and to the southeast is Bartók.

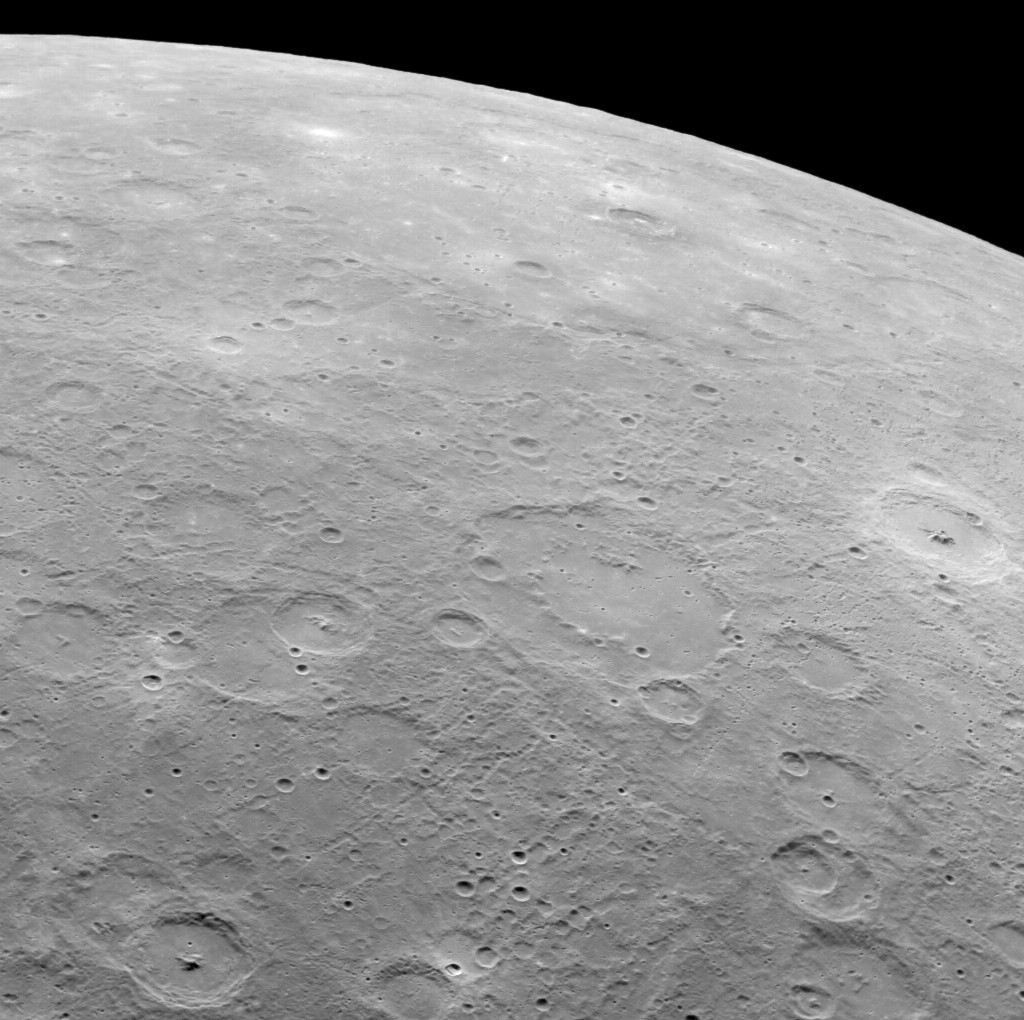
Vālmiki at center with Beethoven in the background

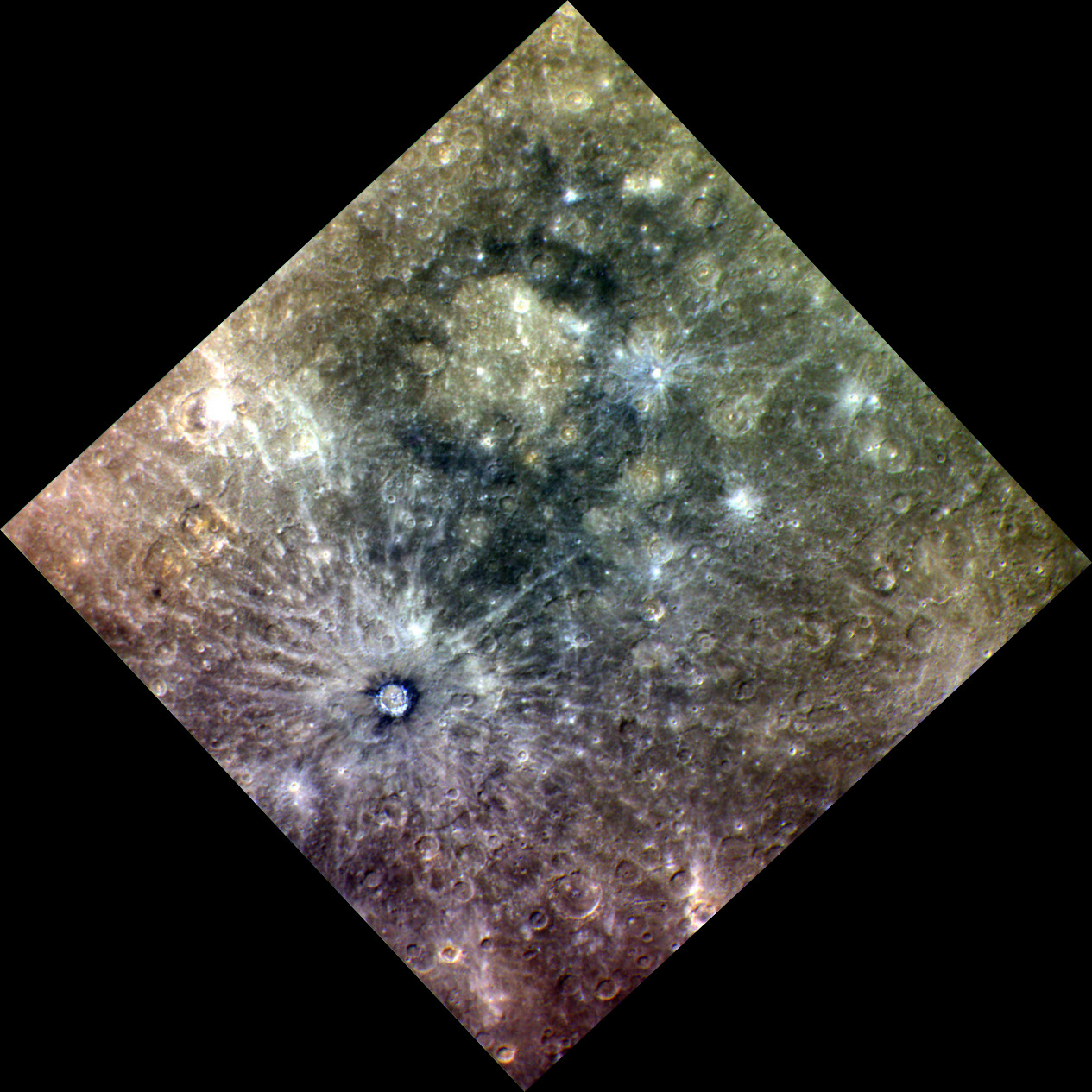
Enhanced color image of Tolstoj crater (top center) and Bashō crater (lower left), with Vālmiki in the right corner.
