= Valmiki (disambiguation) =

Valmiki is celebrated as the harbinger-poet in Sanskrit literature. He is revered in Valmikism and associated with the Valmiki caste.

Valmiki or Vaalmiki may also refer to:

- Vālmiki (crater), crater on Mercury, named after the poet
- Valmiki caste, a large cluster of castes and local groups in the Indian subcontinent
- Valmiki (1946 film), an Indian Tamil-language film
- Valmiki (1963 Kannada film), an Indian Kannada-language film
- Valmiki (1963 Telugu film), an Indian Telugu-language Hindu mythological film by C. S. Rao
- Valmiki (2005 film), an Indian Kannada-language drama film
- Vaalmiki (film), 2009 Indian Tamil-language film by G. Anantha Narayanan
- Valmiki (2019 film), the initial title of the 2019 Indian film Gaddalakonda Ganesh
