= Rublev (crater) =

Crater on Mercury

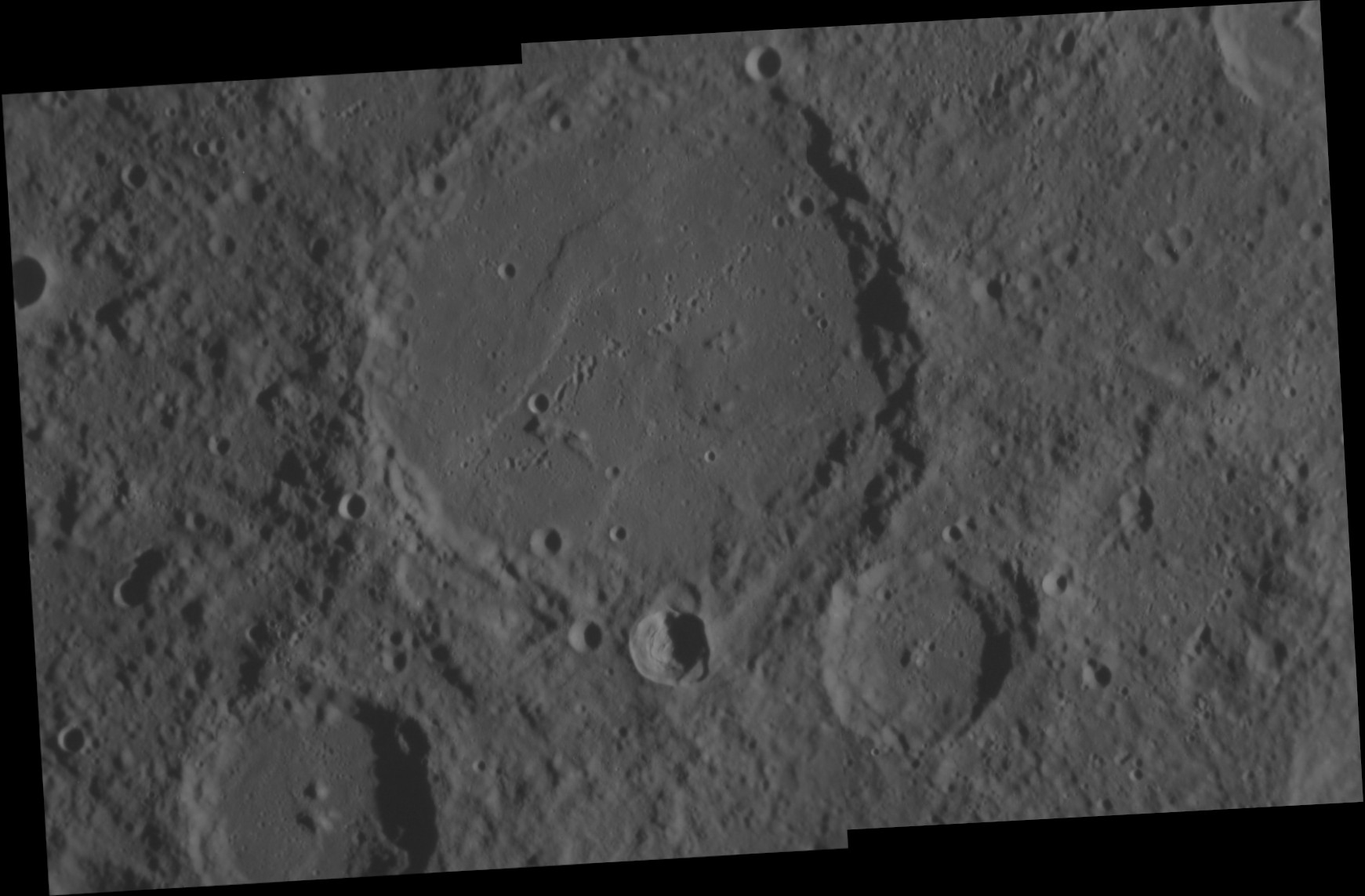
- MESSENGER NAC mosaic
- Planet: Mercury
- Coordinates: 15.12°S 157.08°W
- Quadrangle: Tolstoj
- Diameter: 129.0 km (80.2 mi)
- Eponym: Andrei Rublev

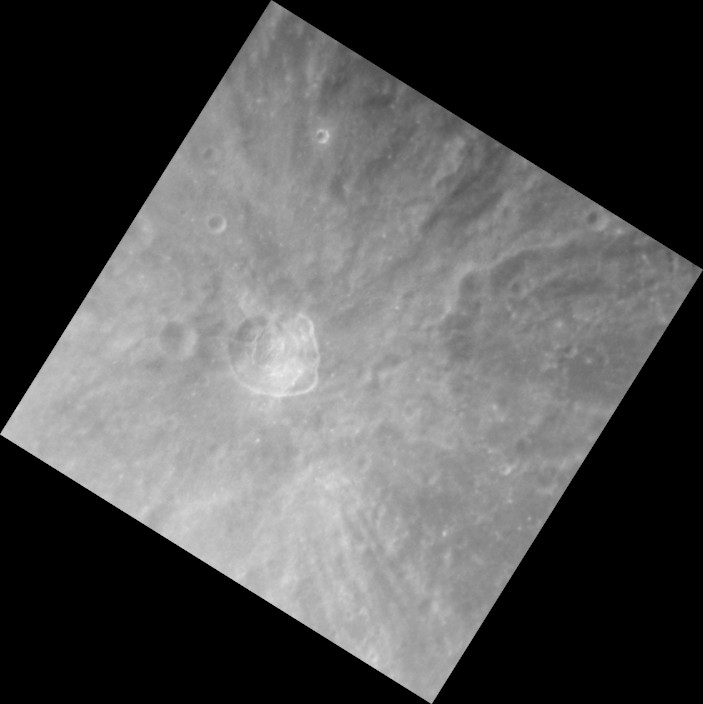
Crater with ray system on rim of Rublev crater

Rublev is a crater on Mercury. Its name was adopted by the International Astronomical Union (IAU) in 1976. Rublev is named for the Russian painter Andrei Rublev.

Rublev is located east of the large and stratigraphically important Tolstoj basin, and overlies its ejecta blanket.

An unnamed crater with a bright ray system lies on the south rim of Rublev.

Due south of Rublev is the crater Eitoku.
