= Eitoku (crater) =

Crater on Mercury

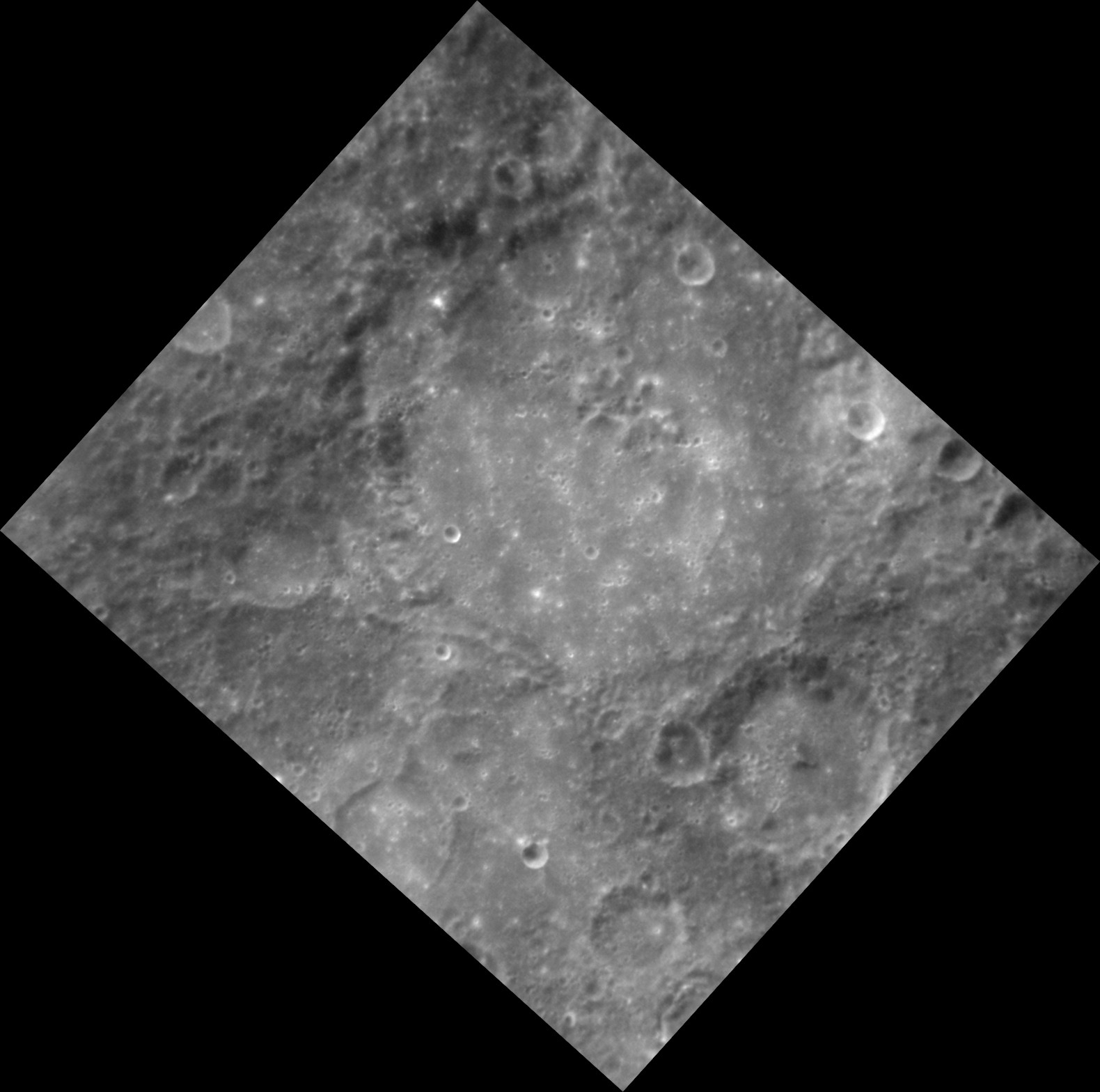
- MESSENGER NAC
- Feature type: Impact crater
- Location: Michelangelo quadrangle, Mercury
- Coordinates: 21.80°S 157.18°W
- Diameter: 101.0 km (62.8 mi)
- Eponym: Kanō Eitoku

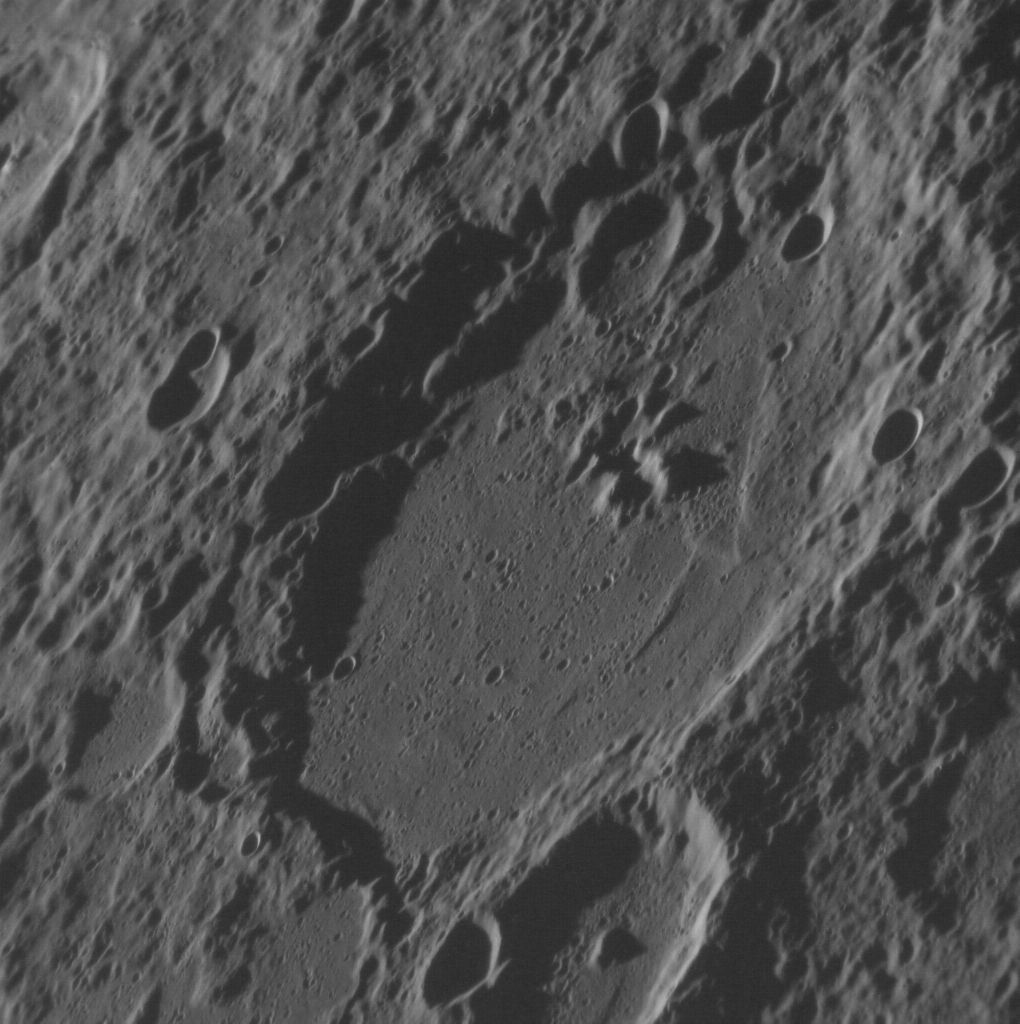
Oblique view

Eitoku is a crater on Mercury. It has a diameter of 101 kilometers. Its name was adopted by the International Astronomical Union in 1976. Eitoku is named for the Japanese artist Kanō Eitoku, who lived from 1543 to 1590.

Irregular depressions lie within the central peak complex on the floor of the crater. The depressions may be evidence of explosive volcanism.

Eitoku is due south of the crater Rublev, which is itself east of the large crater Tolstoj. Lucena crater is to the south of Eitoku.
