= Lucena (crater) =

Crater on Mercury

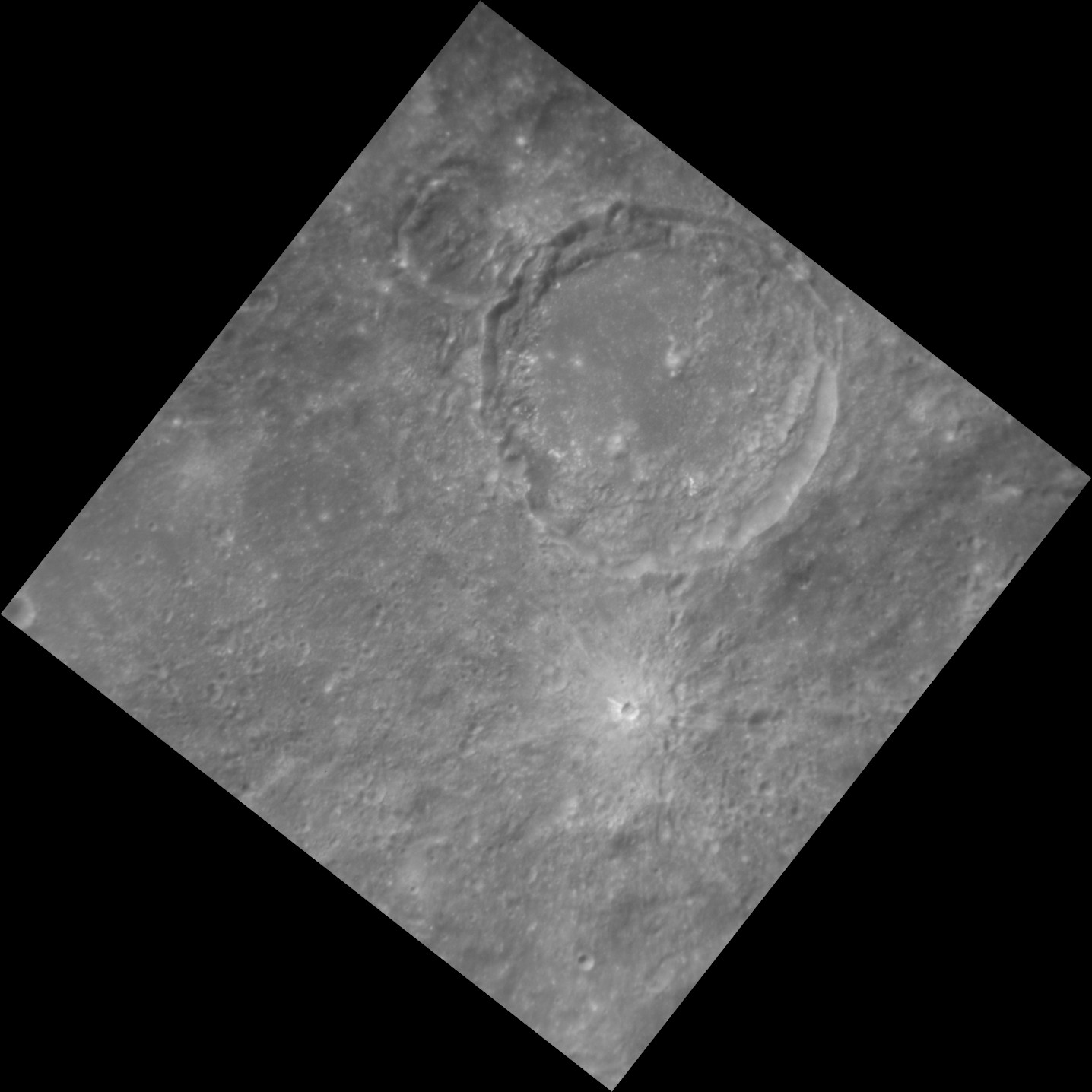
- MESSENGER NAC
- Planet: Mercury
- Coordinates: 25.21°S 156.10°W
- Quadrangle: Michelangelo
- Diameter: 52.0 km (32.3 mi)
- Eponym: Clemencia Lucena

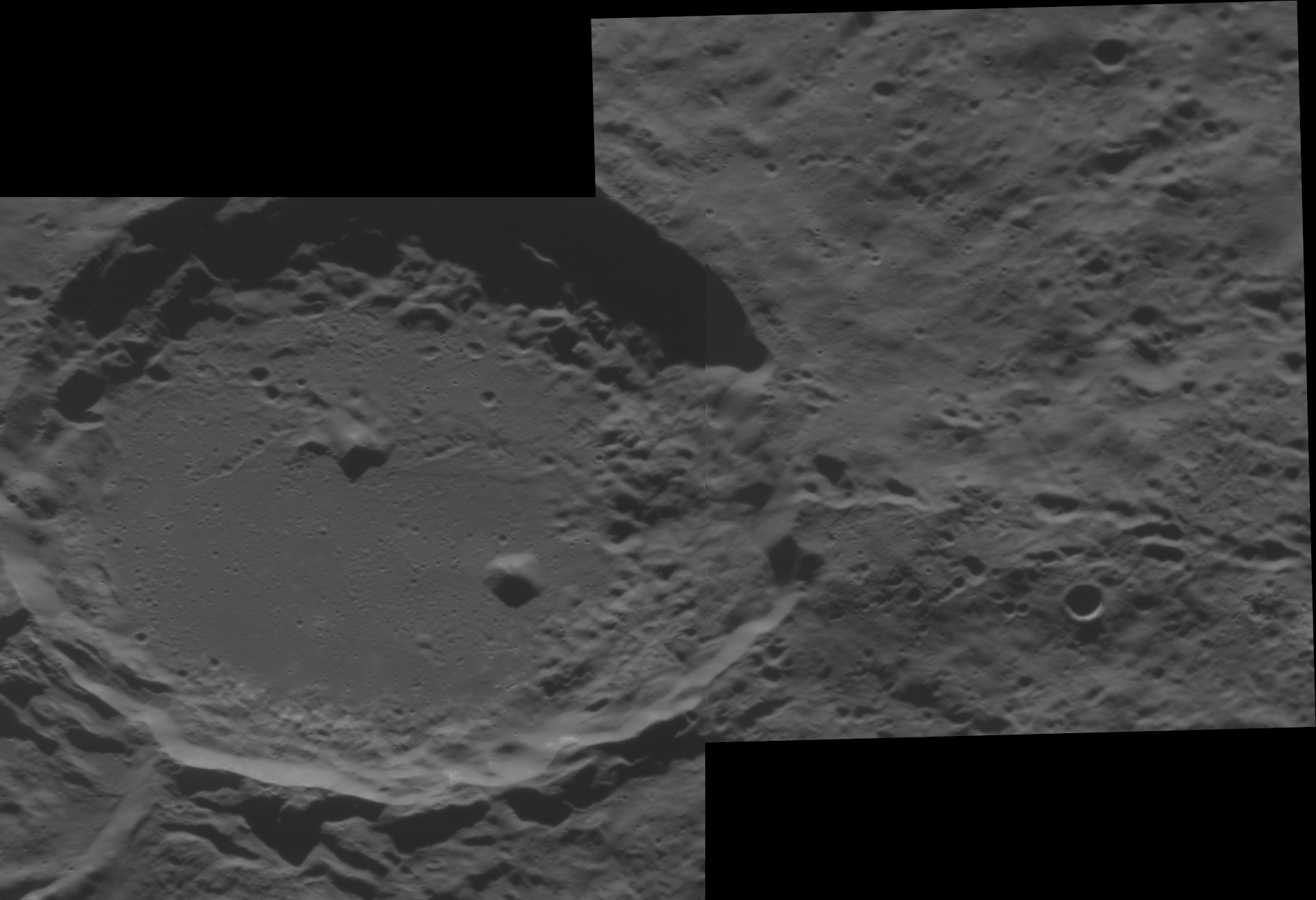
Oblique view

Lucena is a crater on Mercury. Its name was adopted by the International Astronomical Union (IAU) on February 7, 2025. The crater is named for Colombian painter Clemencia Lucena.

Lucena is to the south of the crater Eitoku.
