= Sayat-Nova (crater) =

Crater on Mercury

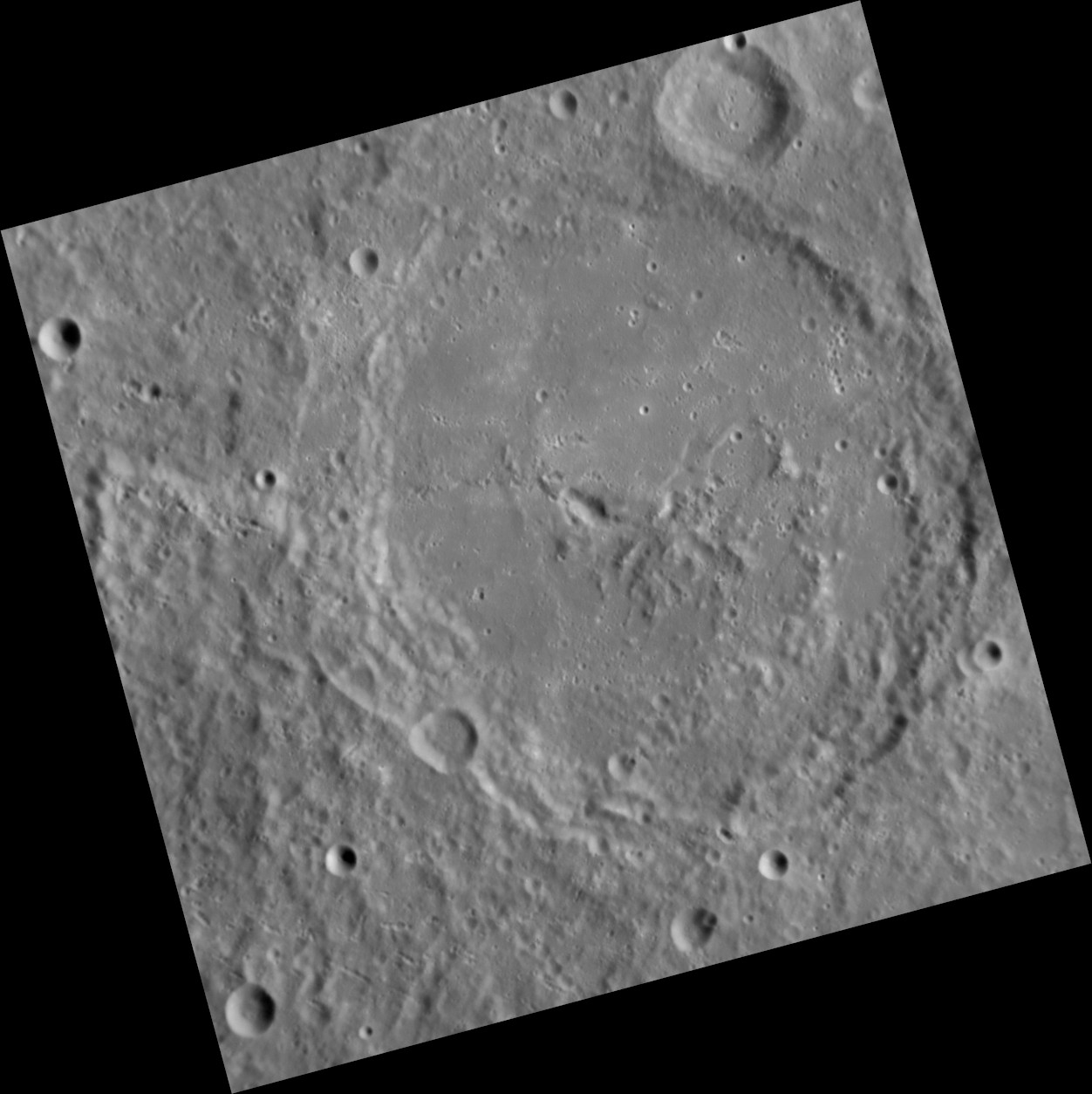
- MESSENGER NAC
- Planet: Mercury
- Coordinates: 27.98°S 122.7°W
- Quadrangle: Michelangelo
- Diameter: 146 km (91 mi)
- Eponym: Sayat-Nova

Sayat-Nova is an impact crater on the planet Mercury. It is named for the Armenian/Georgian song writer Aruthin Sayadian Sayat-Nova. Its name was approved by the International Astronomical Union in 1979. The crater was first imaged by Mariner 10 in 1974.

Sayat-Nova is located on the southern rim of the larger Beethoven basin. A scarp cutting east-west across Sayat-Nova corresponds with the original rim of Beethoven.
