= Bashō (crater) =

Crater on Mercury

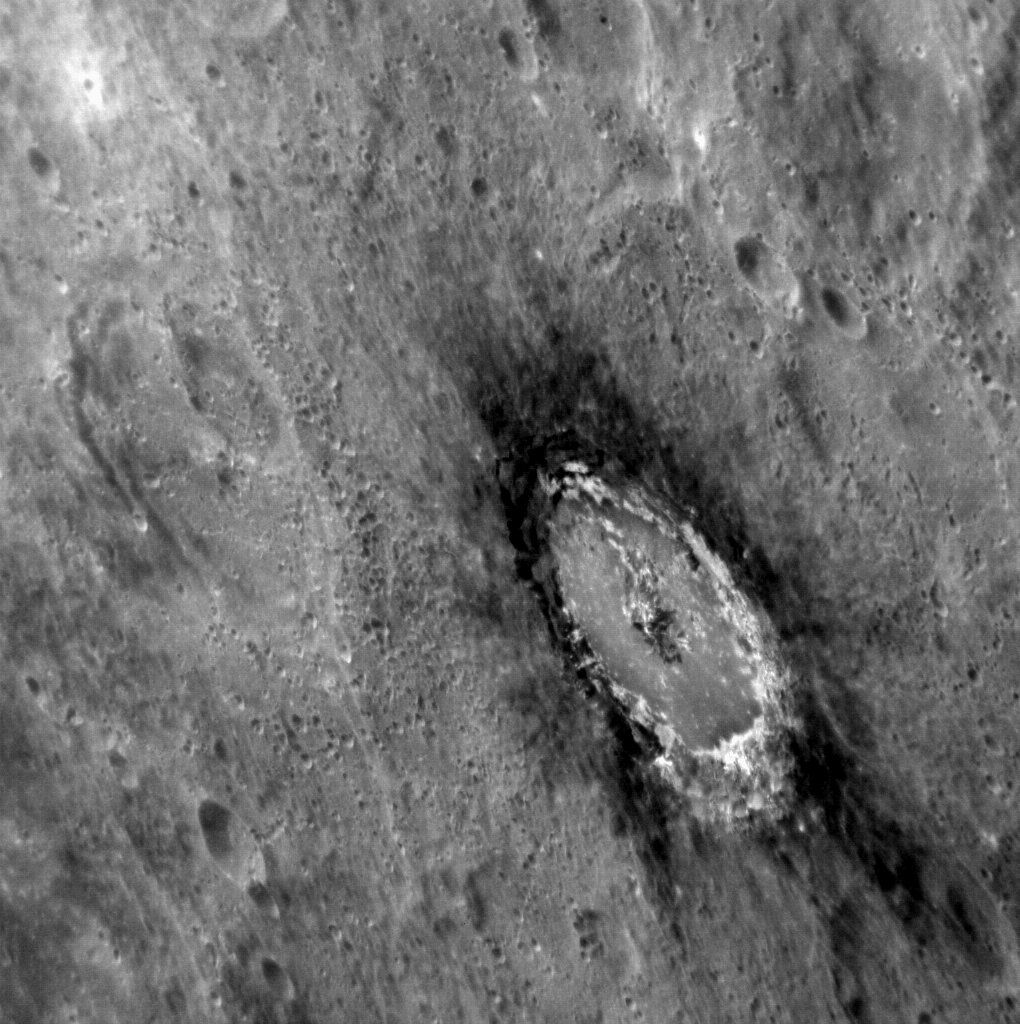
- MESSENGER image
- Feature type: Impact crater
- Location: Michelangelo quadrangle, Mercury
- Coordinates: 32.4°S 170.36°W
- Diameter: 74.62 km (46.37 mi)
- Eponym: Matsuo Bashō

Bashō is a crater on Mercury named after Matsuo Bashō, a 17th-century Japanese writer. Bashō crater is only 74.62 kilometers (46.37 mi) in diameter, but is a prominent feature on Mercury's surface, due to its bright rays. Photographs from NASA's Mariner 10 and MESSENGER spacecraft show a curious halo of dark material around the crater. The dark material is typically referred to as low-reflectance material (LRM) and there is evidence that it is caused by graphite.

Bashō is one of the largest craters of the Kuiperian system on Mercury. The largest is Bartók crater.

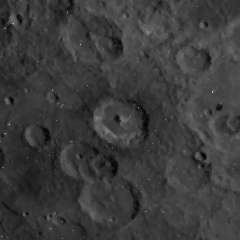
Mariner 10 image

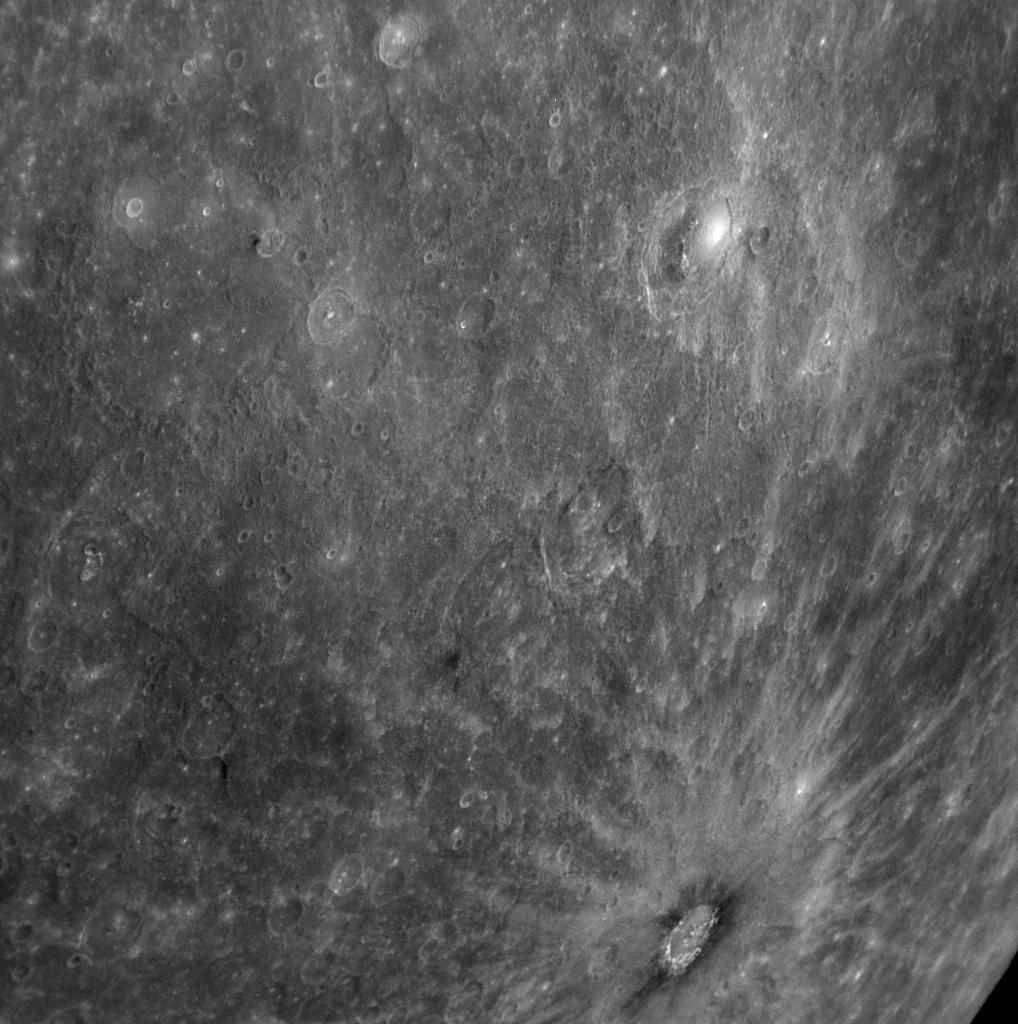
Image from MESSENGER's first flyby in January 2008

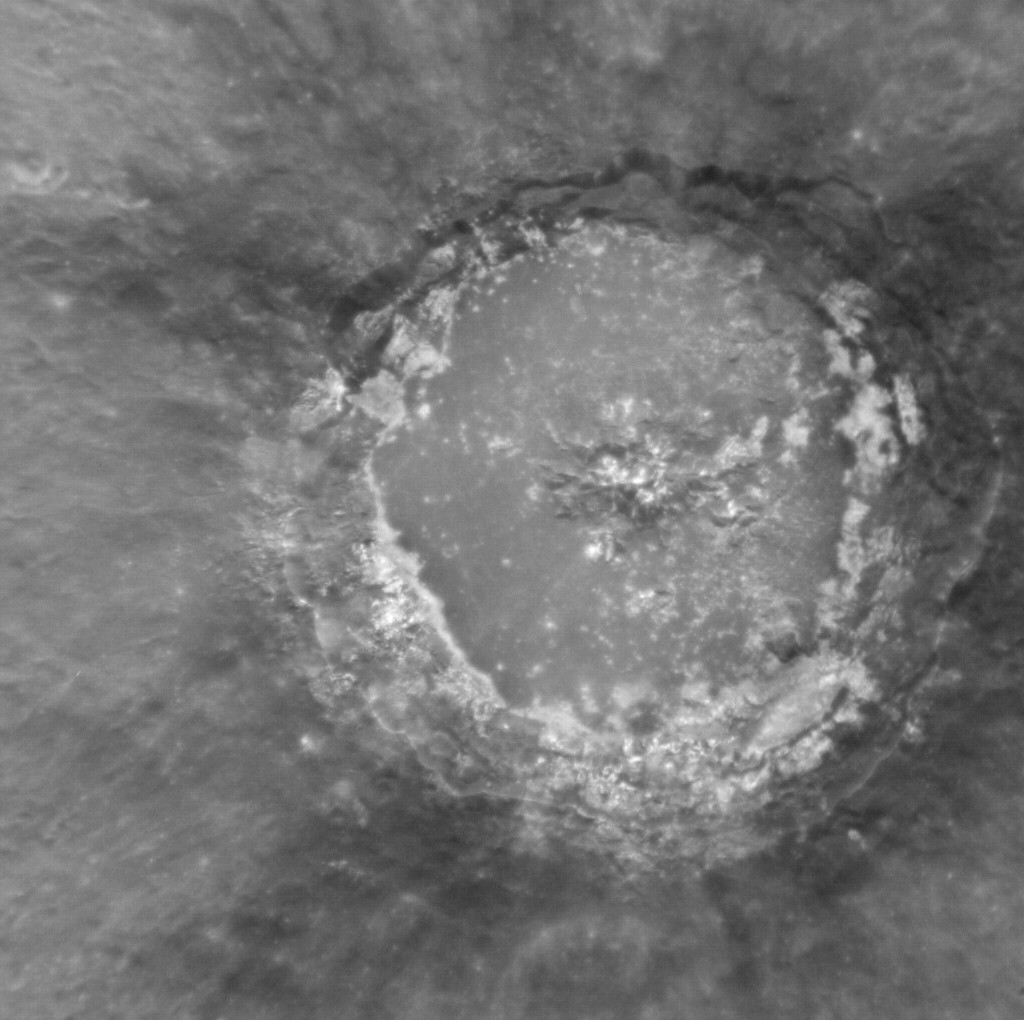
MESSENGER image

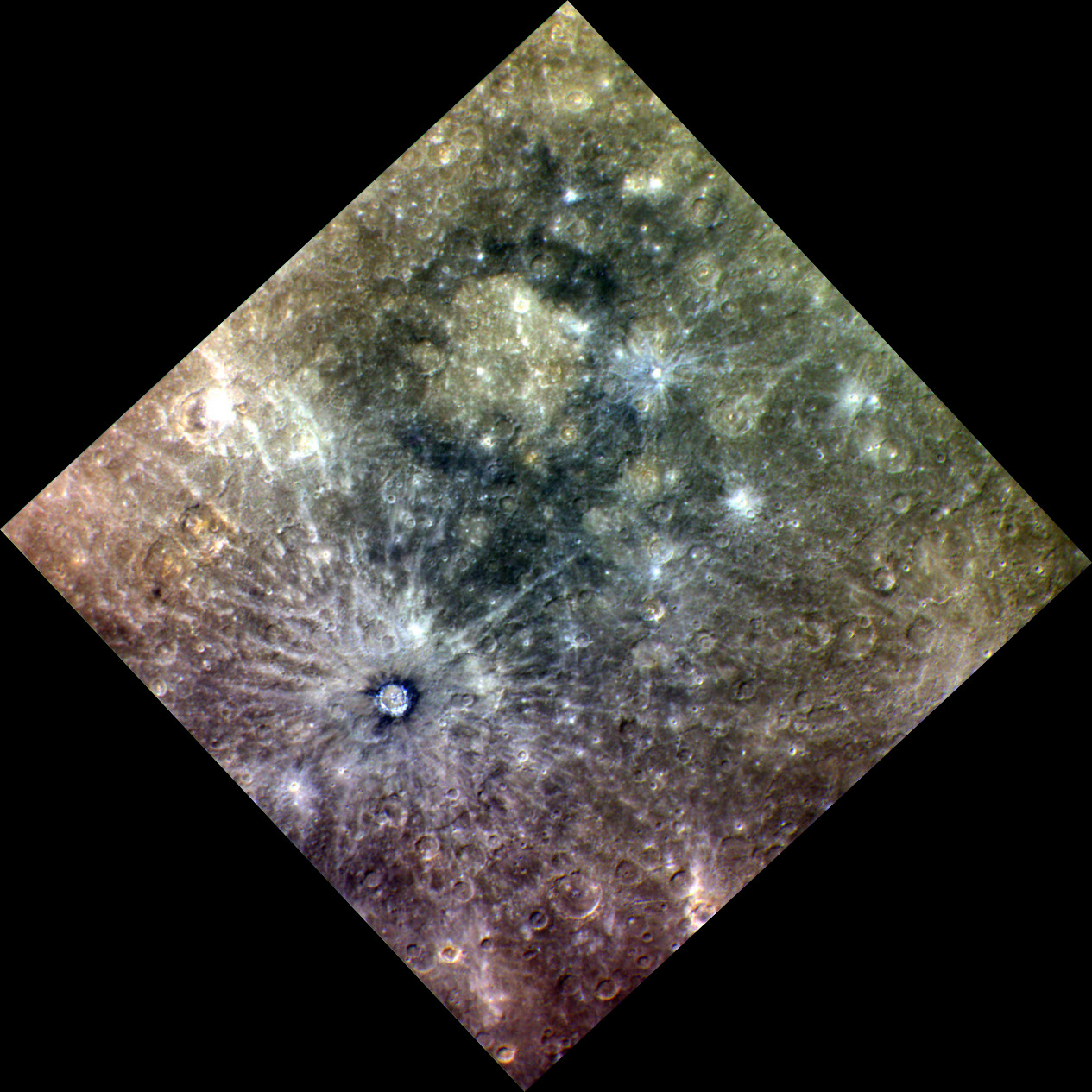
Exaggerated color image by MESSENGER, with Tolstoj at top and Bashō in lower left

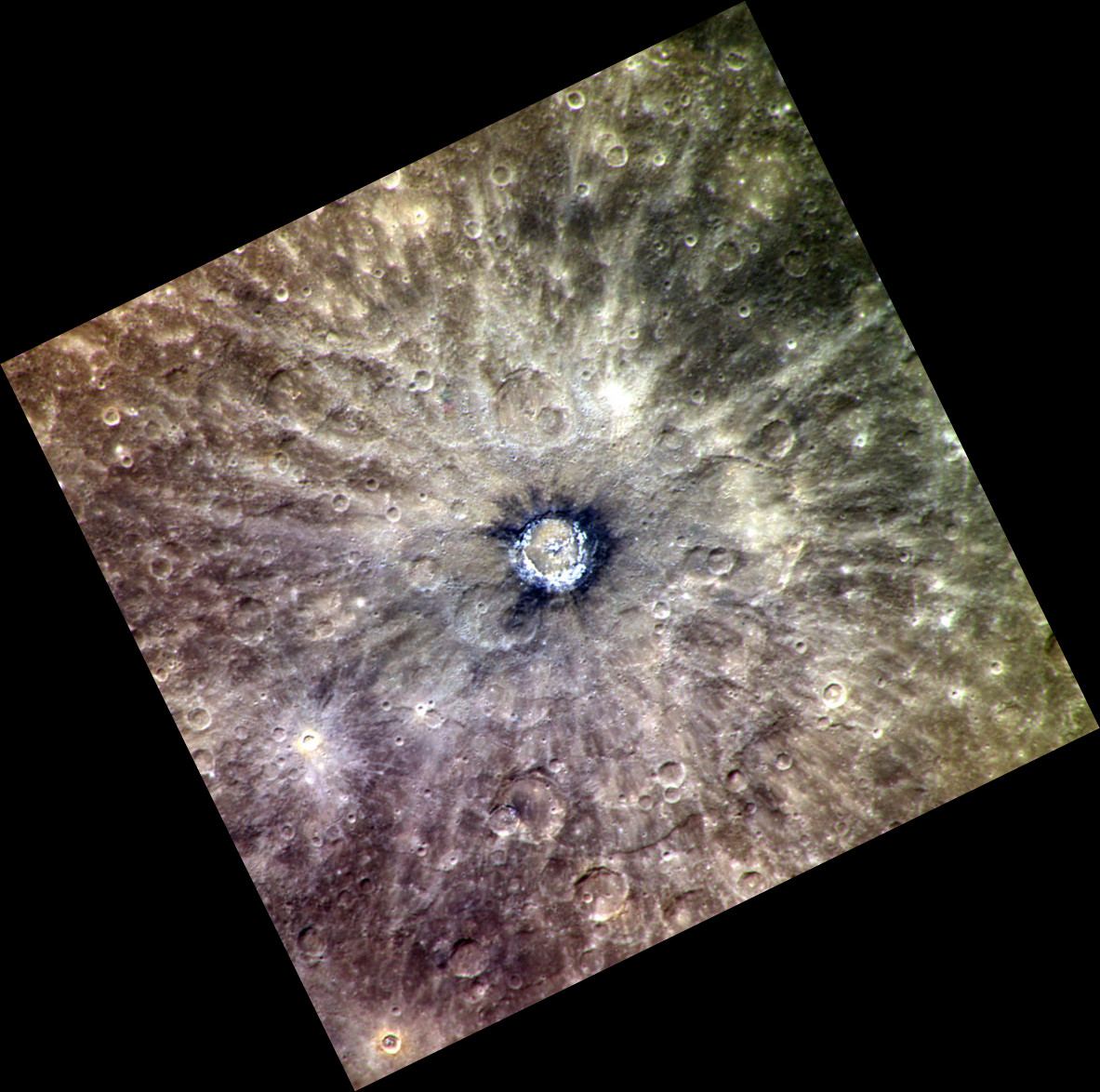
Similar image centered on Bashō

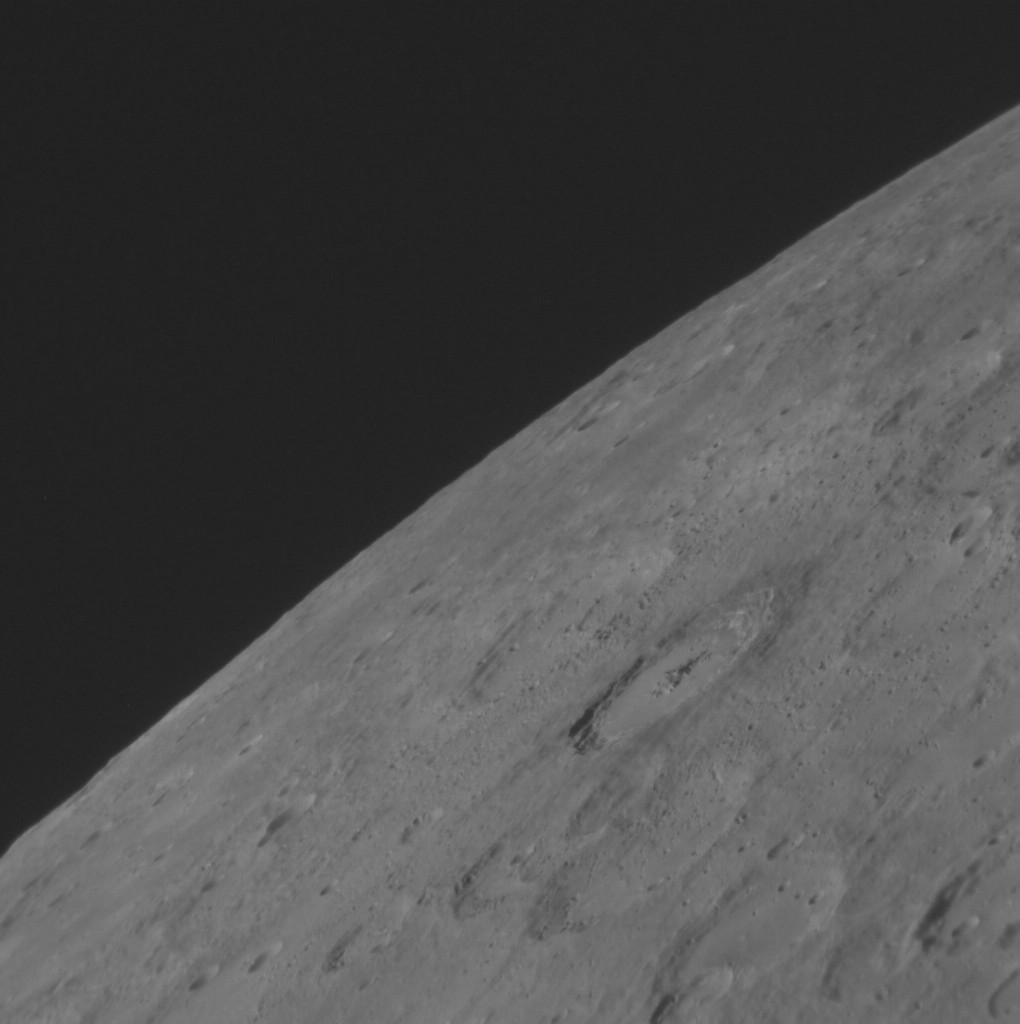
Oblique view from MESSENGER
