= Bello (crater) =

Crater on Mercury

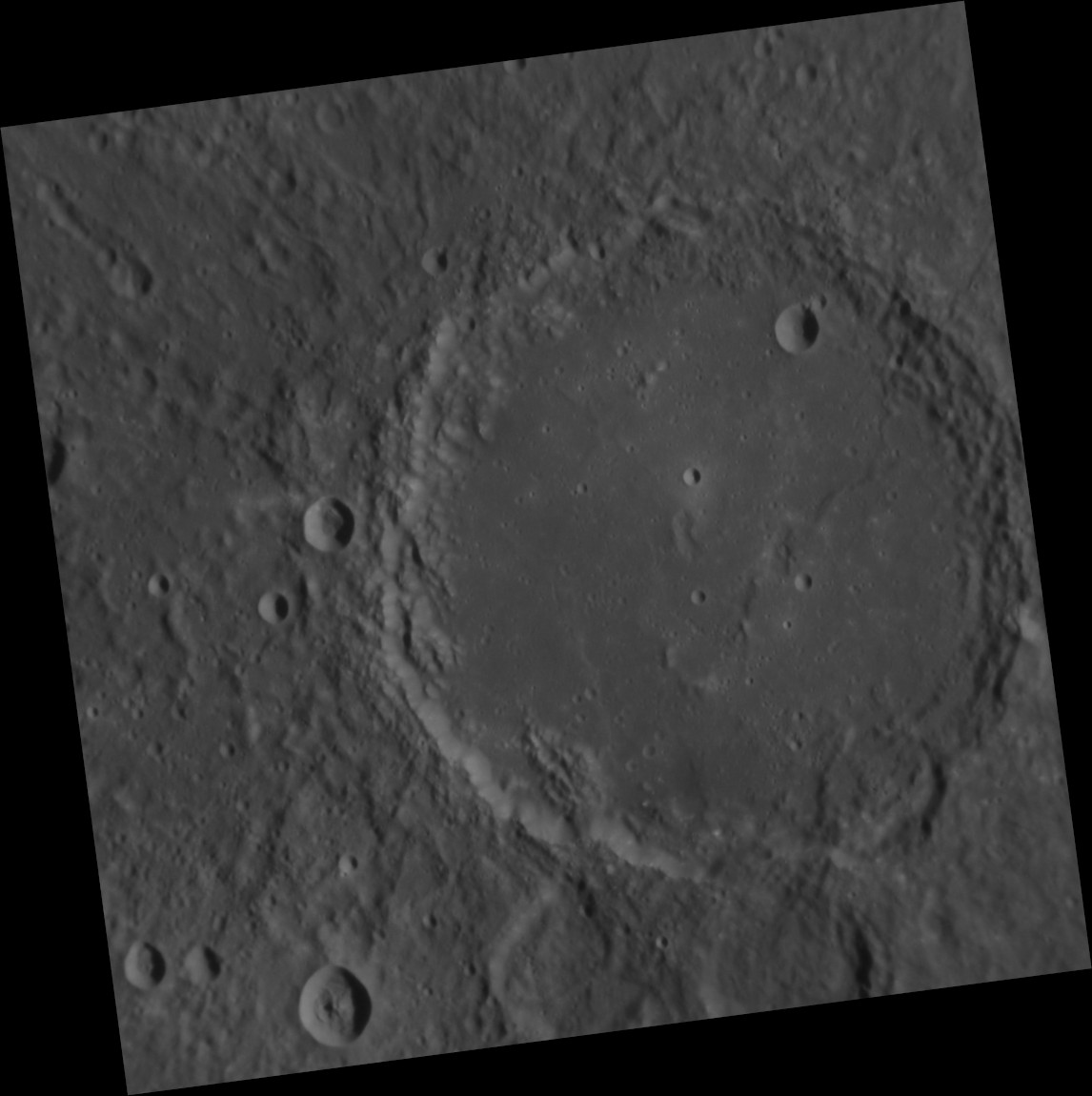
- MESSENGER NAC
- Feature type: Impact crater
- Location: Beethoven quadrangle, Mercury
- Coordinates: 18.9°S 120.0°W
- Diameter: 129 km (80 mi)
- Eponym: Andrés Bello

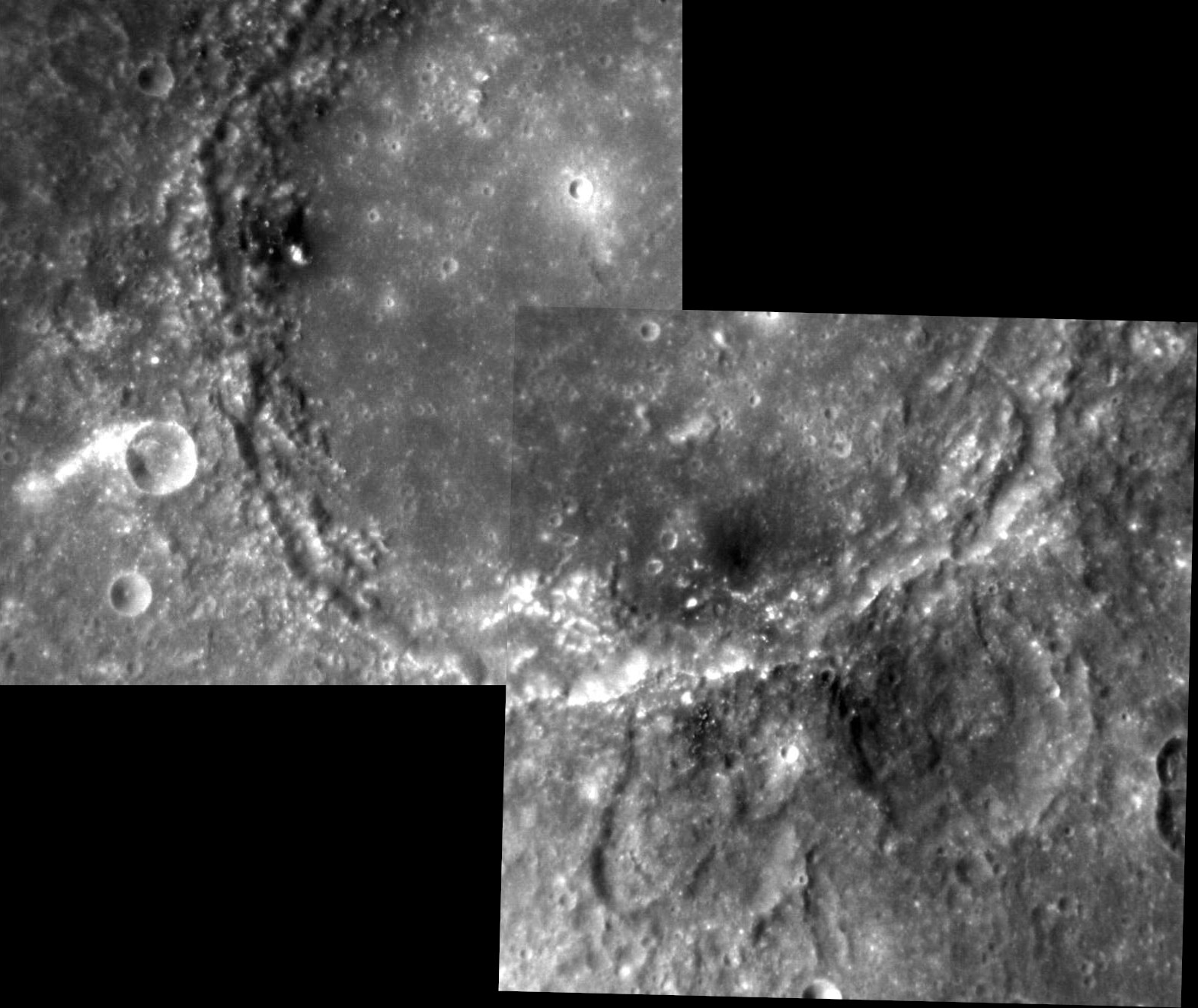
Dark areas on west and south sides of Bello crater, at a low phase angle (~28°)

Bello is a crater on Mercury. It has a diameter of 129 kilometers. Its name was adopted by the International Astronomical Union (IAU) in 1976. Bello is named for the Venezuelan poet Andrés Bello, who lived from 1781 to 1865.

At the west rim of Bello is a dark spot of low reflectance material (LRM), closely associated with hollows. Regions along the south and southeastern rims are also fairly dark.

Bello lies entirely within the Beethoven basin.
