= Liszt (crater) =

Crater on Mercury

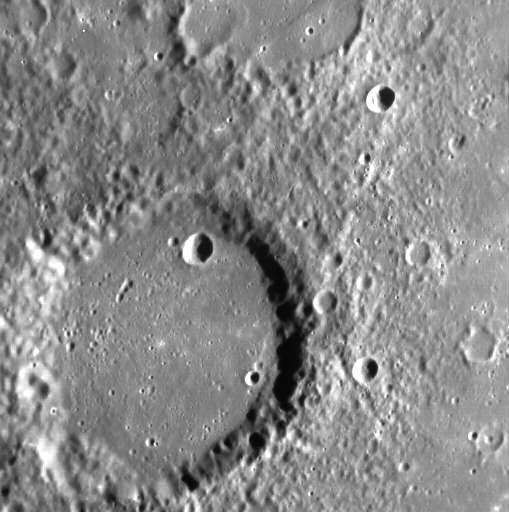
- MESSENGER NAC image of Liszt
- Feature type: Impact crater
- Location: Tolstoj quadrangle, Mercury
- Coordinates: 16.1°S 168.1°W
- Diameter: 85 km (53 mi)
- Eponym: Franz Liszt

Liszt is a crater on Mercury. It has a diameter of 85 kilometers. Its name was adopted by the International Astronomical Union (IAU) in 1985. Liszt is named for the Hungarian composer Franz Liszt, who lived from 1811 to 1886.

Liszt lies on the west side of the Tolstoj basin.

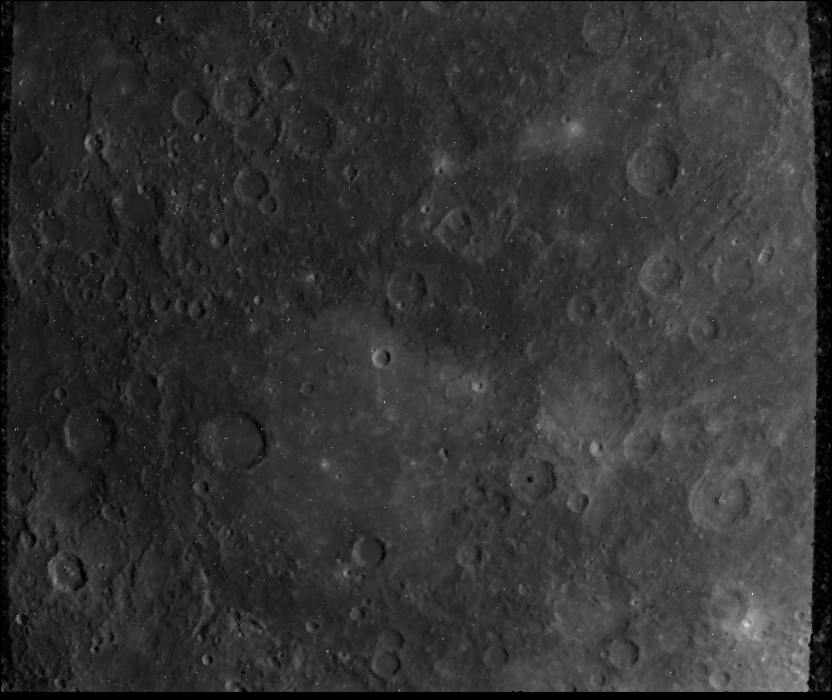
Mariner 10 image with Tolstoj and Liszt at bottom

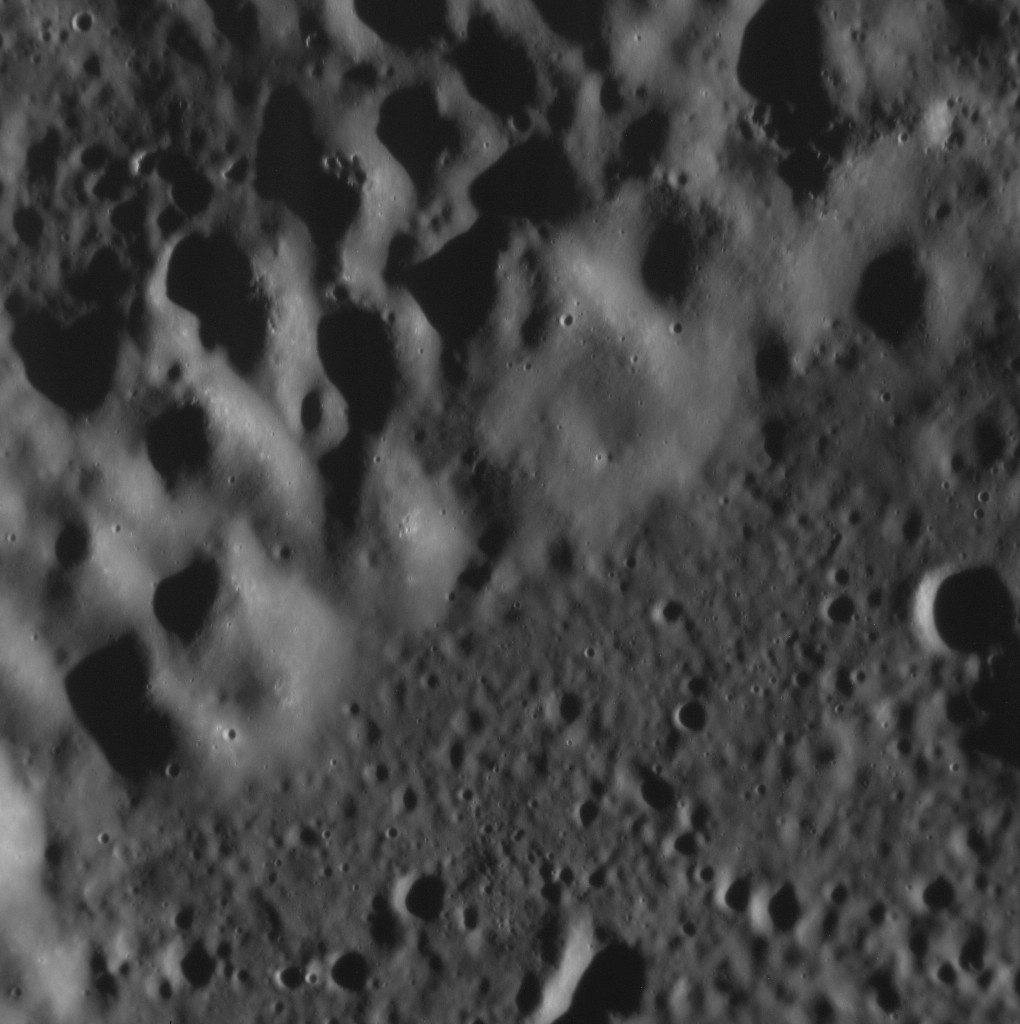
Northwest rim of Liszt crater. The image is about 14.3 km wide.
