= Gogol (crater) =

Crater on Mercury

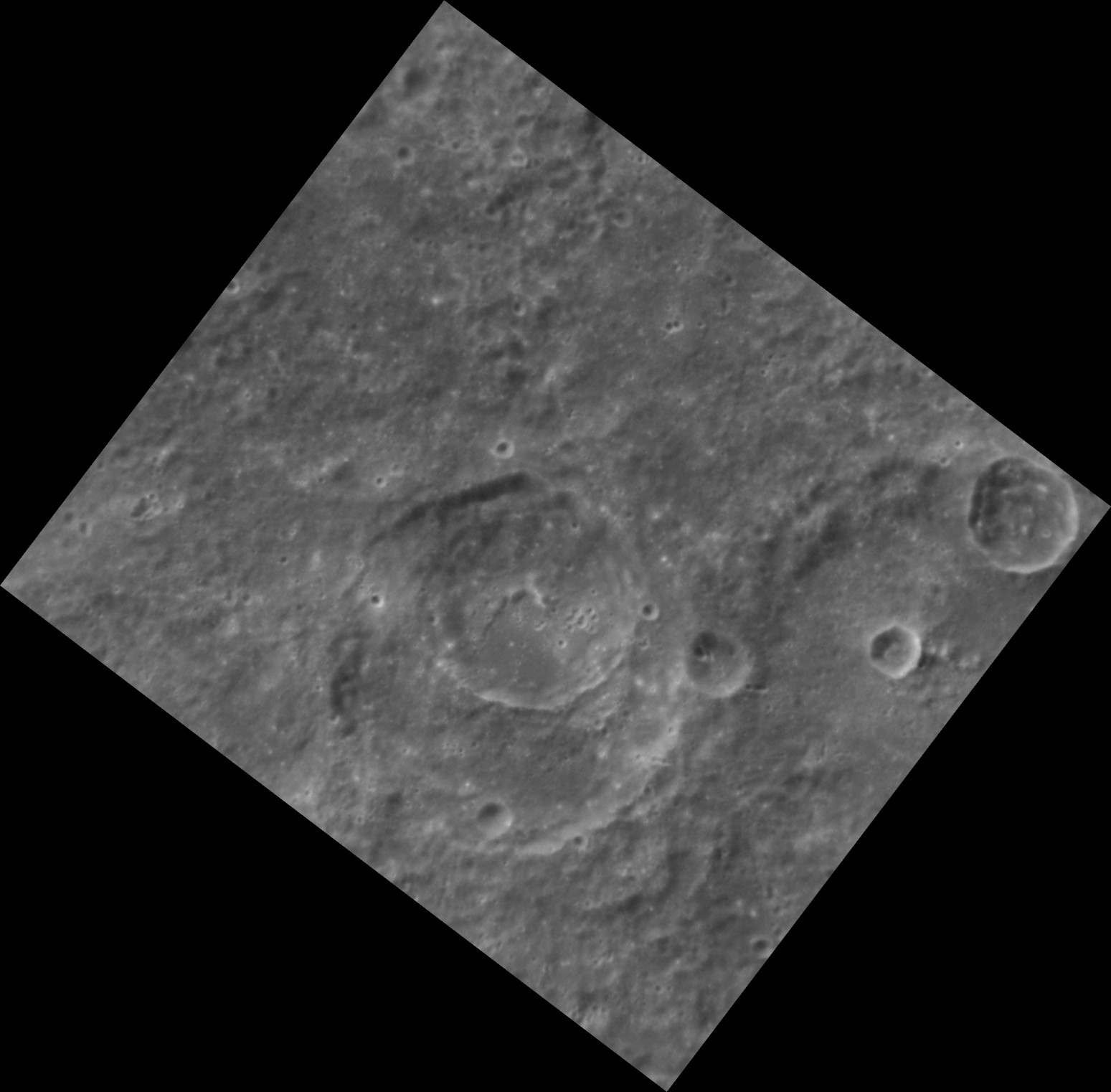
- MESSENGER NAC
- Feature type: Impact crater
- Location: Michelangelo quadrangle, Mercury
- Coordinates: 28.26°S 147.46°W
- Diameter: 79 km (49 mi)
- Eponym: Nikolai Gogol

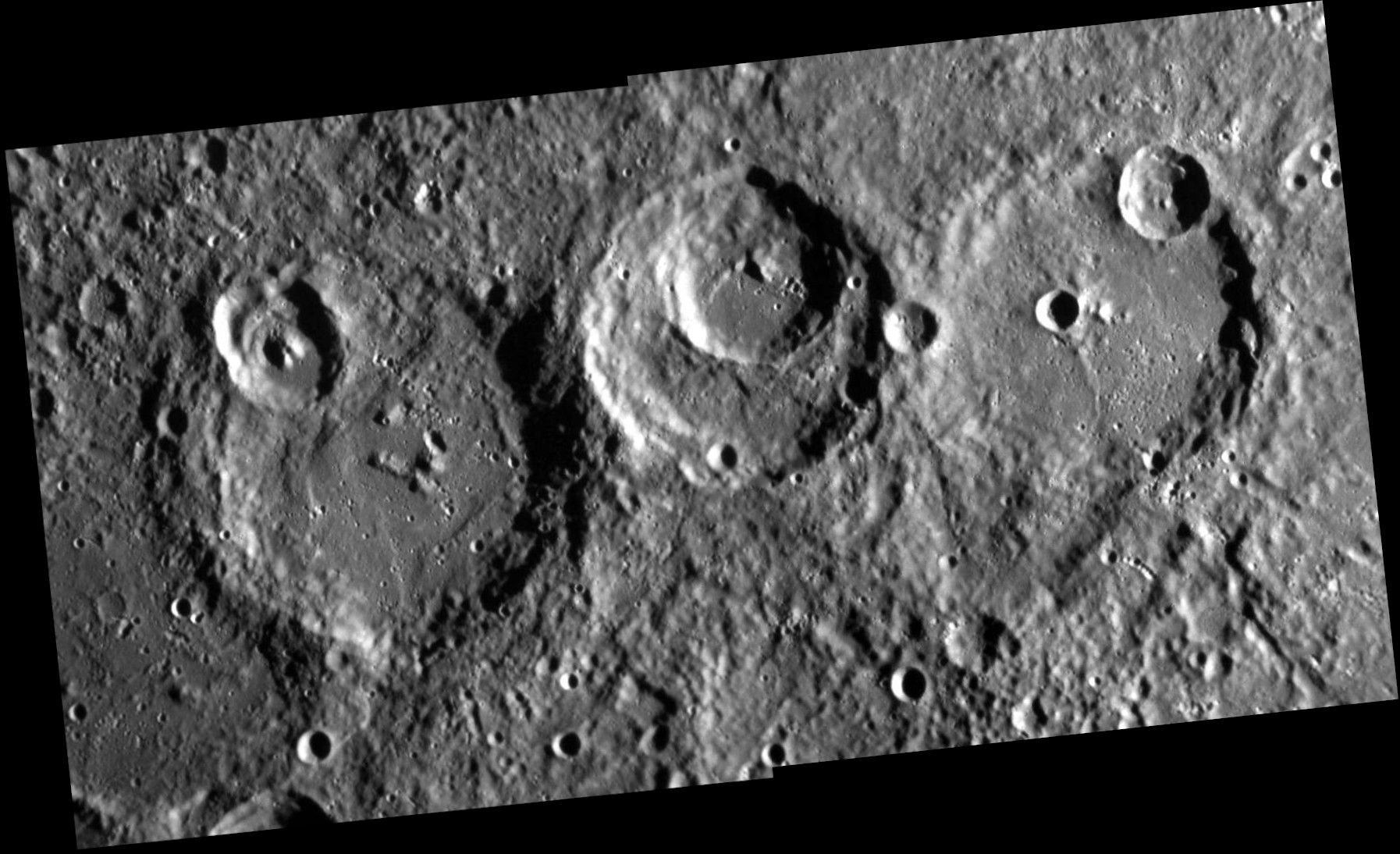
Gogol at center with unnamed craters to east and west

Gogol is a crater on Mercury. Its name was adopted by the International Astronomical Union (IAU) in 1985. Gogol is named for the Russian playwright Nikolai Gogol, who lived from 1809 to 1852. The crater was first imaged by Mariner 10 in 1974.

The large crater Vālmiki is to the northeast of Gogol. Bartók is to the east.
