= Bartók (crater) =

Crater on Mercury

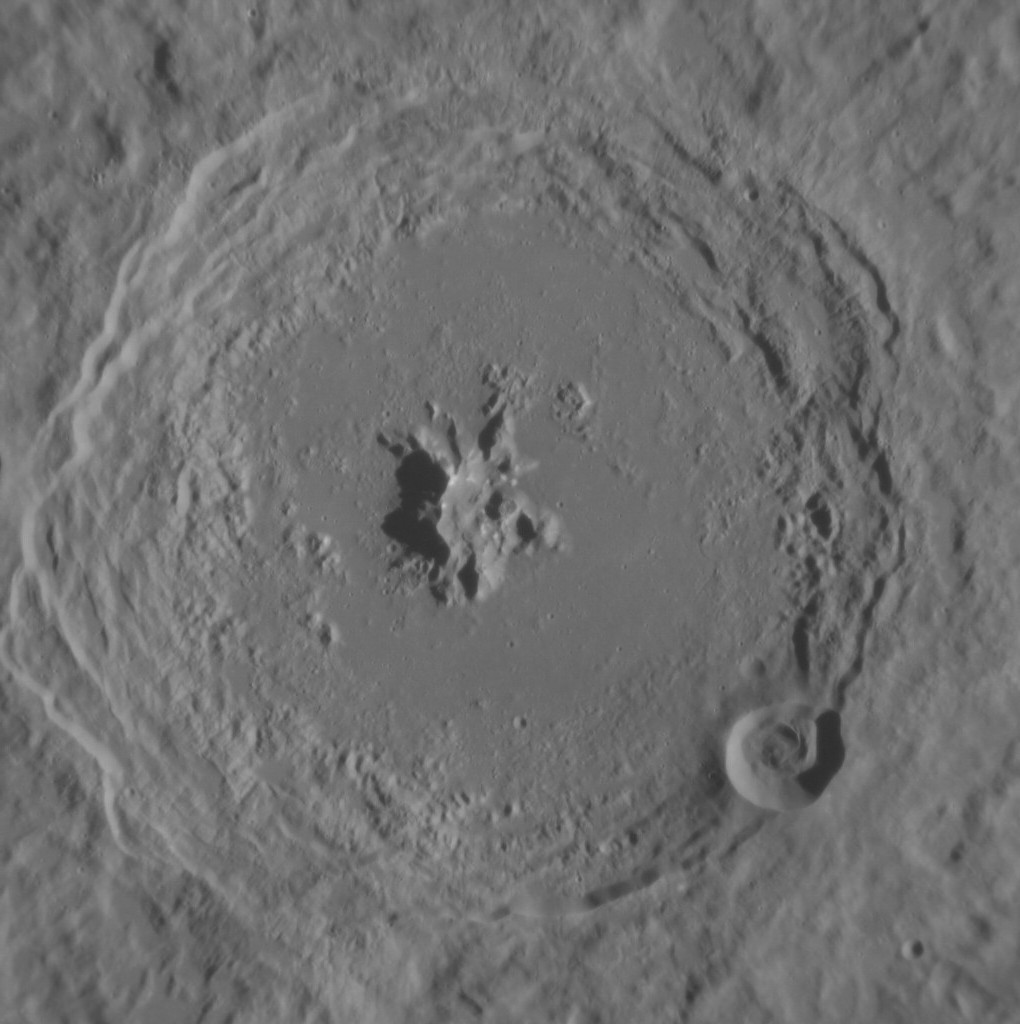
- MESSENGER NAC image
- Feature type: Central-peak impact crater
- Location: Michelangelo quadrangle, Mercury
- Coordinates: 29.22°S 135.06°W
- Diameter: 118 km (73 mi)
- Eponym: Béla Bartók

Bartók is a crater on Mercury. Its name was adopted by the International Astronomical Union (IAU) in 1979. Bartók is named for the Hungarian composer Béla Bartók, who lived from 1881 to 1945. The crater was first imaged by Mariner 10 in 1974.

Bartók is the largest crater of the Kuiperian system on Mercury, at 118 km diameter. It is followed by Amaral crater.

Within the central peak complex of Bartók is a dark spot of low reflectance material (LRM). Dark spots are associated with hollows.

To the northeast of Bartók is the large basin Beethoven. The crater Vālmiki is to the northwest of Bartók, and Gogol is to the west.

== Views ==
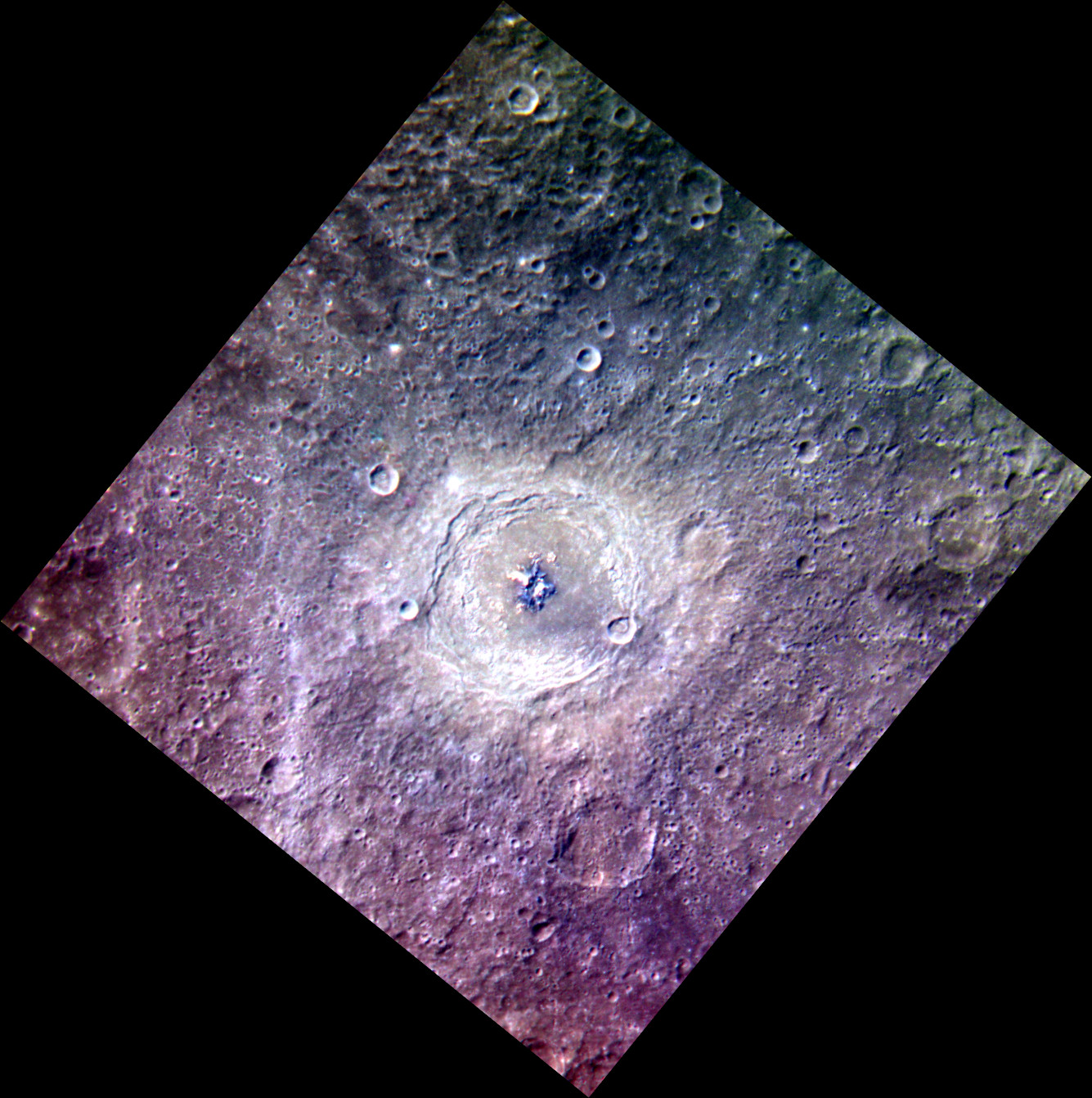
Approximate color image of Bartók at a high sun angle showing that the central peak is much darker than the floor and ejecta of the crater, with some areas that are much brighter

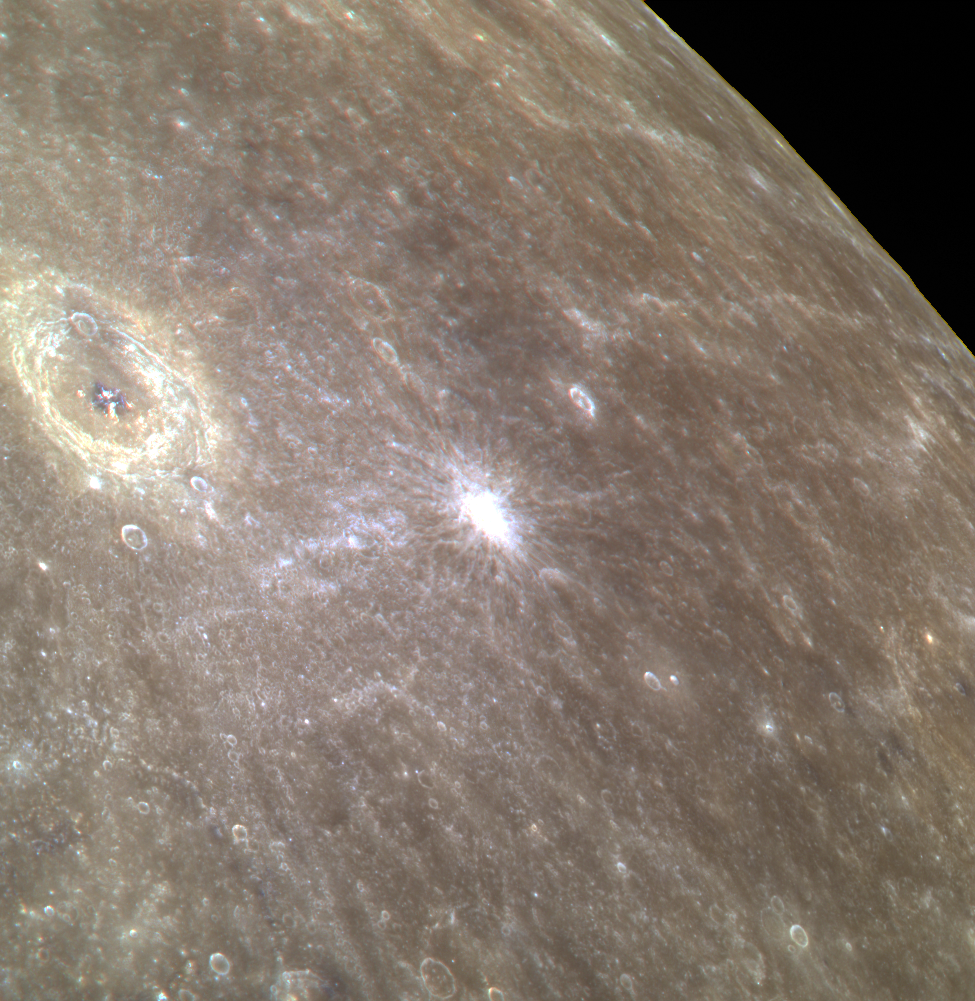
Another color image

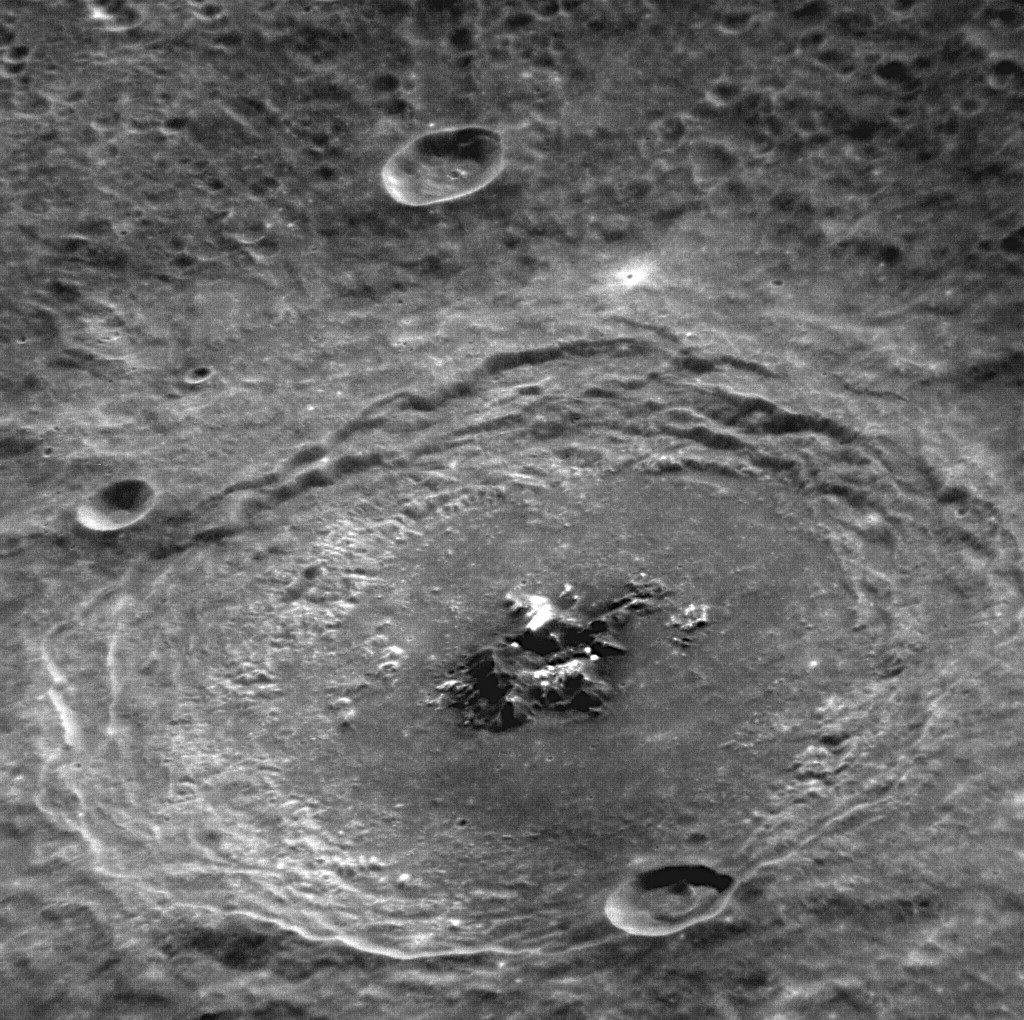
Closer oblique view also at a high sun angle
