= Beethoven (crater) =

Crater on Mercury

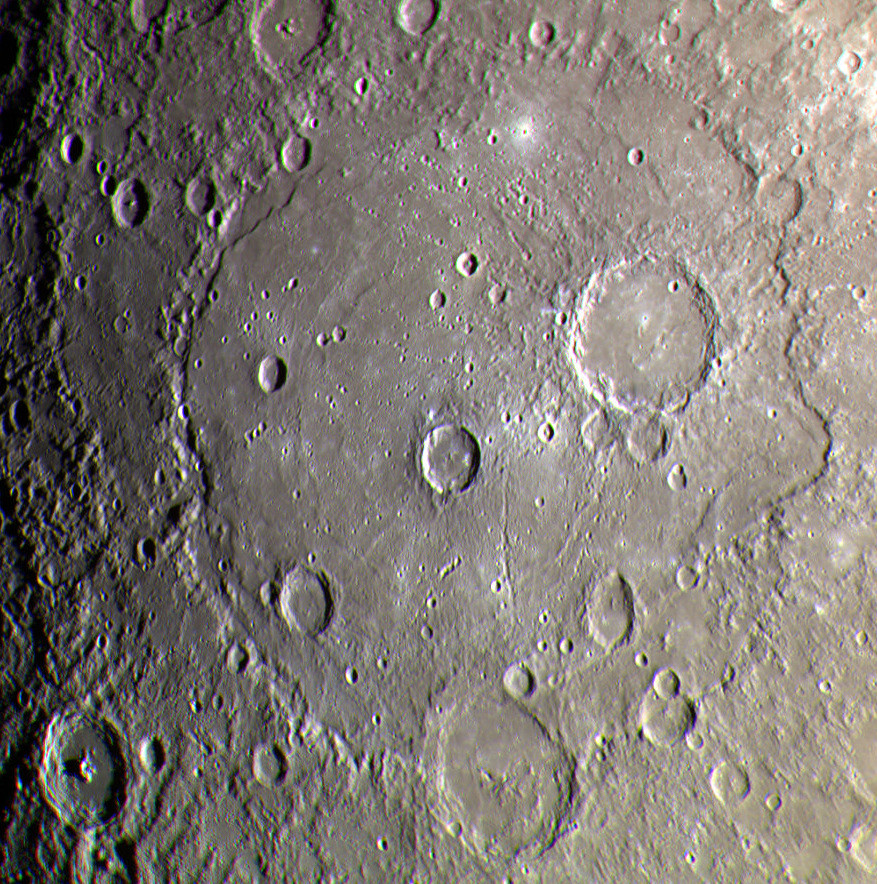
- MESSENGER image of Beethoven
- Feature type: Impact crater
- Location: Beethoven quadrangle, Mercury
- Coordinates: 20°S 124°W
- Diameter: 630 km (390 mi)
- Eponym: Ludwig van Beethoven

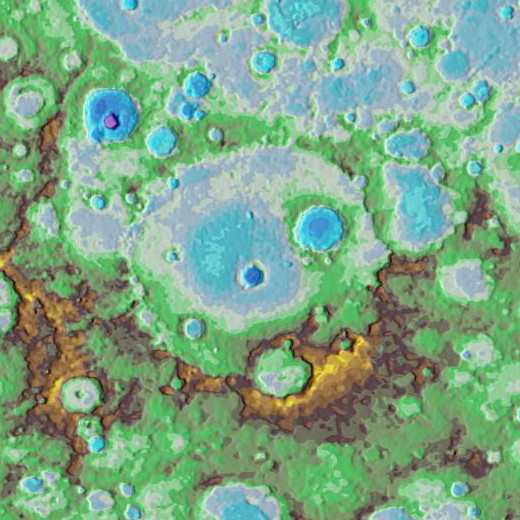
Topographic map of Beethoven

Beethoven is a crater at latitude 20°S, longitude 124°W on Mercury. It is 630 km in diameter (Note: Other sources give slightly smaller diameter—625 km.) and was named after Ludwig van Beethoven. It is the eleventh largest named impact crater in the Solar System and the third largest on Mercury (after Caloris and Rembrandt).

Unlike many basins of similar size on the Moon, such as the Orientale Basin, Beethoven is not multi-ringed. Remnant ejecta blankets around parts of the Beethoven are subdued in appearance and their margins poorly defined in places. The crater wall (rim) of Beethoven is buried by its ejecta blanket and by plains materials and is barely visible. The floor of the basin is covered with intermediate smooth plains material, which has the same reflectance as the exterior intermediate terrain. However, there are no wrinkle ridges or graben inside the basin like those in Caloris.

Spudis and Prosser have suggested that Beethoven may possibly be late c3 in age or as old as early c2, which means that it is older than the Caloris Basin. It is currently considered to be Tolstojan in age.

The depth of Beethoven is estimated to be 2.5 ± 0.7 km from the stereo derived digital elevation models based on Mariner 10 images of the planet. This is significantly less than the depth of lunar basins of the similar size indicating that Beethoven probably has relaxed from its post impact shape. There is also a broad topographic rise in the north–west margin of Beethoven.

A scarp that is roughly parallel with the west rim of Beethoven is known as Duyfken Rupes. The crater Bello lies within the east half of Beethoven, and the crater Sayat-Nova lies across the southern rim. The large, fresh crater Bartók is to the southwest of Beethoven.
