= Tolstoj (crater) =

Crater on Mercury

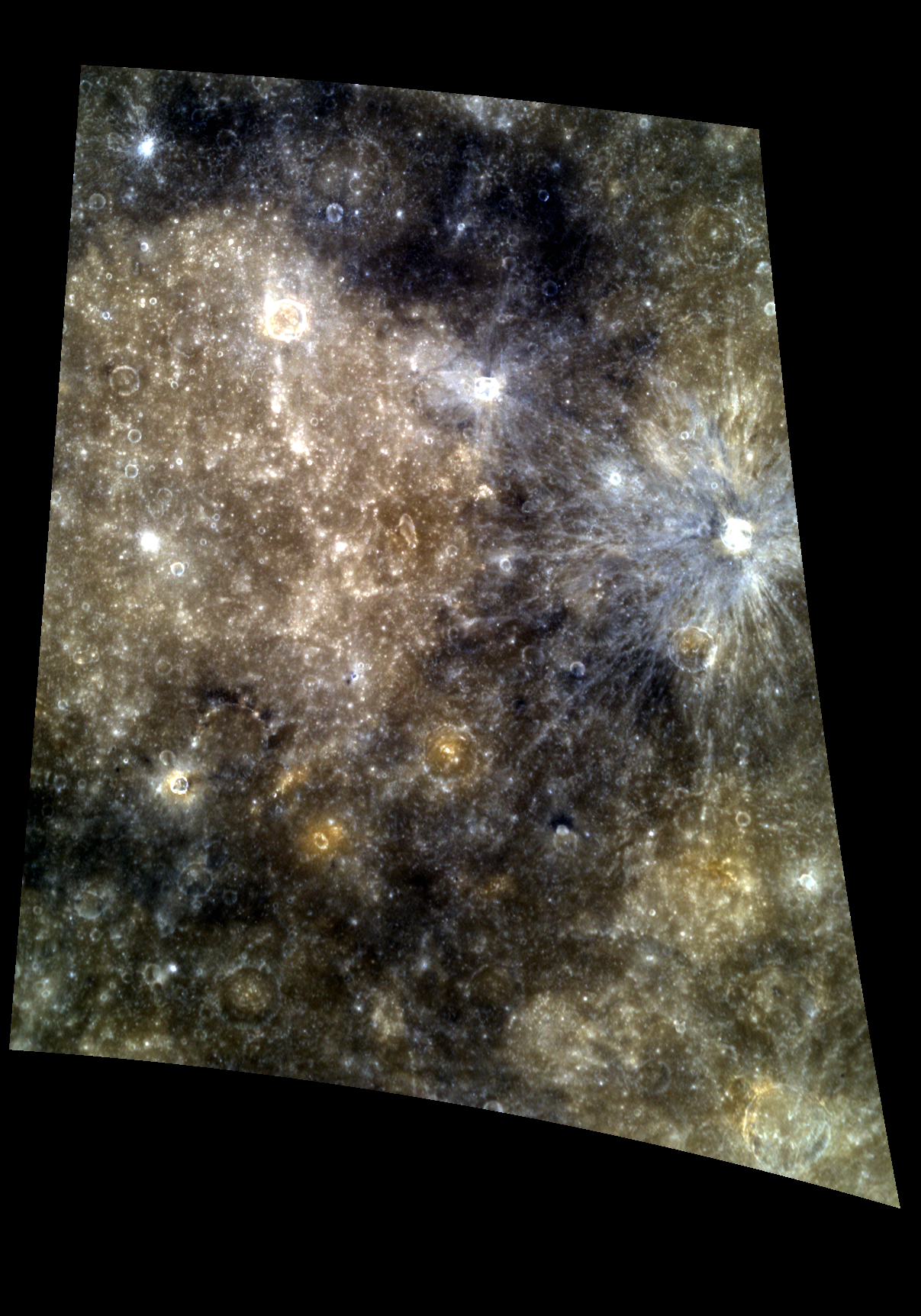
- Enhanced color mosaic by MESSENGER
- Feature type: Impact crater
- Location: Tolstoj quadrangle, Mercury
- Coordinates: 16.3°S 163.5°W
- Diameter: 390 km (240 mi)
- Eponym: Leo Tolstoy

Tolstoj is a large, ancient impact crater on Mercury. It was named after Leo Tolstoy by the IAU in 1976. The albedo feature Solitudo Maiae appears to be associated with this crater.

The impact that produced the Tolstoj Basin occurred very early in the history of Mercury. Two ragged, discontinuous rings approximately 356 km and 510 km in diameter encompass the structure but are poorly developed on its north and northeast sides; a third partial ring with a diameter of 466 km occurs on its southeast side. Diffuse patches of material of dark albedo lie outside the innermost ring. The central part of the basin is covered by a high reflectance smooth plains (HRP) material. The bright interior of the basin is noticeably redder than the surrounding plains, which are made of a bluer low reflectance material (LRM). The dark annulus of ejecta around Tolstoj is called the Goya Formation, defined by lineated and hummocky topography. The ejecta has one of darkest surfaces on Mercury.

The depth of Tolstoj is estimated to be 2.0 ± 0.7 km from the stereo derived digital elevation models based on Mariner 10 images of the planet. This is significantly less than the depth of lunar basins of the similar size indicating that Tolstoj probably has relaxed from its post impact shape.

The Tolstoj basin is used to define a time-stratigraphic system, the Tosltojan system, with the age of around 4.0–3.9 billion years. The older system (< 4.0 billion years) is called pre-Tosltojan, while the younger is called Calorian (3.9–3.5 billion years).

Despite Tolstoj's great age and its embayment by the ancient inter-crater plains, it retains an extensive and remarkably well preserved, radially lineated ejecta blanket around two-thirds of its circumference. Part of the ejecta was disrupted by the impact of the crater Liszt. The ejecta tends to be blocky and only weakly lineated between the inner and outer rings. Radial lineations with a slight swirly pattern are best seen on the southwest side of Tolstoj. The unusual rectilinear map pattern of the ejecta suggests: (1) control of the ejecta pattern by prebasin structures, (2) preferential burial along structural trends of an originally symmetrical ejecta blanket by the intercrater plains material, or (3) formation of Tolstoj by an oblique impact from the northwest that produced an ejecta blanket with bilateral symmetry and little or no deposition uprange. Analysis of stereophotography of Tolstoj ejecta northeast of the crater suggests that this deposit has been upwarped to a higher elevation relative to the surrounding plains.

Irregular depressions, on the eastern floor and within the southern ejecta blanket, may be evidence of explosive volcanism.

== Views ==
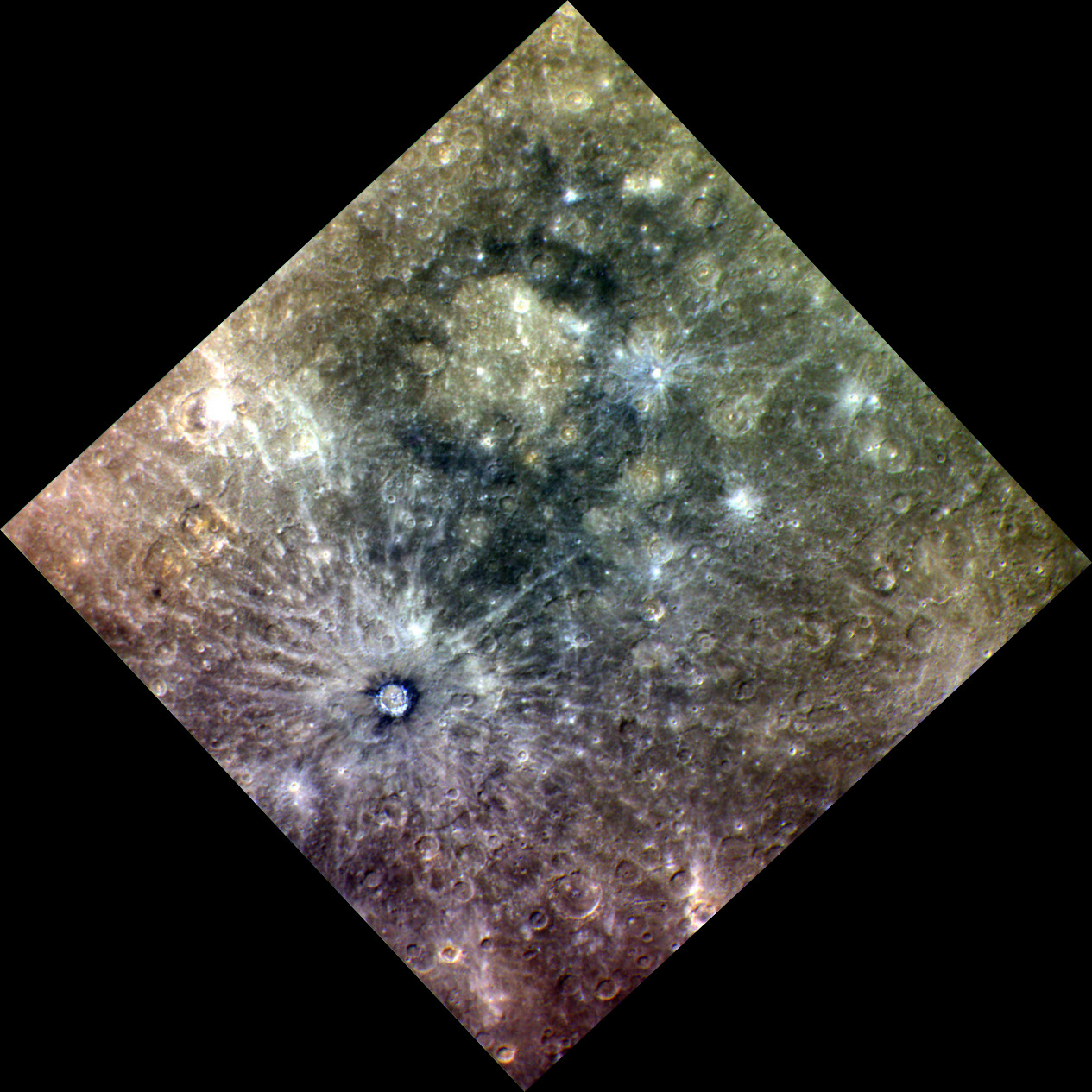
Enhanced color image of Tolstoj crater (top center) and Bashō crater (lower left)

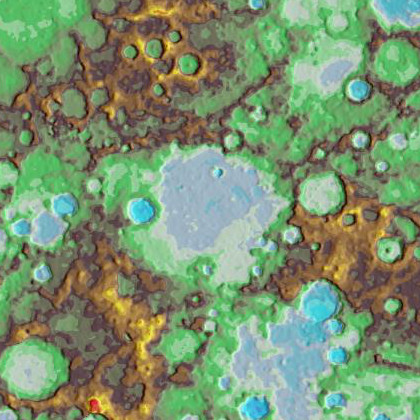
Topographic map centered on Tolstoj

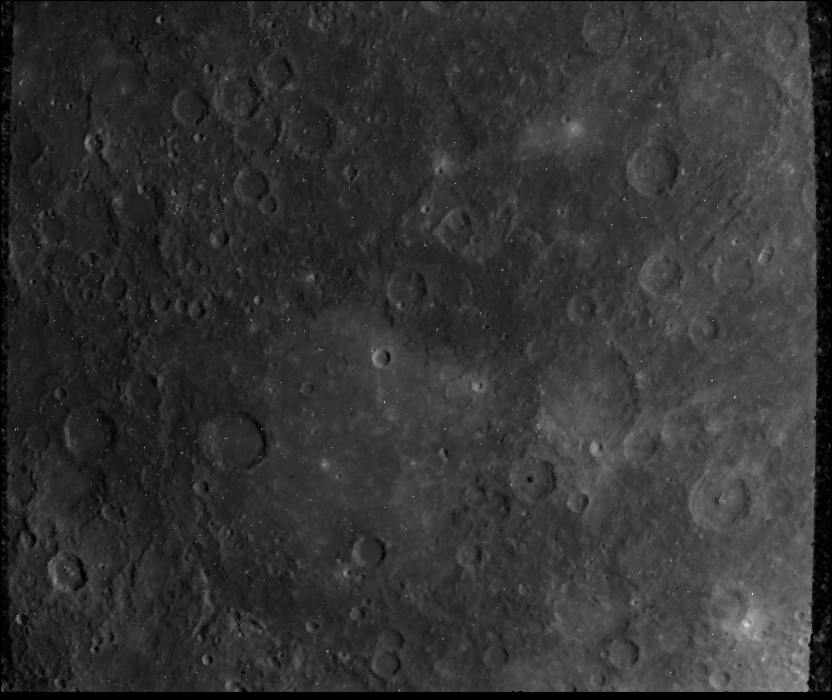
Mariner 10 image with Tolstoj at bottom

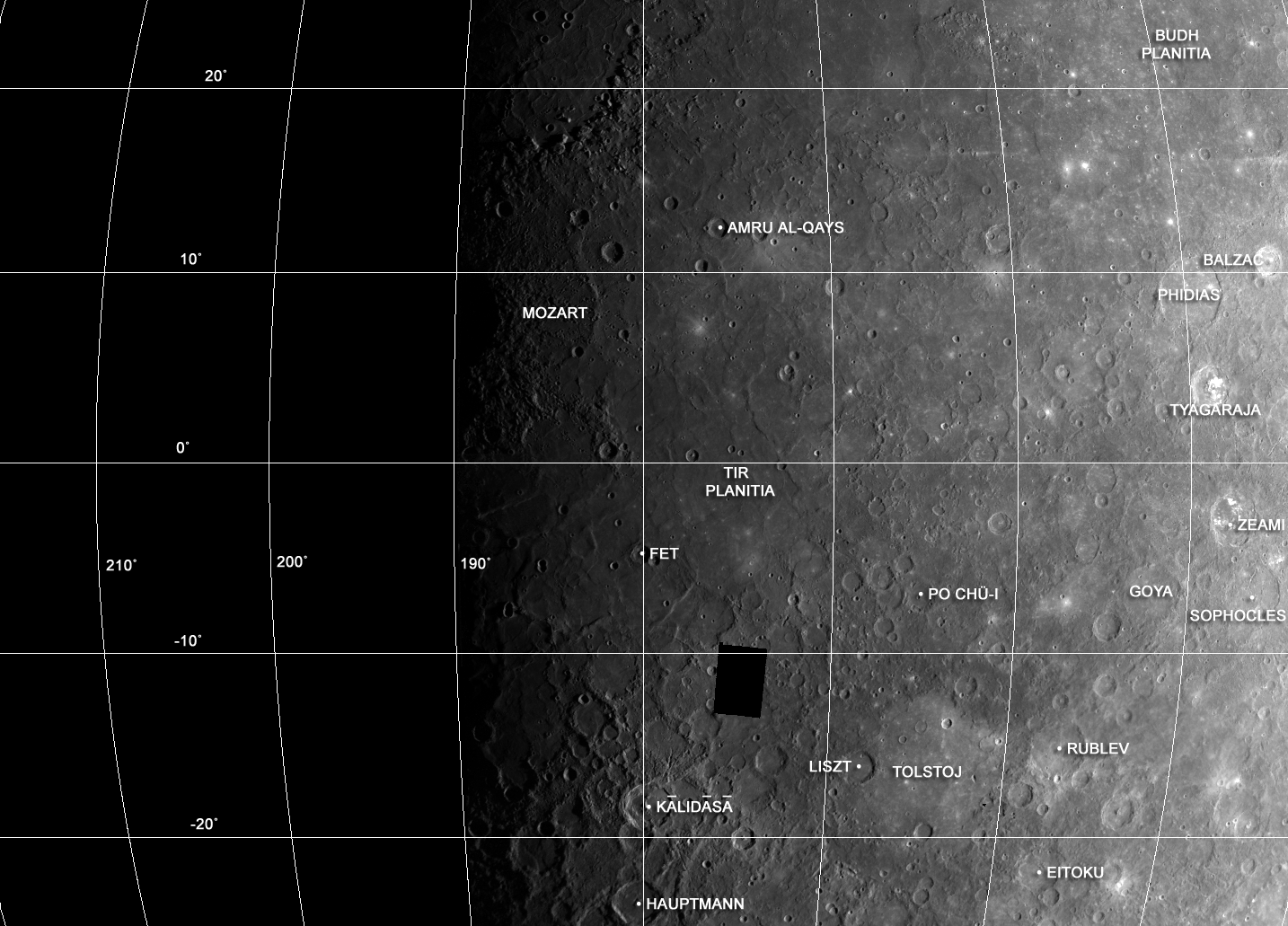
Tolstoj is at lower right on this map

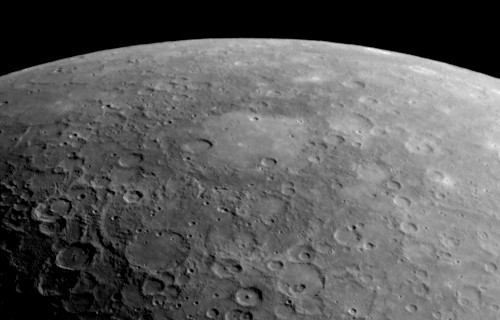
Distant oblique view

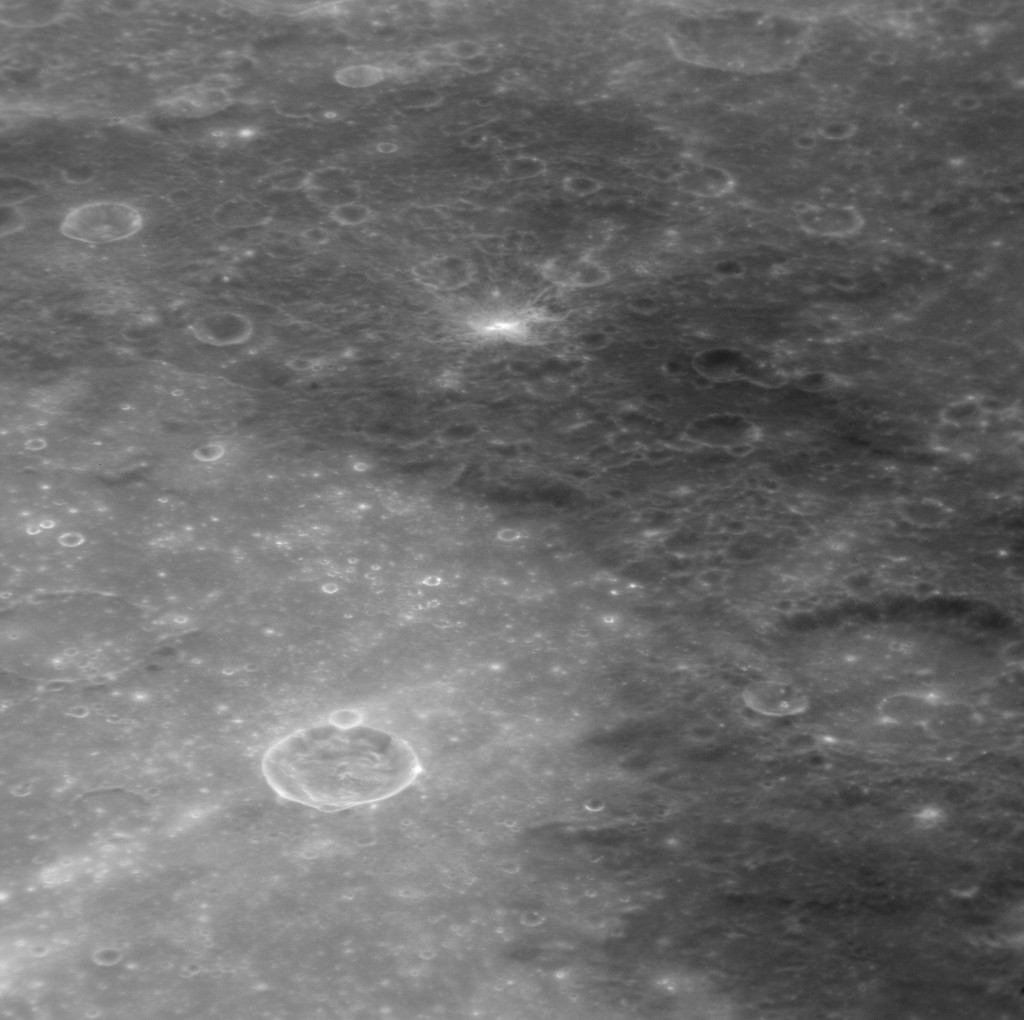
Northern Tolstoj crater
