= Olcott =

Olcott may refer to:

== Places ==
- Olcott, Bell County, Kentucky
- Olcott, New York
- Olcott, West Virginia
- Olcott (crater), a relatively fresh crater on the far side of the Moon

== Other uses ==
- Olcott (surname)
- Henry Steel Olcott
- Justice Olcott (disambiguation)
