= Ismenia Patera =

Martian feature

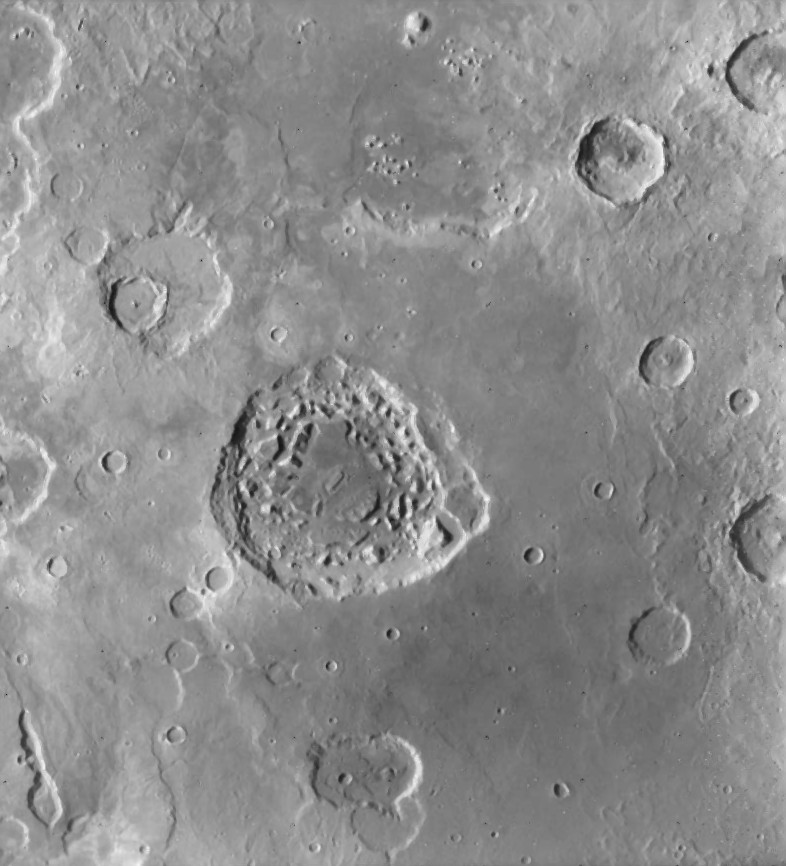
- Viking Orbiter 2 image
- Feature type: Patera
- Coordinates: 38.55°N 1.8°E
- Naming: Classical albedo feature name

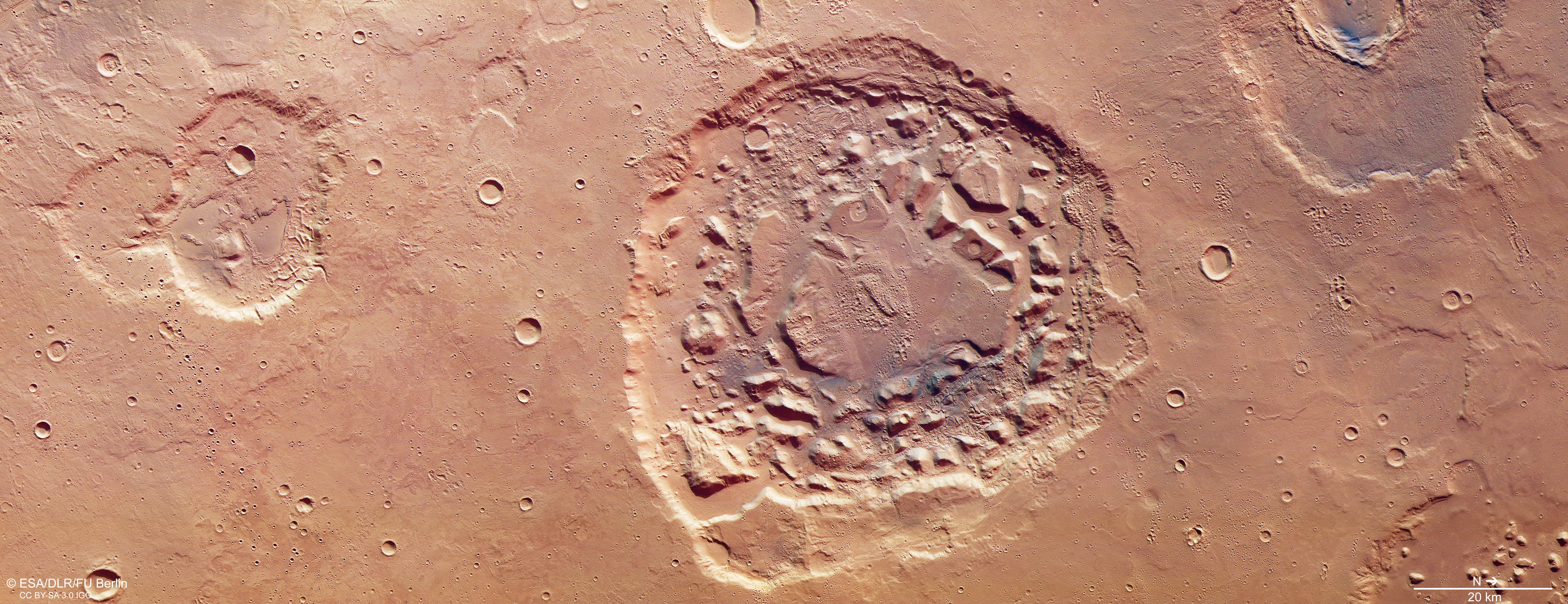
Mars Express view of Ismenia Patera

Eden Patera is a feature located in the Ismenius Lacus quadrangle on the planet Mars, in the highland region Arabia Terra. It is approximately circular and 82 km in diameter. It was named in 2012 by the IAU.

== See also ==
- Orcus Patera
- Eden Patera
