= Alcott (disambiguation) =

Alcott is a surname. It may also refer to:

- Alcott Skei Gwentshe (1914–1966), South African political activist
- Alcott Neary (1892–1941), American football and basketball player and college football and basketball head coach
- Alcott (crater), an impact crater on Venus
- "The Alcott", a 2023 single by The National featuring Taylor Swift
- Movement III, "The Alcotts", in Piano Sonata No. 2, the Concord Sonata, by Charles Ives
- Alcott Middle School, part of Norman Public Schools, a public school district serving parts of Norman, Oklahoma, United States

== See also ==
- Alcott House, Ham, Surrey, England, home of a utopian spiritual community and progressive school from 1838 to 1848
- Thoreau–Alcott House, Concord, Massachusetts, United States, on the National Register of Historic Places, residence of Henry David Thoreau and Louisa May Alcott at different times
- ALcot, a Japanese company that specializes in adult visual novels
- Alcot, South Carolina, United States, an unincorporated community named after Louisa May Alcott
