= Xiao Zhao =

Xiao Zhao or Xiaozhao may refer to:

- Xiaozhao (小昭), a fictional character in the novel The Heaven Sword and Dragon Saber
- Xiao Zhao (painter), 12th-century Chinese painter
- Xiao Zhao (crater), a crater on the planet Mercury
