= Arabia Terra =

Martian upland region

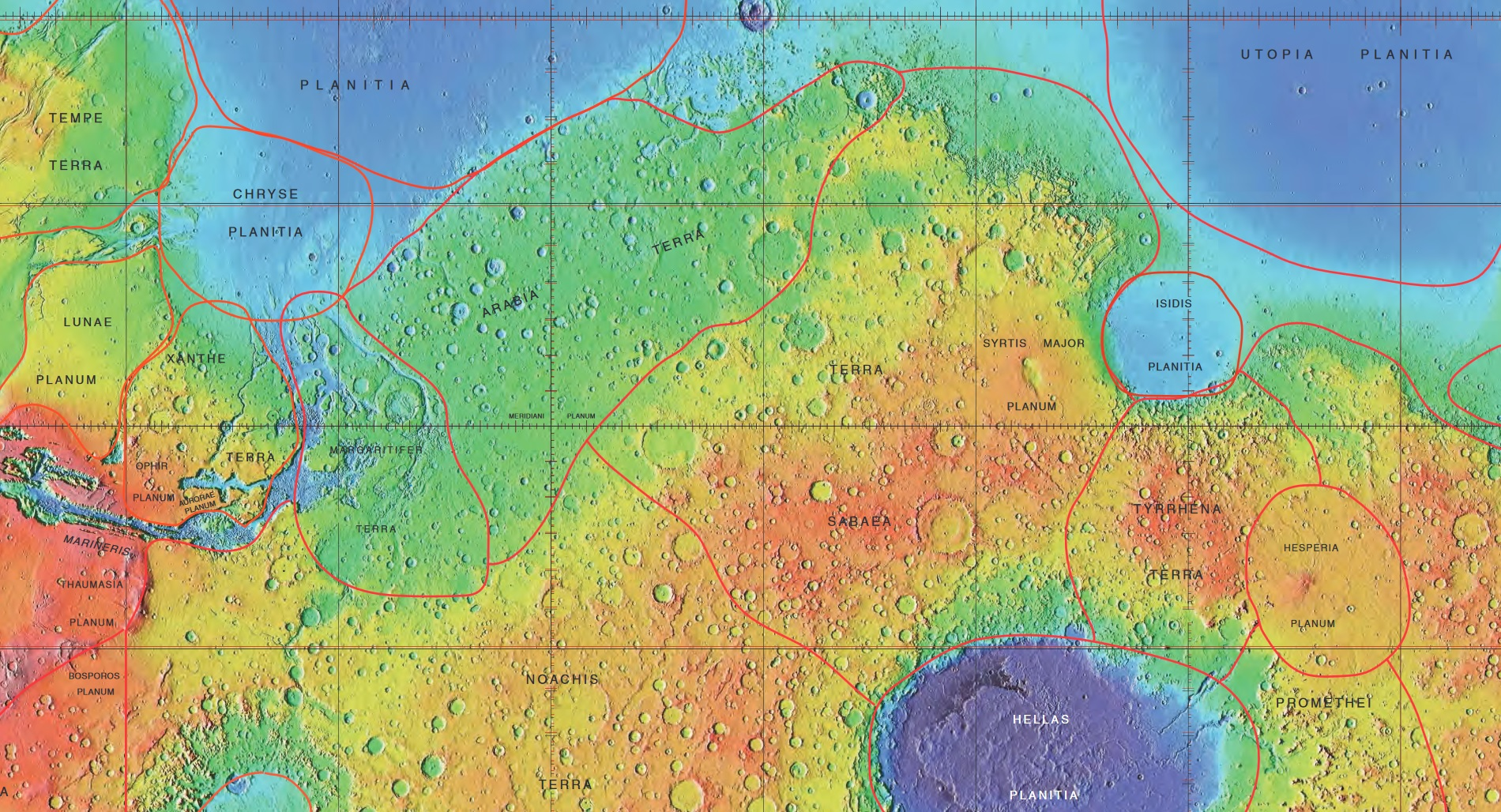
MOLA map showing boundaries for Arabia Terra and other nearby regions.

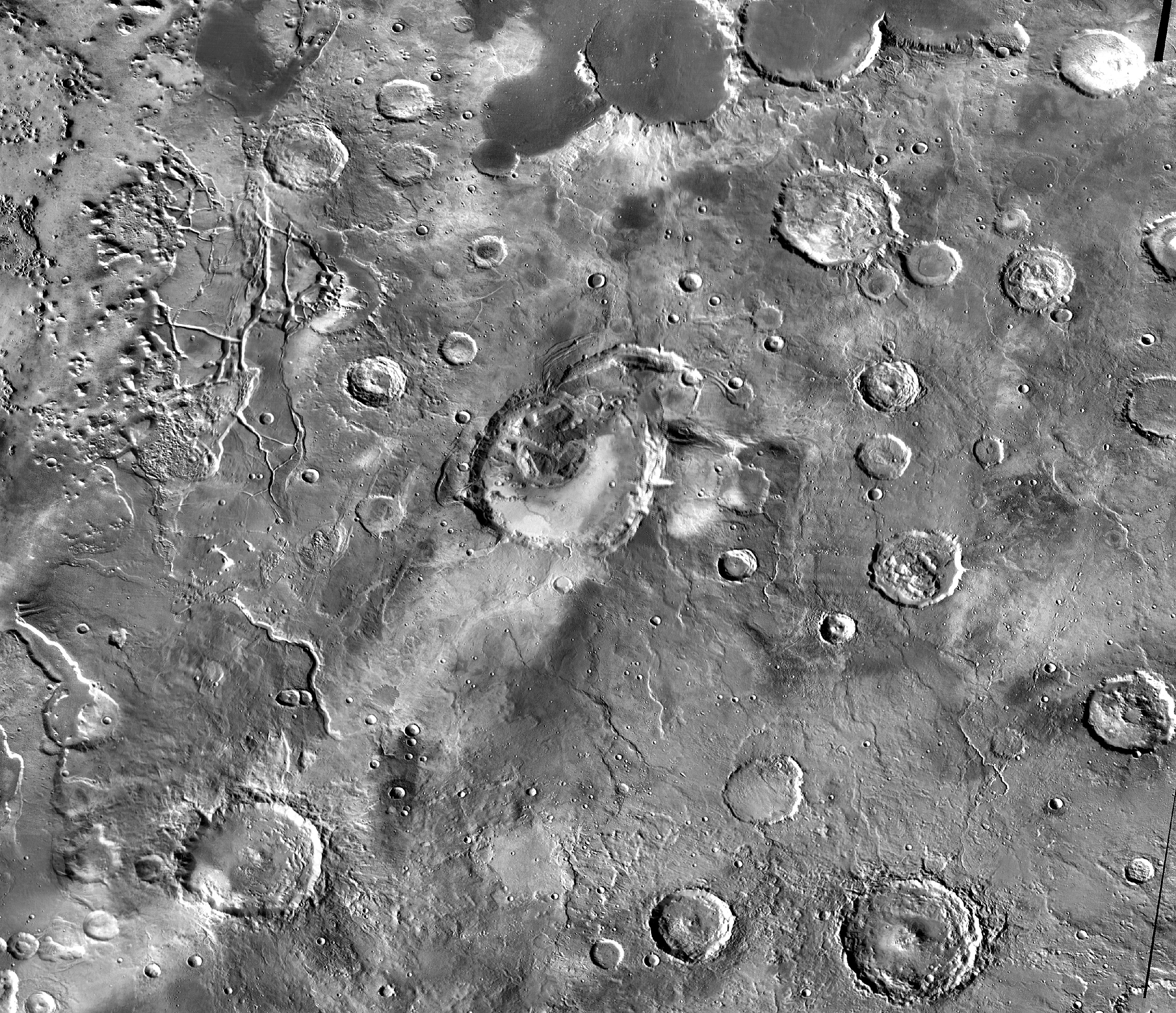
THEMIS daytime infrared image mosaic showing Eden Patera (at center), one of the proposed volcanic caldera complexes in Arabia Terra, and its surroundings

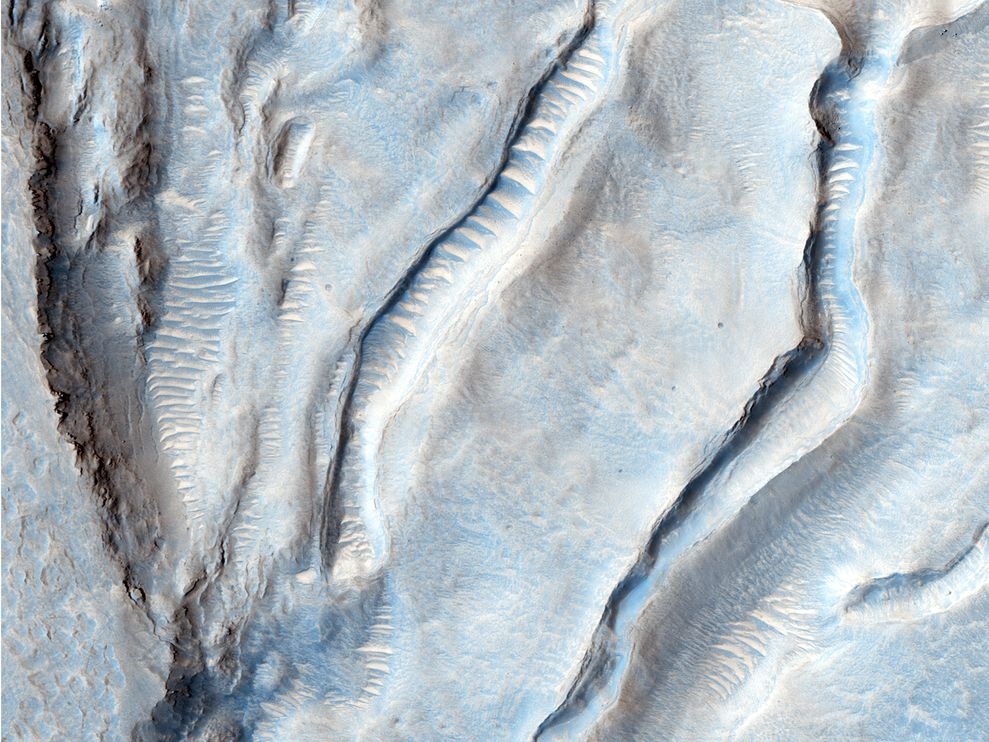
Ice sheet in Oxus Patera, a caldera in Arabia Terra. The scalloped nicks along the spines of the caldera's ridges are likely cracks caused by the expansion and contraction of ice.

Arabia Terra is a large upland region in the north of Mars that lies mostly in the Arabia quadrangle, but a small part is in the Mare Acidalium quadrangle. It is densely cratered and heavily eroded. This battered topography indicates great age, and Arabia Terra is presumed to be one of the oldest terrains on the planet. It covers as much as 4,500 km (2,800 mi) at its longest extent, centered roughly at 21°N 6°E with its eastern and southern regions rising 4 km (13,000 ft) above the north-west. Alongside its many craters, canyons wind through the Arabia Terra, many emptying into the large northern lowlands of the planet, which borders Arabia Terra to the north.

== Features ==
Arabia contains many interesting features. There are some good examples of pedestal craters in the area. A pedestal crater has its ejecta above the surrounding terrain, often forming a steep cliff. The ejecta forms a resistant layer that protects the underlying material from erosion. Mounds and buttes on the floor of some craters display many layers. The layers may have formed by volcanic processes, by wind, or by underwater deposition. Dark slope streaks have been observed in Tikhonravov Basin, a large eroded crater. The streaks appear on steep slopes and change over time. At first they are dark, then turn a lighter color, probably by the deposition of fine, light colored dust from the atmosphere. These streaks are thought by some to form by dust moving downslope in a way similar to snow avalanches on Earth.

Arabia Terra was named in 1879 after a corresponding albedo feature on a map by Giovanni Schiaparelli, who named it in turn after the Arabian Peninsula.

=== Possible tectonism ===
Research on the region was undertaken in 1997 and the individuality of the province better defined. An equatorial belt was noted with a crater age distinctly younger than the northern part of the province and of Noachis Terra to the south. This was interpreted as an "incipient back-arc system" provoked by the subduction of Mars lowlands under Arabia Terra during Noachian times. Regional fracture patterns were also explained in this manner, and the rotational instability of the planet as a cause was not supported. It contains extension tectonic features

=== Possible volcanism ===
A 2013 study proposed that a number of craters within Arabia Terra, including Eden Patera, Euphrates Patera, Siloe Patera, and possibly Semeykin crater, Ismenia Patera, Oxus Patera and Oxus Cavus, represent calderas formed by massive explosive volcanic eruptions (supervolcanoes) of Late Noachian to Early Hesperian age. Termed "plains-style caldera complexes", these very low relief volcanic features appear to be older than the large Hesperian-age shield volcanoes of Tharsis or Elysium. Eden Patera, for example, is an irregular, 55 by 85 km depression up to 1.8 km deep, surrounded by ridged basaltic plains. It contains three linked interior depressions, demarcated by arcuate scarps, that have terraces suggestive of lava lake drainage and faults suggestive of collapse. The features indicative of impact origin that would be expected in an impact crater of comparable diameter and depth are absent. The authors regard crustal thinning due to regional extension to be a more likely explanation for the origin of the volcanic activity than putative subduction. Rapid ascent of magma through the thin crust and a consequent relative absence of degassing may explain the more explosive eruption style associated with these paterae relative to that of the shield volcanoes. The eruptions would have contributed to the layered deposits of Arabia Terra, which are among the fine-grained deposits widespread in the equatorial regions of Mars. Total eruptive volumes of at least 4,600–7,200 km^{3} per caldera complex (over its history) were inferred.

== Recent meteoroid impact ==
A meteorite impacted in Arabia Terra some time between 30 June 2002 and 5 October 2003. A single small crater of about 22.6 meters (about 74 feet) in diameter is surrounded by light and dark-toned ejecta – indicating that this impact excavated to a depth where light colored strata exists. The crater occurs near 20.6 degrees north latitude, 356.8 degrees west longitude, in Arabia Terra. Images of the area show how the impact site appeared to the Mars Odyssey Thermal Emission Imaging System infrared instrument before and after the impact.

== In popular culture ==
In the 2011 novel The Martian by Andy Weir, the protagonist encounters a dust storm in Arabia Terra while traveling from Acidalia Planitia to Schiaparelli crater.

== Layers ==
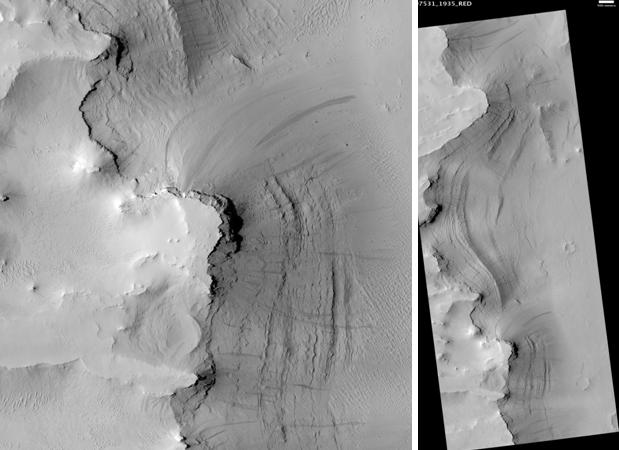
Tikhonravov Basin streaks, as seen by HiRISE. Scale bar is 500 m (1,600 ft) long

Many places on Mars show rocks arranged in layers. Rock can form layers in a variety of ways. Volcanoes, wind, or water can produce layers. Layers may be formed by groundwater rising up depositing minerals and cementing sediments. The hardened layers are consequently more protected from erosion. This process may occur instead of layers forming under lakes.

A detailed discussion of layering with many Martian examples can be found in Sedimentary Geology of Mars.

== Channels ==
Many places on Mars show channels of different sizes. Many of these channels probably carried water, at least for a time. One study that used HiRISE pictures found over 17,000 km of ancient river valleys in Arabia Terra. Many ancient river valleys have been determined to be relatively recent, according to research published in 2016 in the Journal of Geophysical Research: Planets. These valleys carried water into lake basins. One lake, nicknamed "Heart Lake," had a volume similar to Lake Ontario. The climate of Mars may have been such in the past that water ran on its surface. It has been known for some time that Mars undergoes many large changes in its tilt or obliquity because its two small moons lack the gravity to stabilize it, as the Moon stabilizes Earth; at times the tilt has even been greater than 80 degrees

== Upper Plains Unit ==
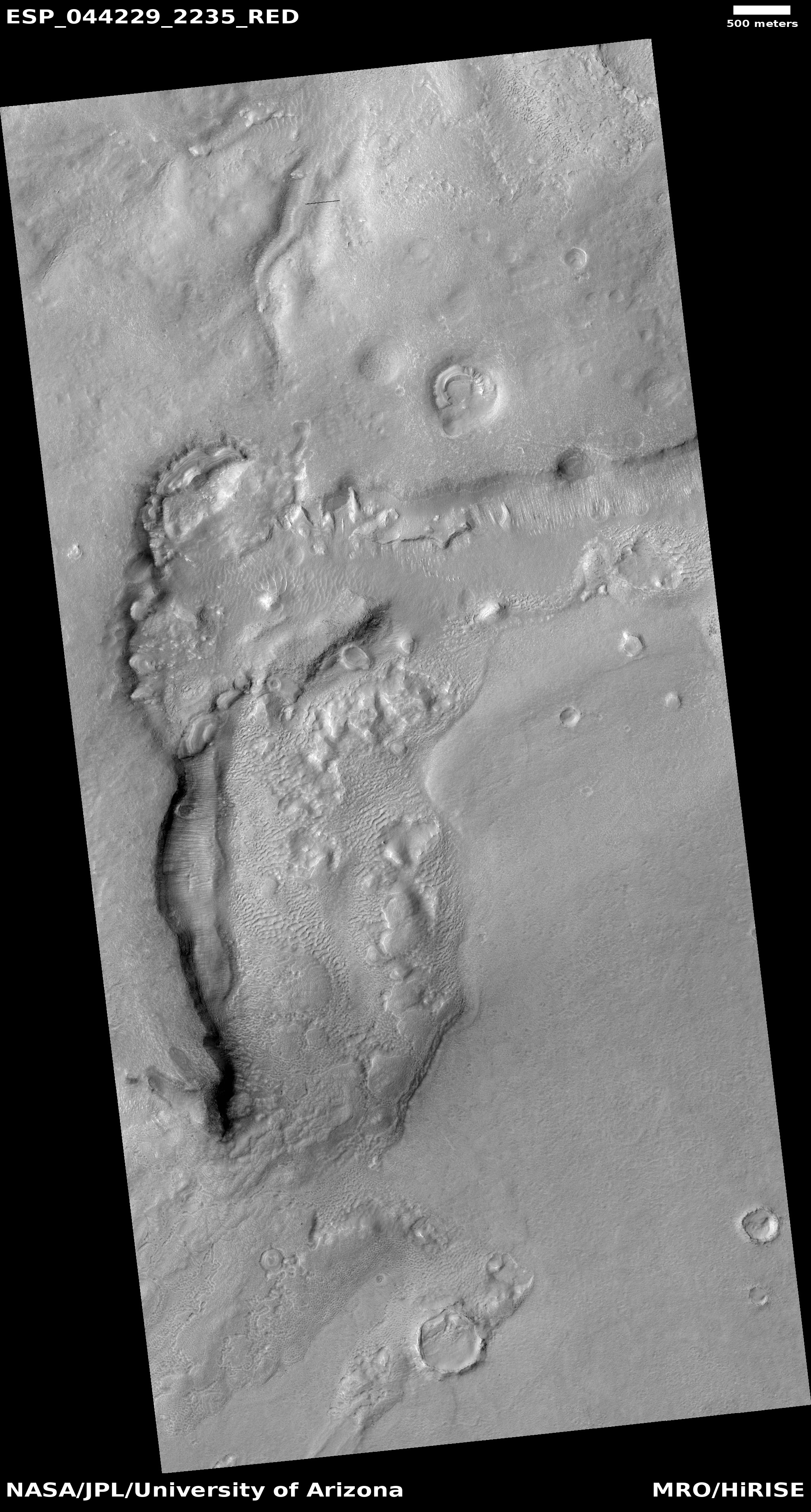
Wide view of dipping layers, upper plains unit, and brain terrain, as seen by HiRISE under HiWish program

Parts of northern Arabia Terra contains the upper plains unit. The Upper Plains Unit is the remnants of a 50–100 meter thick mantling in the mid-latitudes. It was first investigated in the Deuteronilus Mensae (Ismenius Lacus quadrangle) region, but it occurs in other places as well. The remnants consist of sets of dipping layers in craters and along mesas.

Some regions of the upper plains unit display large fractures and troughs with raised rims; such regions are called ribbed upper plains. Fractures are believed to have started with small cracks from stresses. Stress is suggested to initiate the fracture process since ribbed upper plains are common when debris aprons come together or near the edge of debris aprons—such sites would generate compressional stresses. Cracks exposed more surfaces, and consequently more ice in the material sublimates into the planet's thin atmosphere. Eventually, small cracks become large canyons or troughs.

This unit also degrades into brain terrain. Brain terrain is a region of maze-like ridges 3–5 meters high. Some ridges may consist of an ice core, so they may be sources of water for future colonists.

== Linear ridge networks ==
Linear ridge networks are found in various places on Mars in and around craters. Ridges often appear as mostly straight segments that intersect in a lattice-like manner. They are hundreds of meters long, tens of meters high, and several meters wide. It is thought that impacts created fractures in the surface, these fractures later acted as channels for fluids. Fluids cemented the structures. With the passage of time, surrounding material was eroded away, thereby leaving hard ridges behind. Since the ridges occur in locations with clay, these formations could serve as a marker for clay which requires water for its formation. Water here could have supported past life in these locations. Clay may also preserve fossils or other traces of past life.

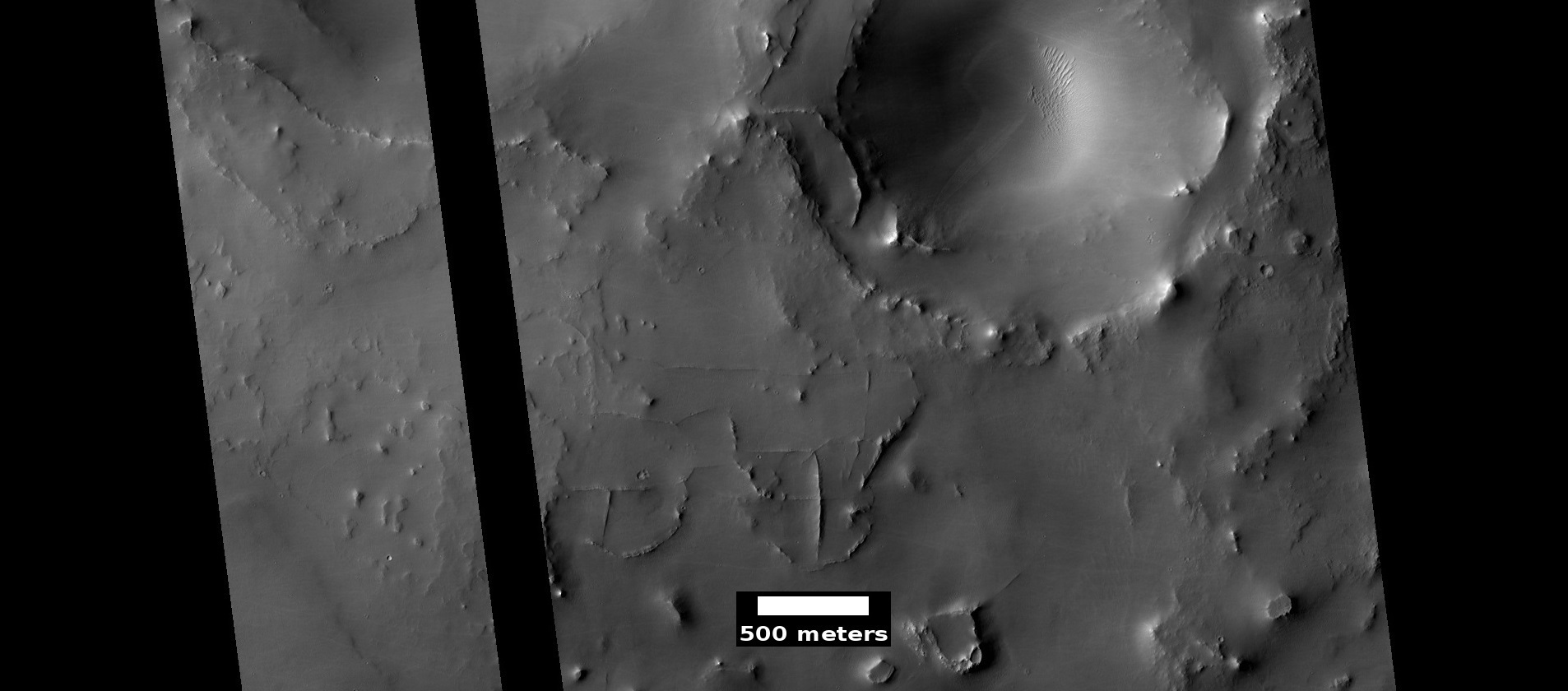
Linear ridge network, as seen by HiRISE under HiWish program Dark line is not part of the picture. Data was not gathered for that area.

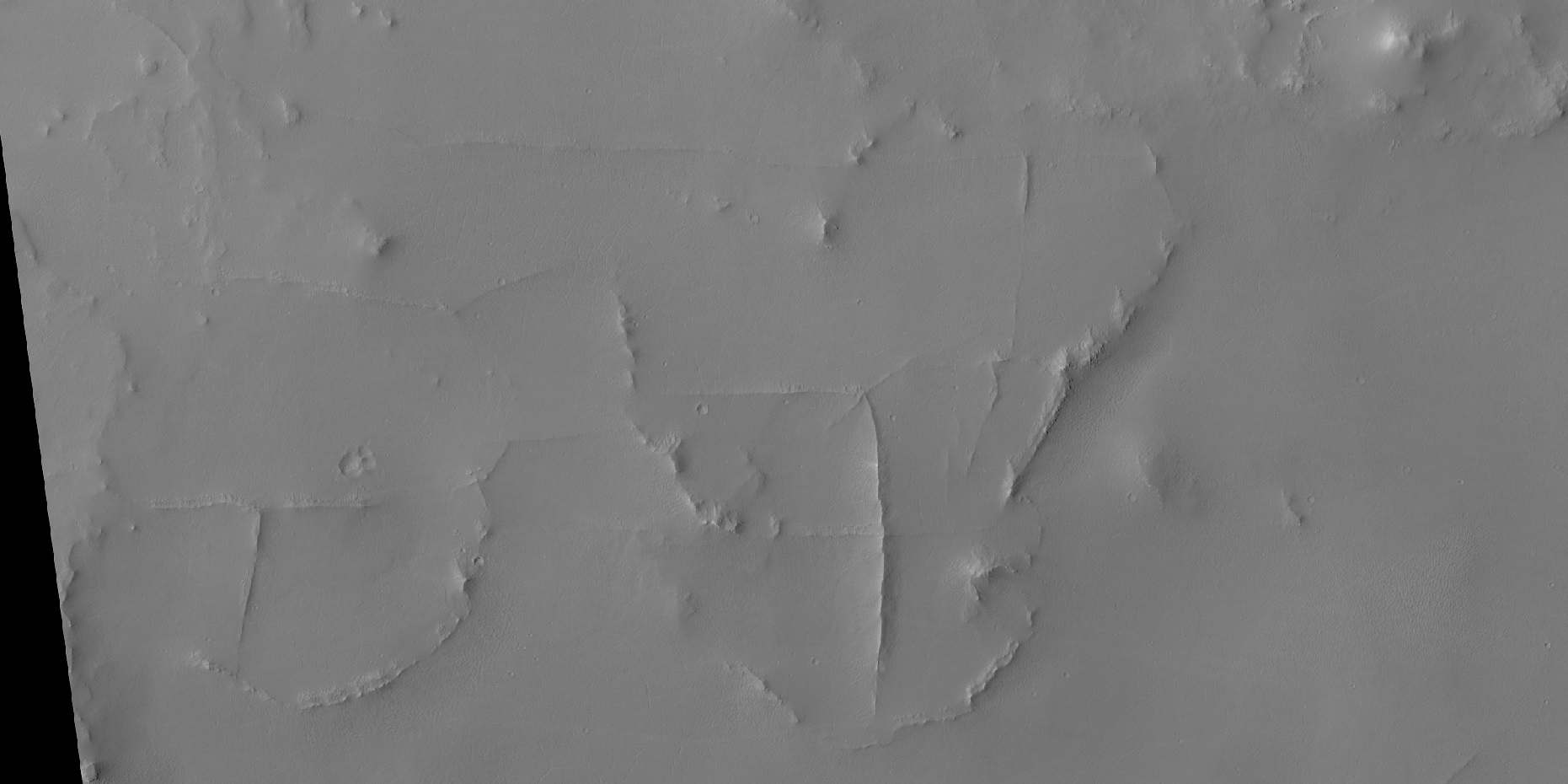
Enlargement of previous image of linear ridge network, as seen by HiRISE under HiWish program

== Gallery ==
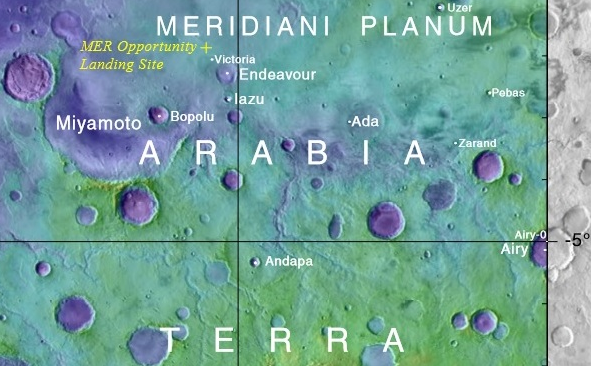
Annotated elevation map of Opportunity landing site and some surrounding craters including Endeavour and Miyamato

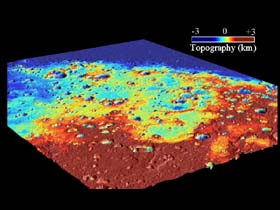
An oblique view of Arabia Terra produced by Mars Global Surveyor

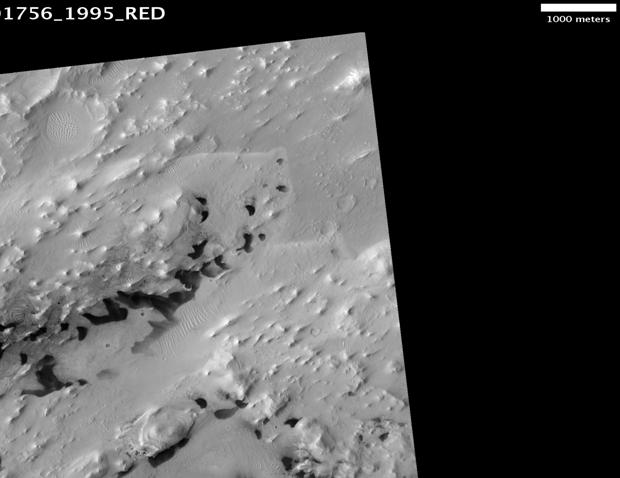
Pasteur Crater floor, as seen by HiRISE. The scale bar is 1,000 m (3,300 ft) long

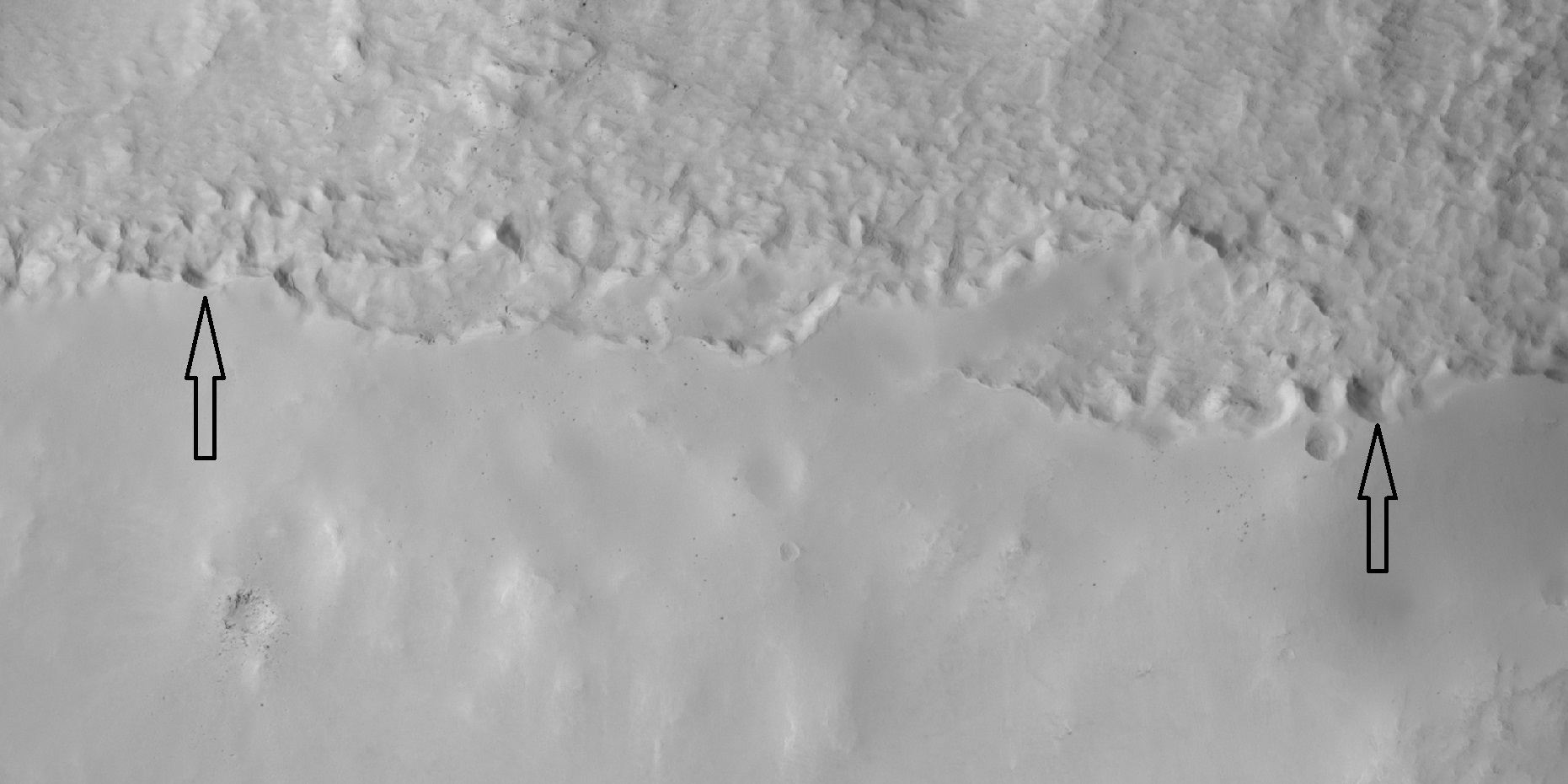
Close view of mantle, as seen by HiRISE under HiWish program Arrows show craters along edge which highlight the thickness of mantle.

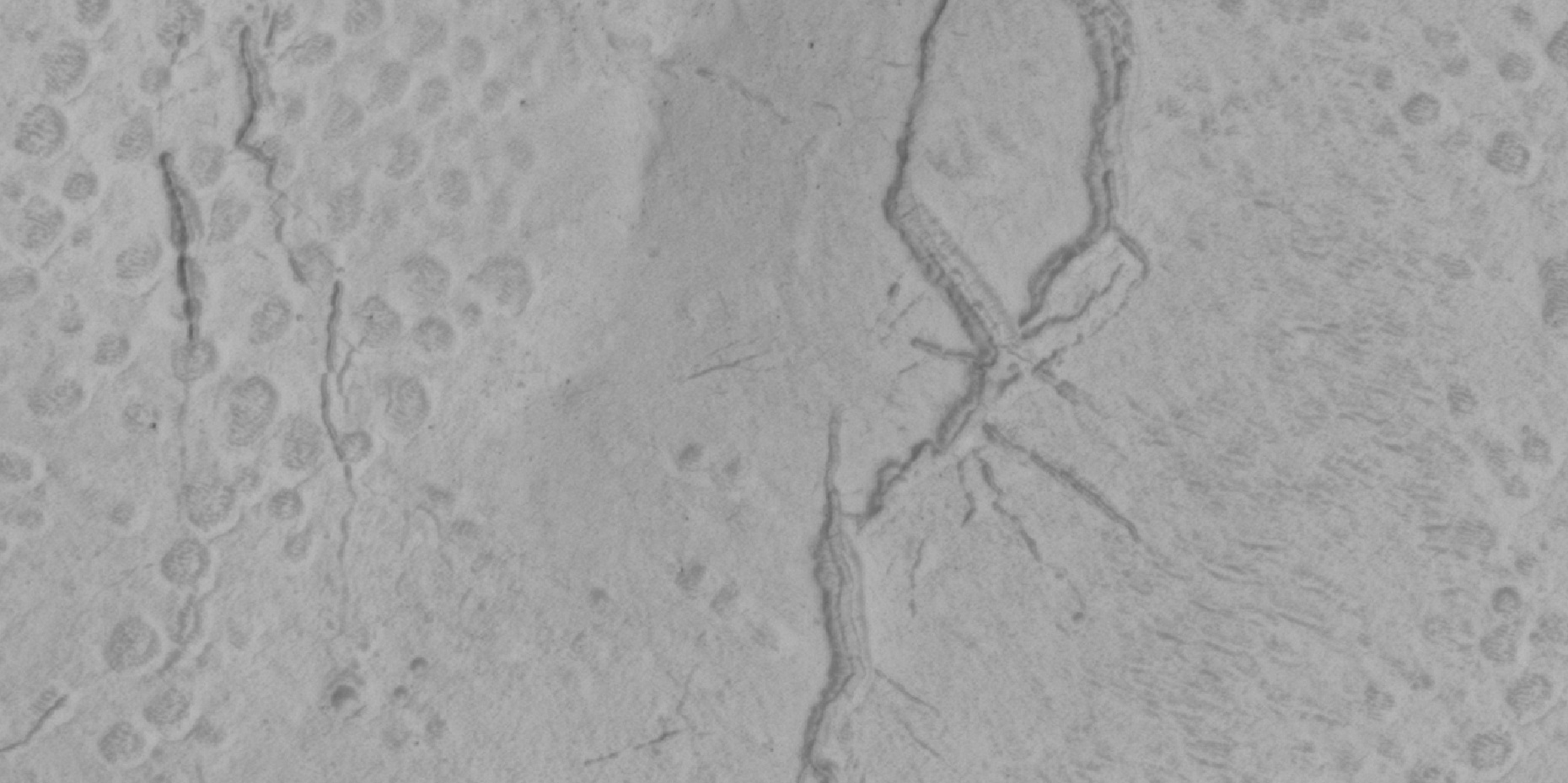
Pits and troughs, as seen by HiRISE under HiWish program Pits may have formed from water/ice leaving the ground.

== See also ==
- Climate of Mars
- Geography of Mars
- Geology of Mars
- Impact crater
- List of craters on Mars
- List of quadrangles on Mars
