= Xiao Zhao (crater) =

Crater on Mercury

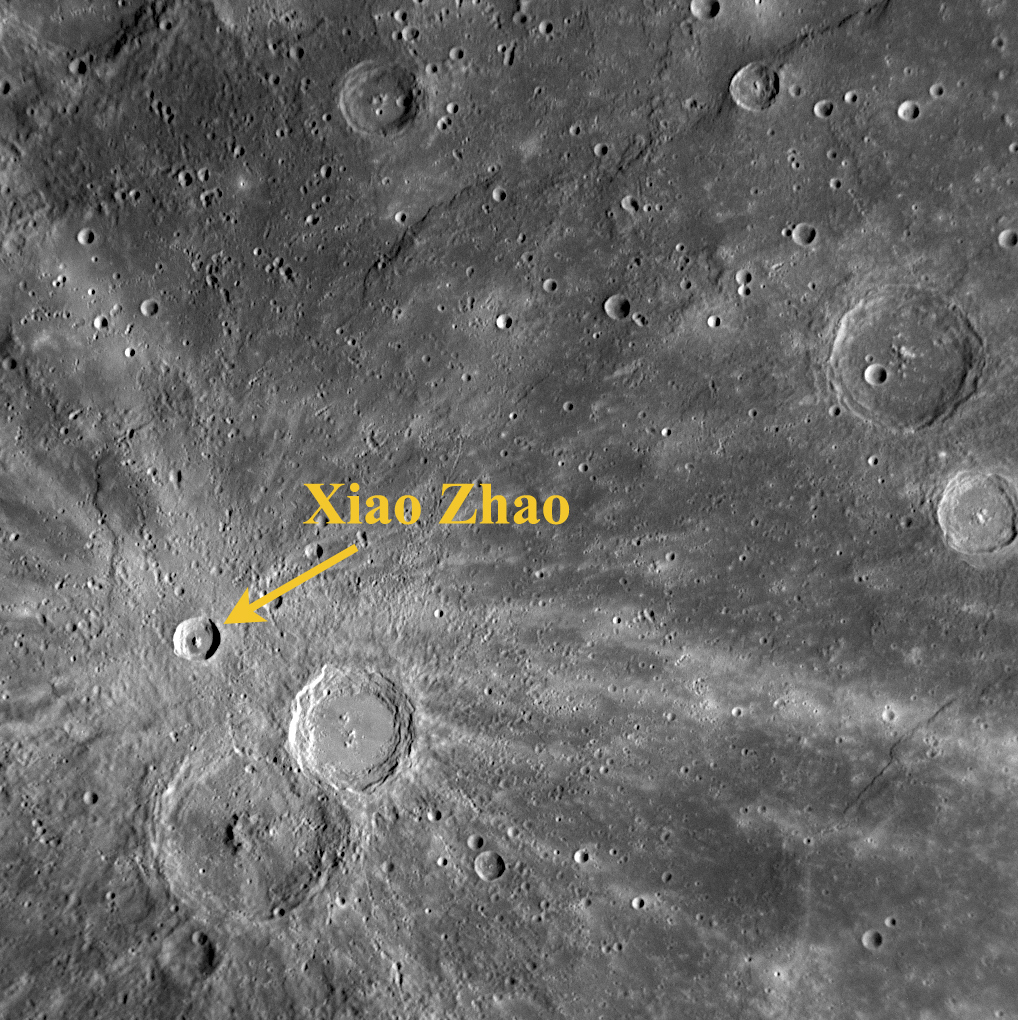
- MESSENGER image
- Feature type: Impact crater
- Location: Eminescu quadrangle, Mercury
- Coordinates: 10.58°N 236.16°W
- Diameter: 24 km (15 mi)
- Eponym: Xiao Zhao

Xiao Zhao crater is small in comparison with many other craters on Mercury. However, Xiao Zhao's long bright rays make it a readily visible feature. The fresh, bright rays, which were created by material ejected outward during the impact event that formed the crater, indicate that Xiao Zhao is a relatively young crater on Mercury's surface.

Hollows are present within Xiao Zhao and on the ejecta blanket near the rim. A confirmed dark spot is present in Xiao Zhao. This dark spot is associated with the hollows.

Xiao Zhao was named by the IAU in 2008 after the 12th-century Chinese painter Xiao Zhao. It is the only crater on Mercury which name starts with the letter "X".

Xiao Zhao is located near Eastman crater.

== Views ==
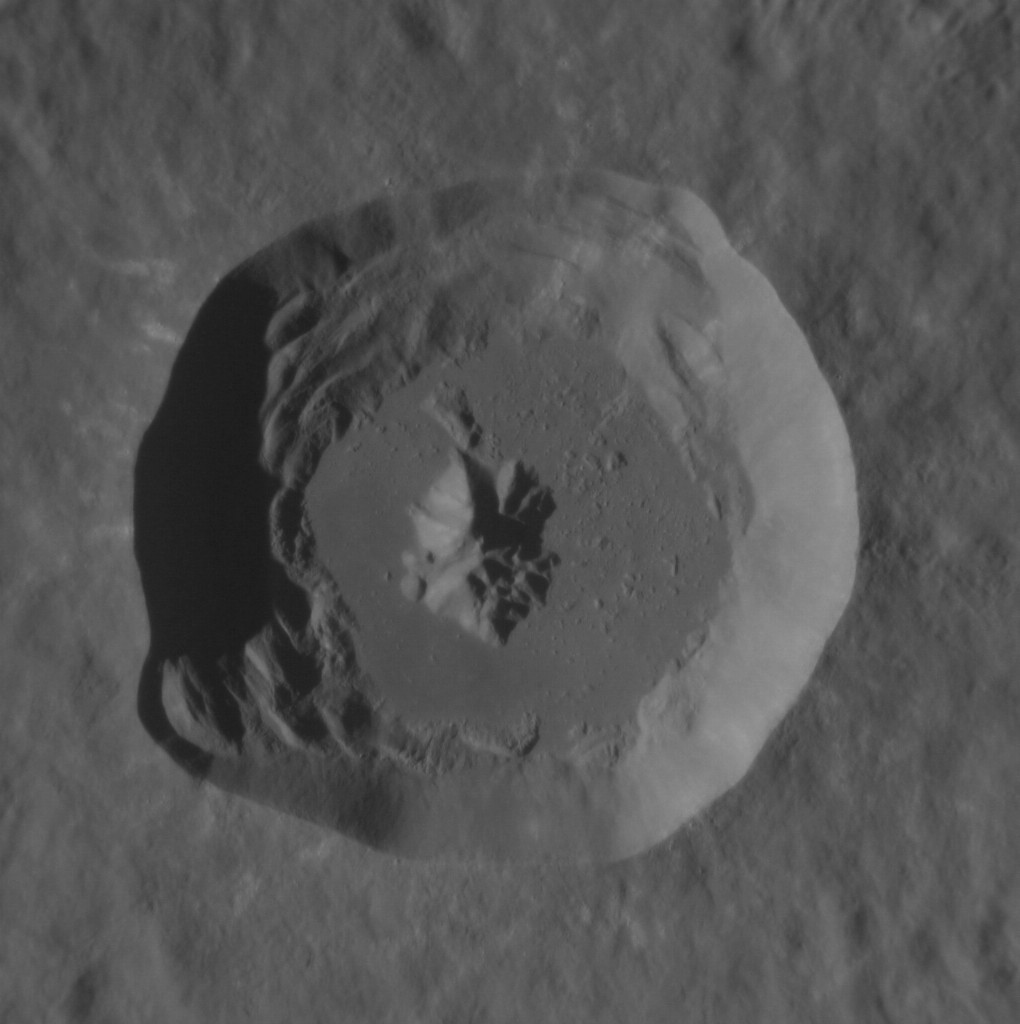
High-resolution image from MESSENGER at a low sun angle

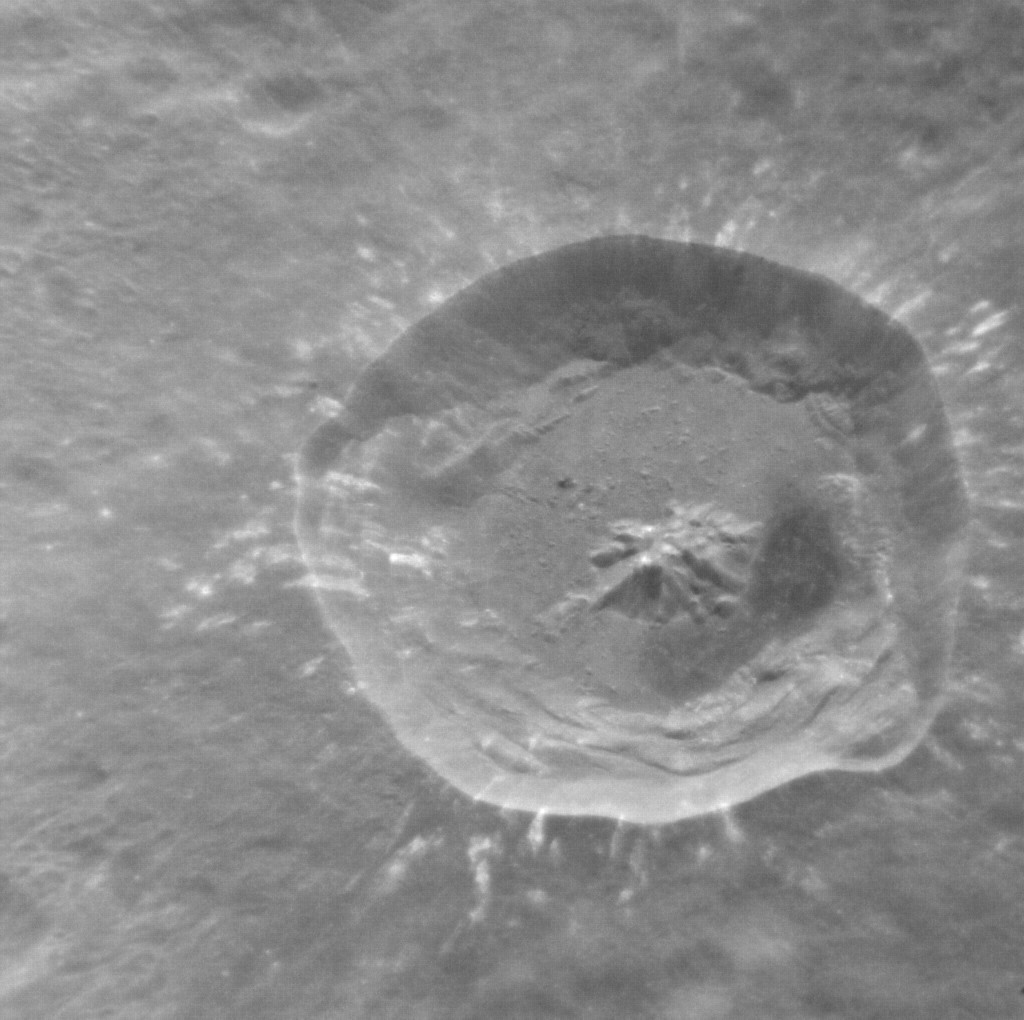
Oblique view at a high sun angle. The dark spot is clear below and to the right of the central peak.
