= Eastman (crater) =

Crater on Mercury

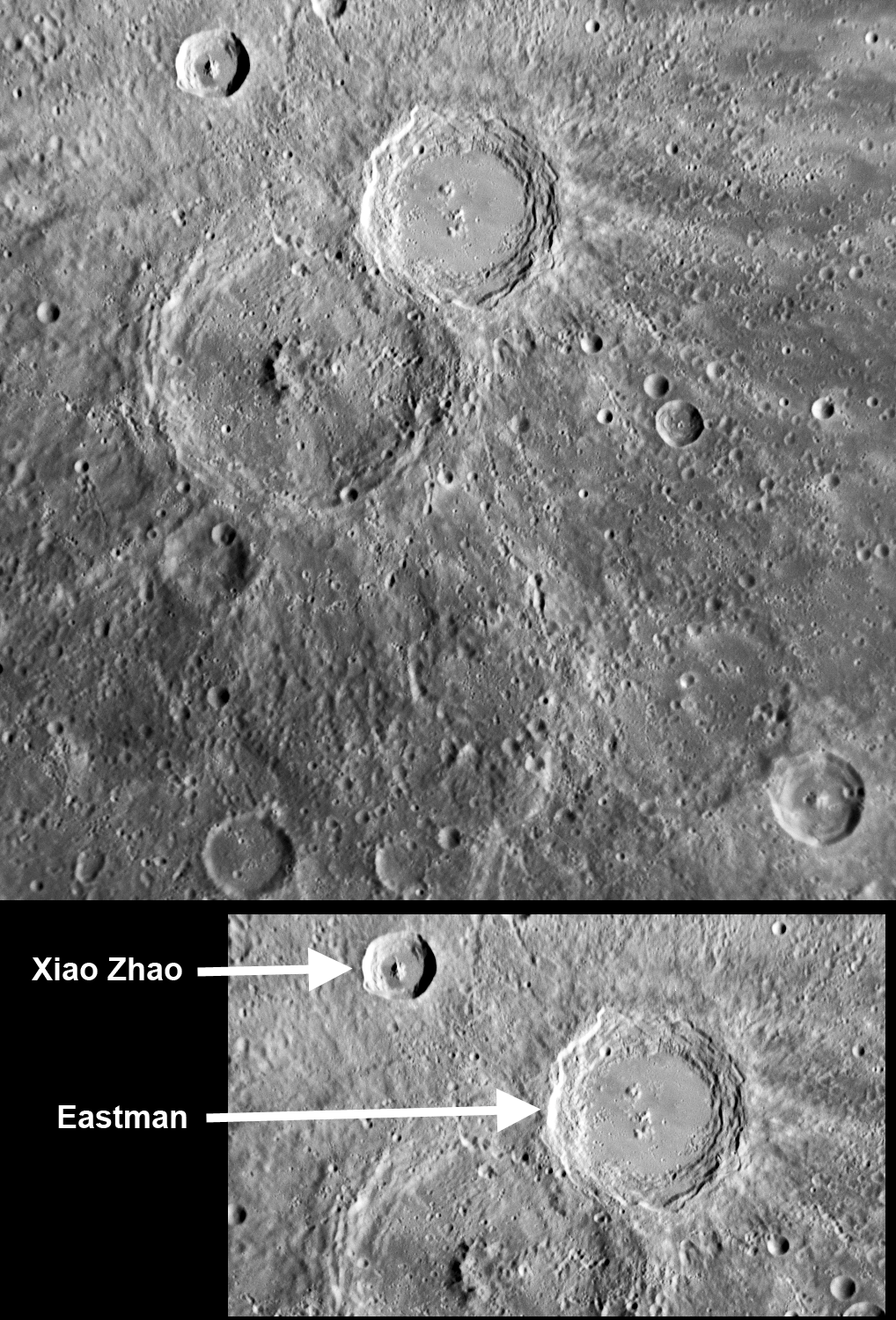
- MESSENGER image of Eastman and surrounding regions, with Eastman and neighboring Xiao Zhao labelled in the inset below
- Feature type: Central-peak impact crater
- Location: Eminescu quadrangle, Mercury
- Coordinates: 9.52°N 234.24°W
- Diameter: 67 km (42 mi)
- Eponym: Charles Eastman

Eastman is a crater on Mercury first seen by MESSENGER during the mission's first Mercury flyby. Eastman exhibits some features characteristic of a fresh, relatively young crater. The walls of Eastman have clearly visible terraces, and the central peak structure is well preserved. Eastman is located near Xiao Zhao crater.

It is named for Charles Eastman (Santee Dakota), known as one of the first Native American to graduate from an American medical school, Boston University, and to be licensed as a doctor. He worked on Sioux reservations in South Dakota, where he met and married Elaine Goodale from Massachusetts, who headed BIA schools. They had several children together. In later life he became known as an important author of the Native American culture, publishing nine books about his Santee Sioux childhood. The crater was named in July 2009 by the IAU.

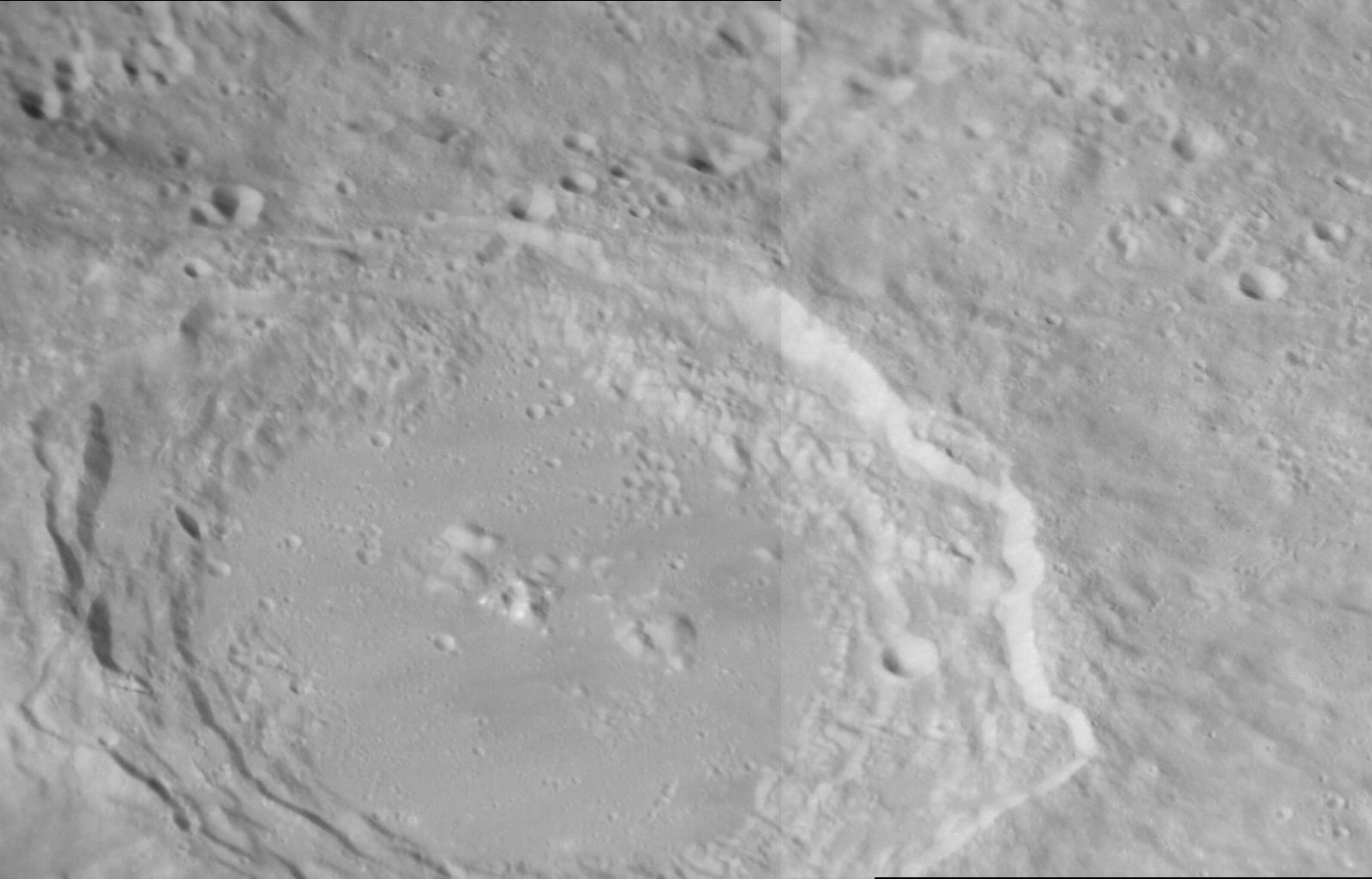
Oblique MESSENGER view
