= Alcott (crater) =

Crater on Venus

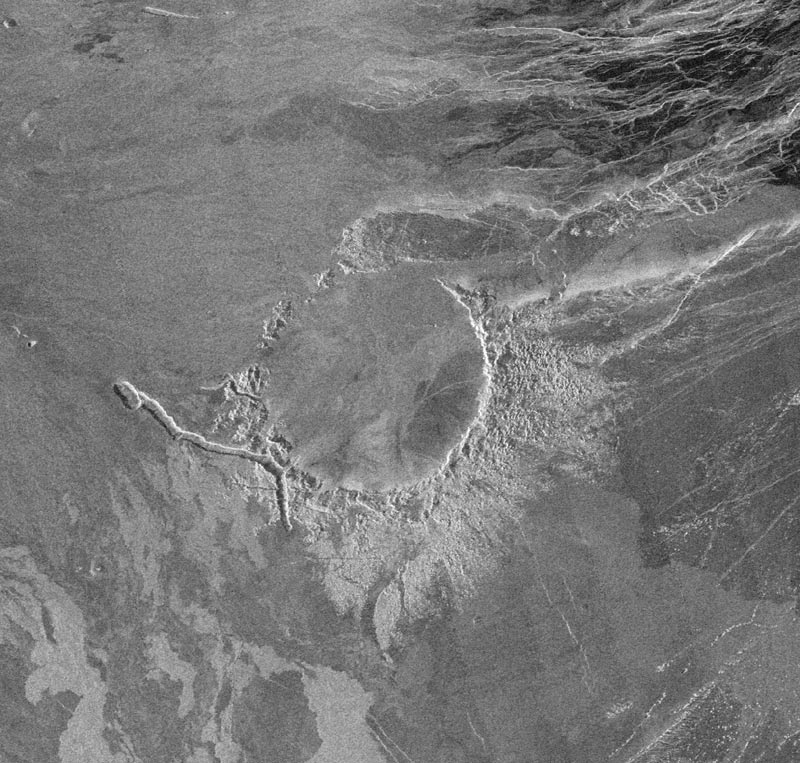
- Radar image of Alcott crater
- Location: Venus
- Coordinates: 59.5°S 354.4°E
- Diameter: 66 km
- Eponym: Louisa May Alcott

Alcott is an impact crater on Venus. Lava produced by a volcano at one point filled the crater and altered its rim, leaving only the radar-bright ejecta on the southeast rim of the crater. It is one of the few craters that has been changed by volcanic activity. It has a continuous ejecta radius of 39.2 km.

Alcot got its name from the American author Louisa May Alcott and was approved by the IAU in the year 1991.
