= Siloe Patera =

Patera on Mars

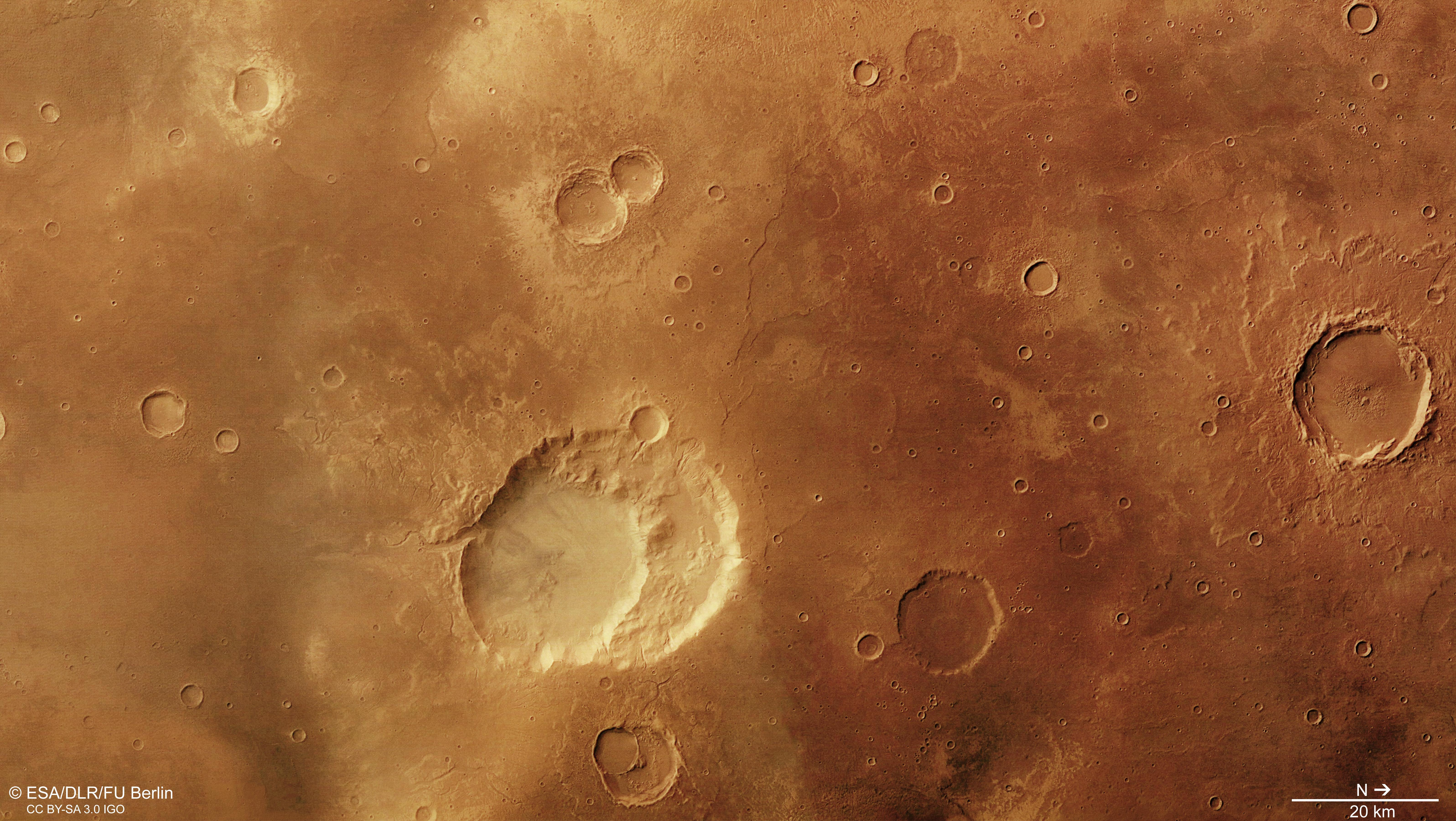
- Siloe Patera in Arabia Terra photographed by the HRSC aboard Mars Express
- Feature type: Patera
- Coordinates: 33.6°N 348.9°E
- Naming: Classical albedo feature name

Siloe Patera is a patera in the Arabia Terra area on the planet Mars. Lying south of the Martian dichotomy boundary, it measures 30 km (19 mi) x 40 km (25 mi) across. The patera is a collection of deep craters that extend approximately 1,750 m (5,740 ft) beneath the Arabia Terra surface. It features scarps, faults and steep crater walls. Extending 60 km (37 mi) from the southwestern part of the crater are thought to be lava or pyroclastic flows. One of several irregularly-shaped craters in the region, it is thought to be the caldera of a supervolcano, according to research by J. R. Michalski and J. E. Bleacher in 2013. The caldera formed when a volcanic structure collapsed. The scientists speculated that it is a caldera rather than an impact crater because of its irregular shape, the absence of a raised rim or central peak, and lack of impact ejecta. These explosive volcanoes erupted during the planet's first billion years. They are thought to have produced fine-grained sediments that deposited in layers.
