= Alcott =

Alcott is a surname of English origin. At the time of the British Census of 1881, its relative frequency was highest in Herefordshire (18.2 times the British average), followed by Warwickshire, Glamorgan, Sussex, Worcestershire, Hampshire, London and Kent. In all other British counties, its relative frequency was below national average. Alcott is traditionally mainly a West Midlands name.

The surname may refer to:

- Amos Bronson Alcott (1799–1888), American educator and writer
- Abigail May Alcott Nieriker (1840–1879), American artist, sister of Louisa
- Amy Alcott (born 1956), American golfer
- Chauncey Olcott (1858–1932), often spelled Alcott, American stage actor, songwriter and singer
- Chemmy Alcott, British alpine skier
- Clarence Alcott (1886–1957), American football player, coach and investment banker
- Dylan Alcott, Australian wheelchair tennis and basketball player
- Elizabeth Sewall Alcott (1835–1858), sister of Louisa
- Jack Alcott (born 1999), American actor and model
- John Alcott (1930–1986), English cinematographer
- Kathleen Alcott (born 1988), American novelist, short story writer and essayist
- Louisa May Alcott (1832–1888), daughter of Amos, author of Little Women
- Simon Alcott (born 1983), English retired rugby union player
- William Alcott (1798–1859), American educator, educational reformer, physician, vegetarian and author, cousin to Amos and Louisa

== See also ==
- Olcott (surname)
