= Orcus Patera =

Geographic region of Mars

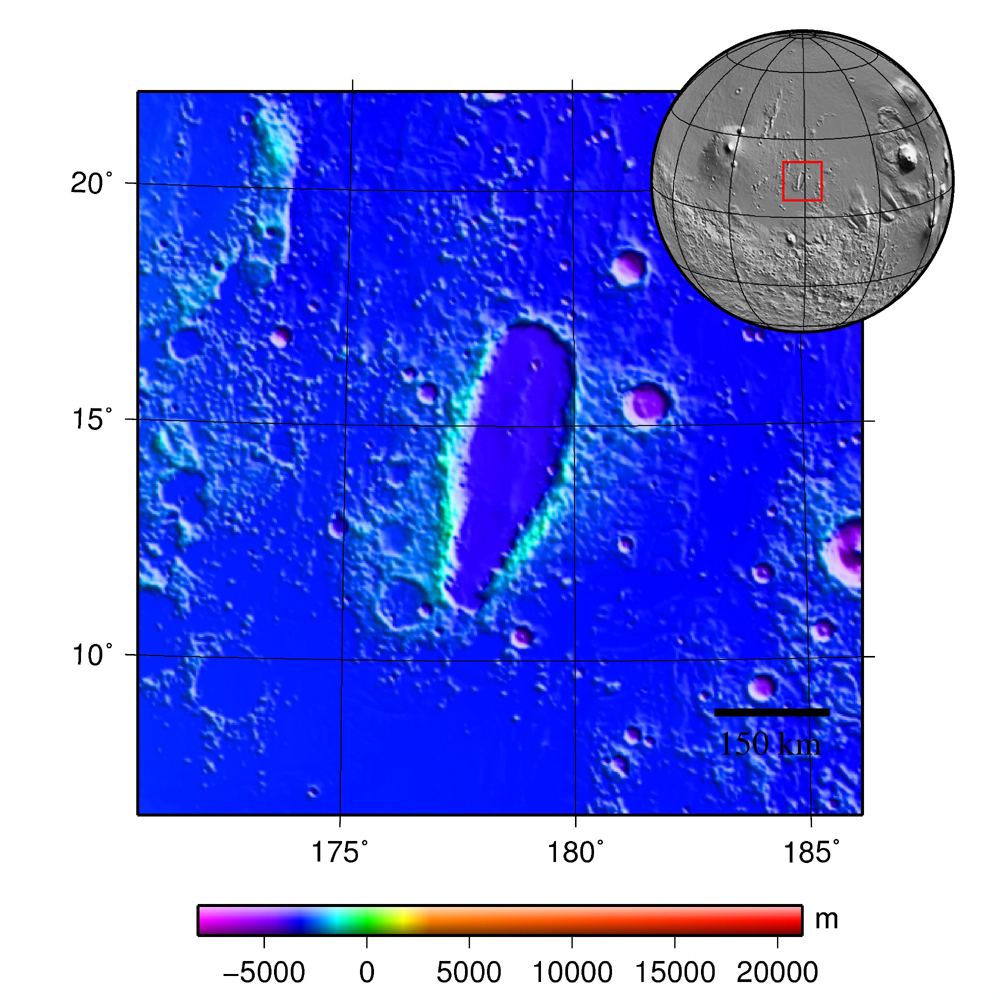
Elevation map centered on Orcus Patera. MOLA elevation map from the Mars Global Surveyor Mars orbiter

Orcus Patera is a region on the surface of the planet Mars first photographed by Mariner 4. Of unknown formation, whether by volcanic, tectonic, or cratering causes, the region includes a depression about 380 kilometres (240 miles) long, 140 kilometres (87 miles) wide, surrounded by a rim up to 1.8 kilometres (1 mile) high.

== Description ==
Orcus Patera was first imaged by Mariner 4. It is a depression about 380 kilometres (240 miles) long, 140 kilometres (87 miles) wide, and about 0.5 kilometres (1/3 mile) deep but with a relatively smooth floor. It has a rim up to 1.8 kilometres (1 mile) high.

It has experienced aeolian processes, and has some small craters and graben structures. However, it is not known how the patera originally formed. Theories include volcanic, tectonic, or cratering events. A study in 2000 that incorporated new results from Mars Global Surveyor along with older Viking data, did not come out clearly in favor of either volcanic or cratering processes.

Mars Express observed this region in 2005, yielding a digital terrain model and color pictures.

== Images ==
=== Viking ===
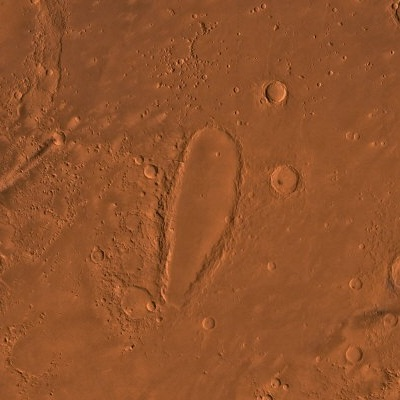
Orcus Patera by a Viking Orbiter. Orcus Patera is the elongated crater in the center. This is in the Elysium Planitia region.

=== Mars Express ===
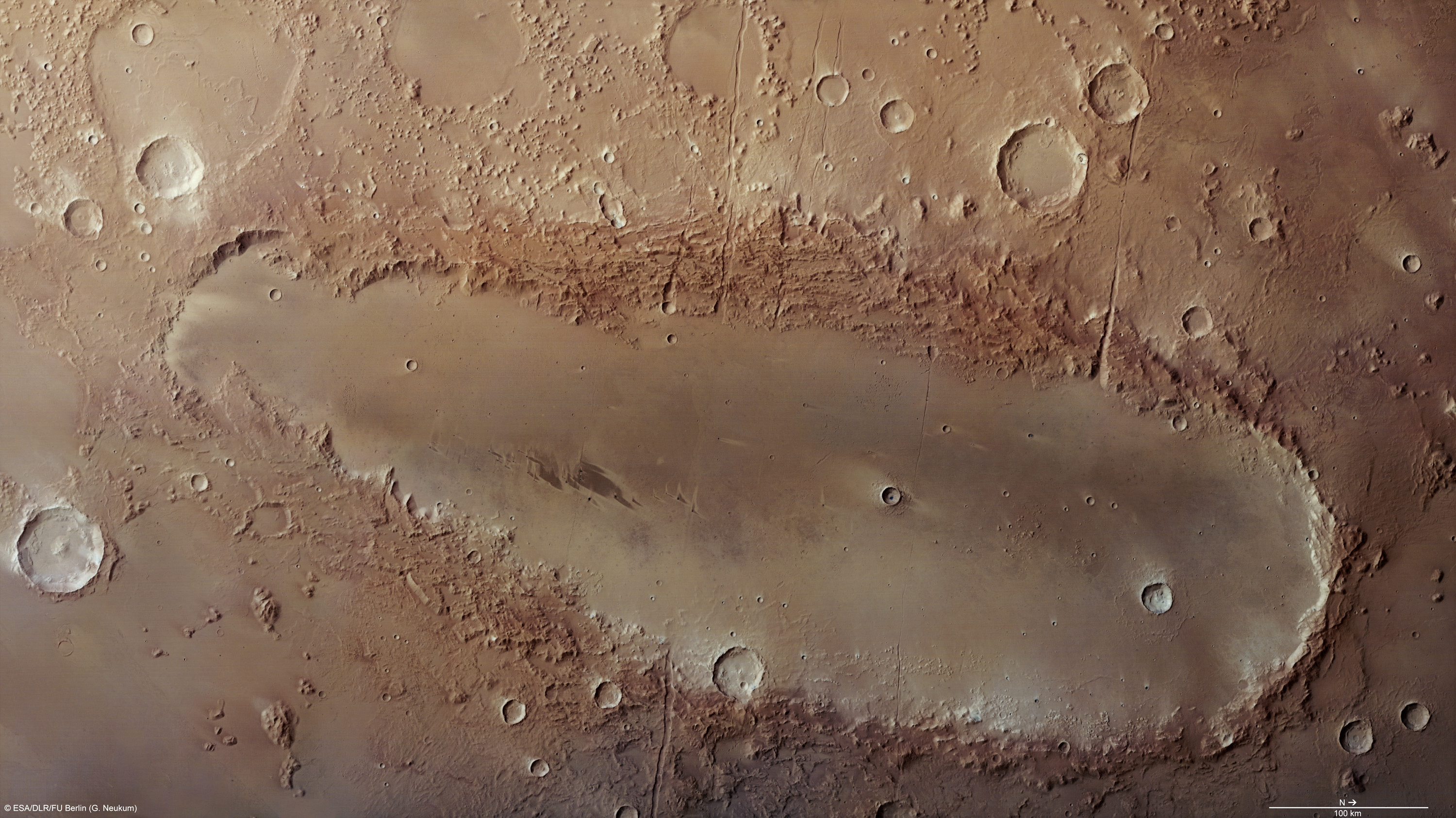
Mars Express HRSC natural color image of Orcus Patera
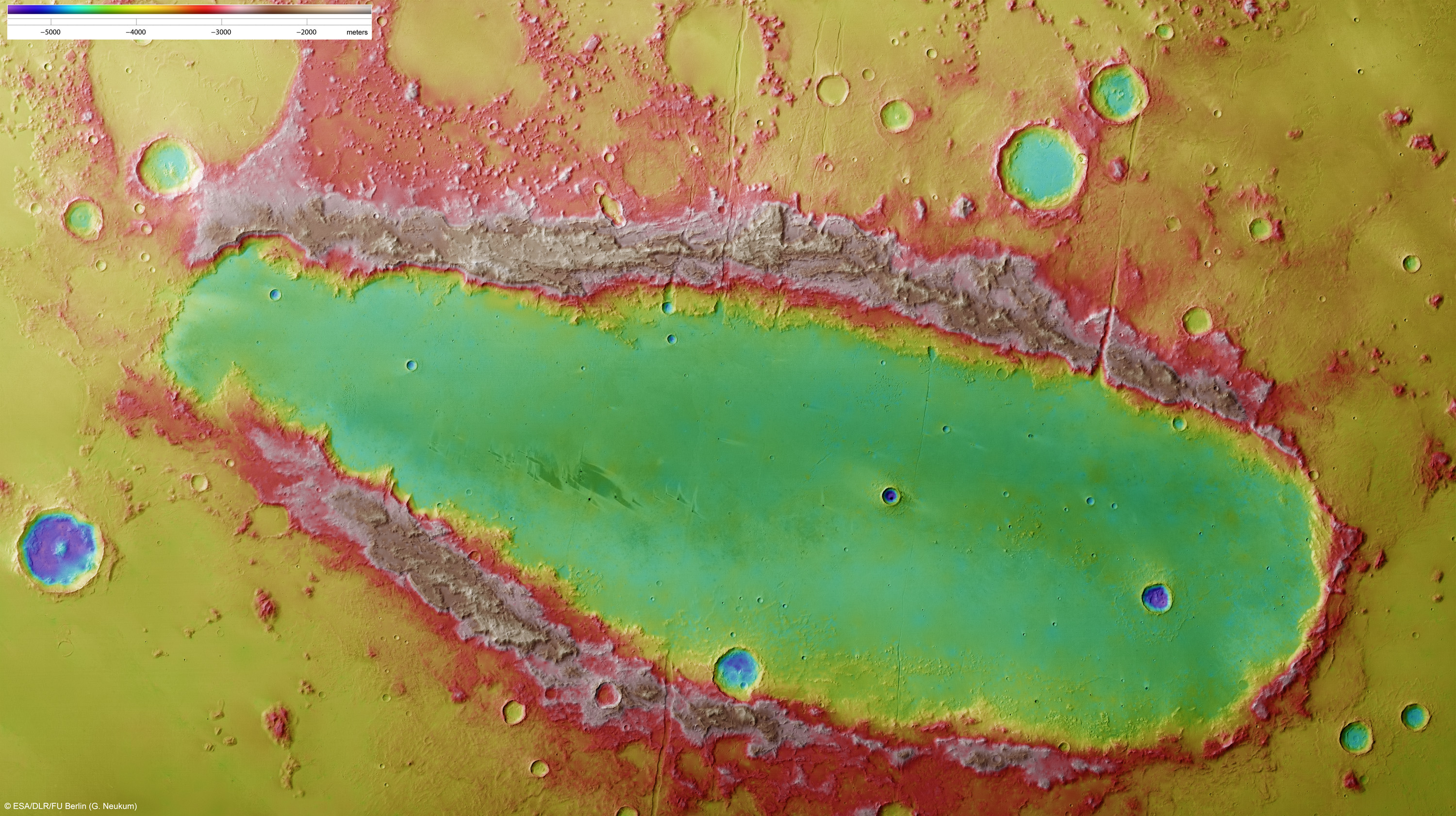
Mars Express HRSC topographic view of Orcus Patera with colors coding for elevation

== Location ==
Orcus Patera is west of Olympus Mons and east of Elysium Mons. It is about halfway between those two volcanoes, and east and north of Gale crater.

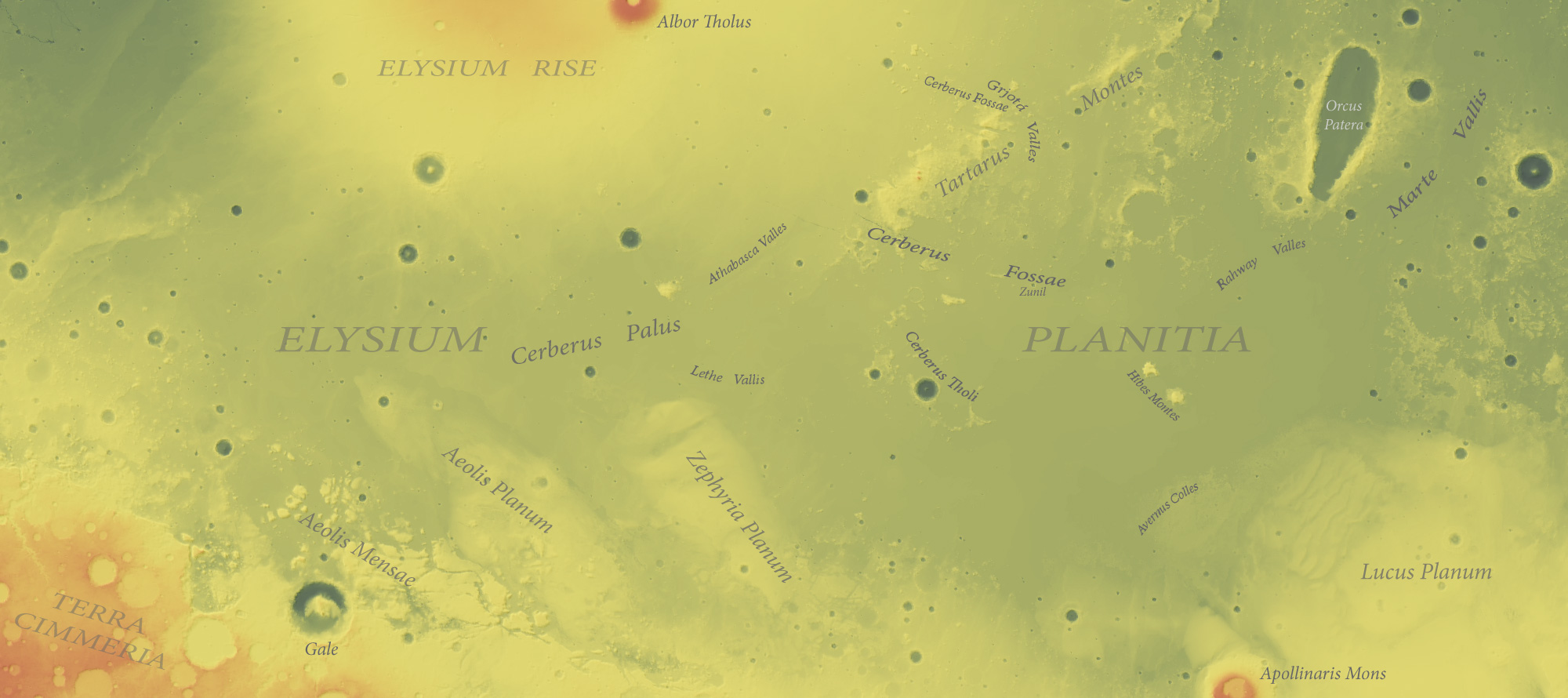
In this labeled elevation map (color corresponds to elevation in this view of Elysium Planitia), the location of Orcus Patera can be identified in upper right. Gale crater, where the Curiosity Mars rover landed in 2012 is in the lower left, and InSight landed north of Gale in 2018.

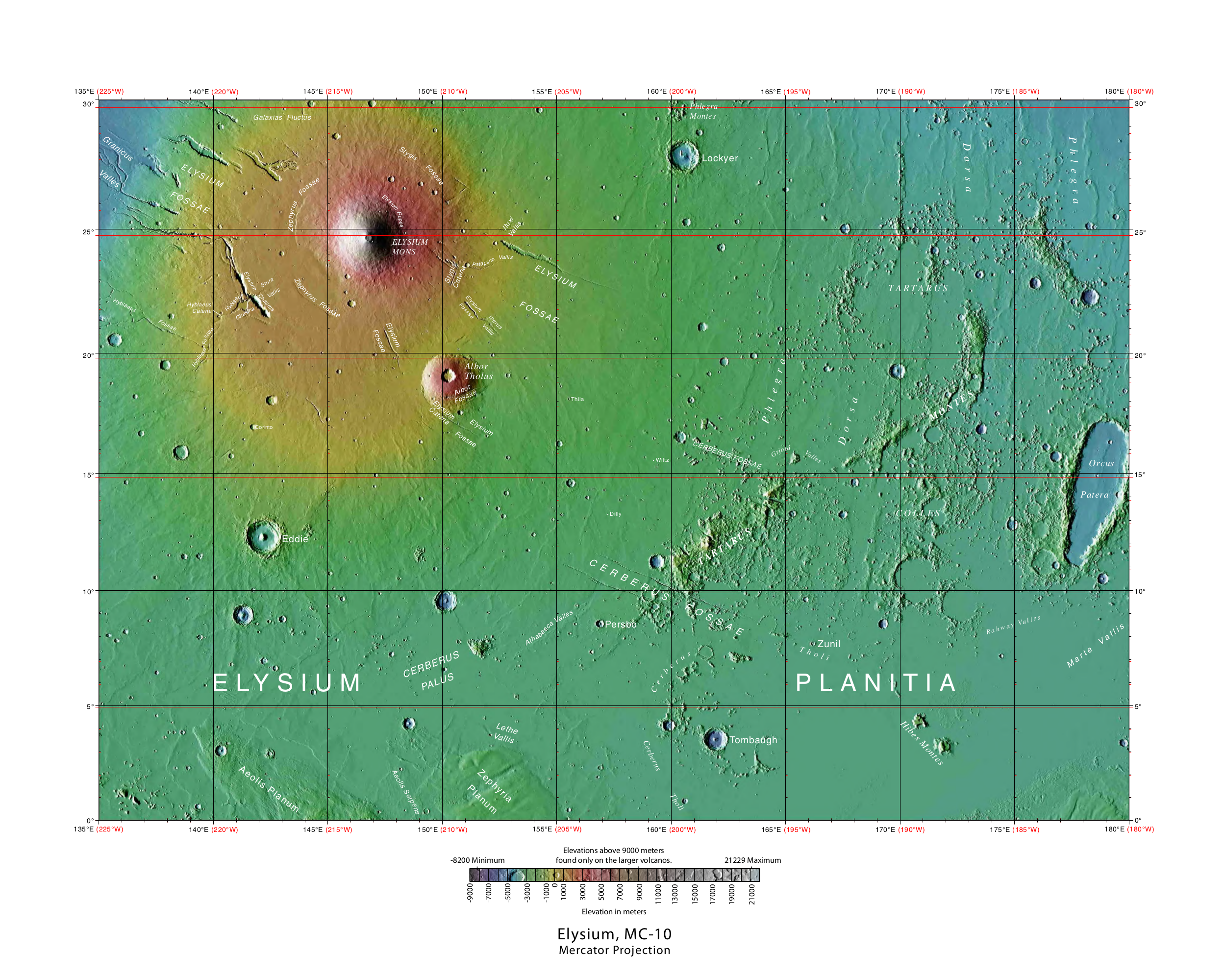
Orcus Patera in a wide view of Elysium Planitia quadrangle

== See also ==
- Marte Vallis
- Tartarus Colles
- Schiller (crater) (elongated Lunar feature)
- Eden Patera (suspect collapsed caldera or impact crater)
