= Olcott, West Virginia =

- Unincorporated community
- Location within West Virginia and the United States Olcott (the United States)
- Coordinates: 38°14′4″N 81°43′27″W
- Country: United States
- State: West Virginia
- County: Kanawha
- Elevation: 699 ft (213 m)
- Time zone: UTC-5 (Eastern (EST))
  - Summer (DST): UTC-4 (EDT)
- GNIS ID: 1544344

Olcott is an unincorporated community and coal town in Kanawha County, West Virginia, United States. Its post office is closed.

The community was named after one Mr. Olcott, the proprietor of a local mine.
