= Xiao Zhao (painter) =

Xiao Zhao (Hsiao Chao) was a Chinese painter active from 1130 to 1162, from Hu-tse, Shanxi. He was a pupil of Li Tang.

A crater on Mercury is named after him.

== Gallery ==
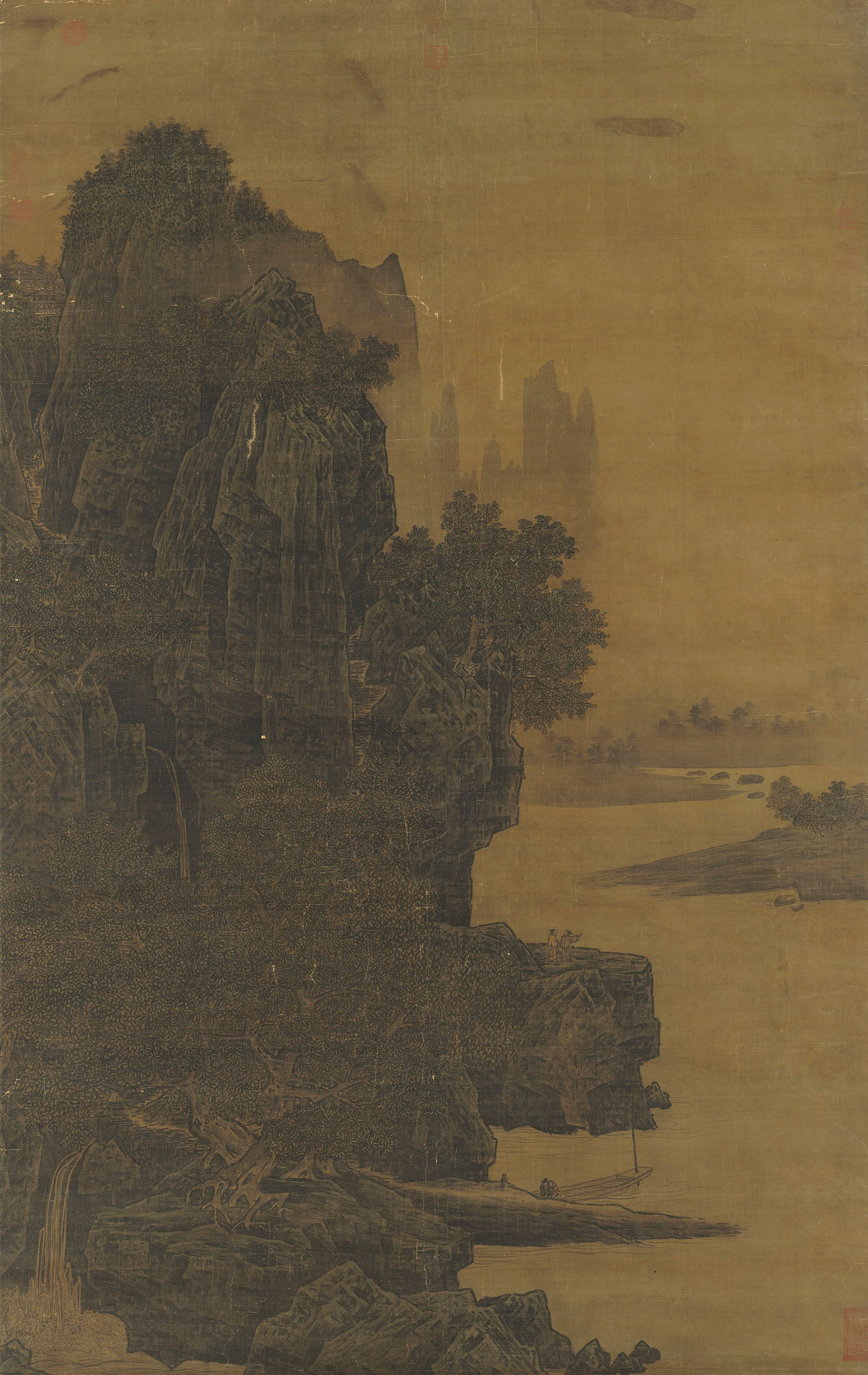
A Tower on the Halfway of A Mountain

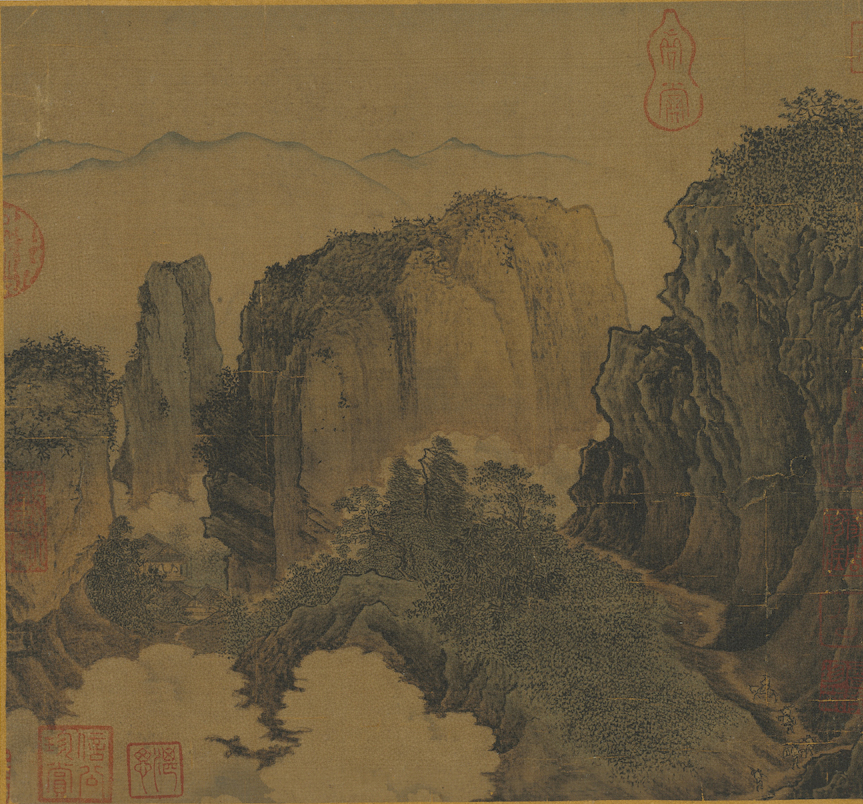
Travelers in a Mountain Pass

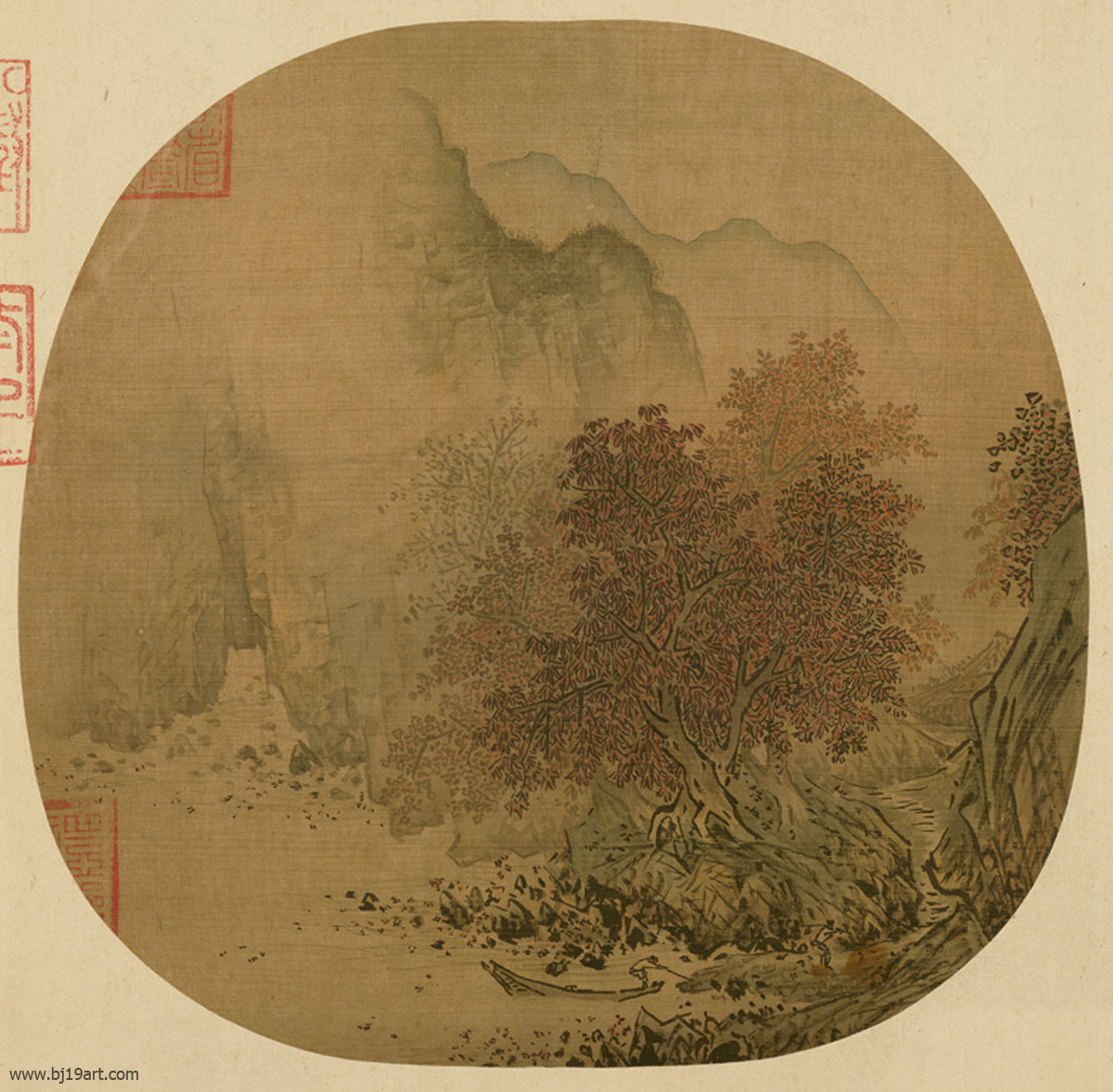
Mangrove Tree near the Mountain
