= Justice Olcott =

Justice Olcott may refer to:

- Peter Olcott (1733–1808), associate justice of the Vermont Supreme Court
- Simeon Olcott (1735–1815), chief judge of the Superior Court of New Hampshire
