= Ejecta =

Particles ejected from an area

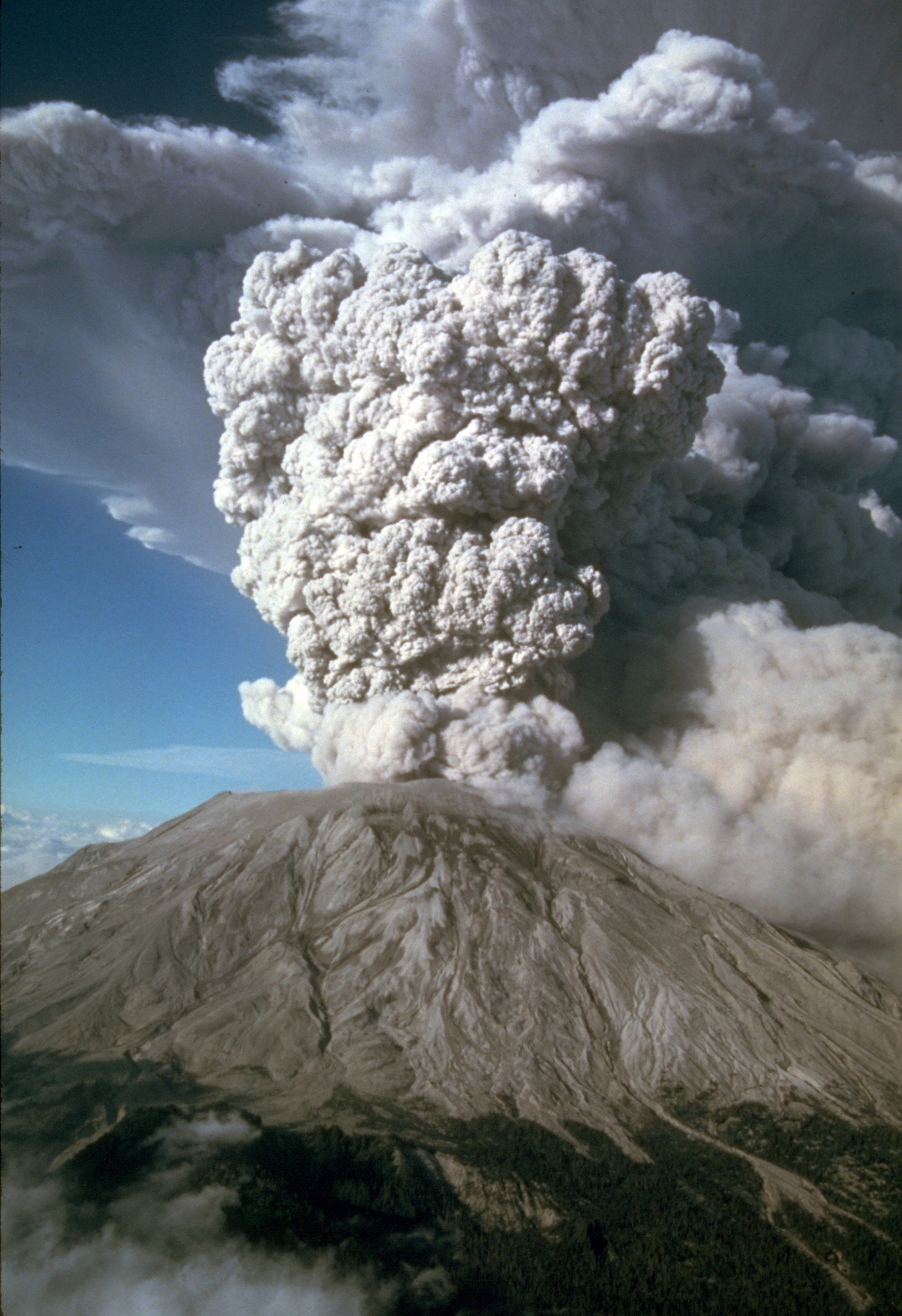
Mt. St Helens eruption plume on 22 July 1980, showing ejecta in the form of pyroclastic material (ash)

Ejecta (Latin for 'things thrown out'; sing. ejectum) are particles ejected from an area. In volcanology, in particular, the term refers to particles including pyroclastic materials (tephra) that came out of a volcanic explosion and magma eruption volcanic vent, or crater, has traveled through the air or water, and fell back to the ground surface or ocean floor.

== Volcanology ==
Typically in volcanology, ejecta is a result of explosive eruptions. In an explosive eruption, large amounts of gas are dissolved in extremely viscous lava; this lava froths to the surface until the material is expelled rapidly due to the trapped pressure. Sometimes in such an event a lava plug or volcanic neck forms from lava that solidifies inside a volcano's vent, causing heat and pressure to build up to an extreme with no way to escape. When the blockage breaks and cannot sustain itself any longer, a more violent eruption occurs, which allows materials to be ejected out of the volcano.

Ejecta can consist of:

- juvenile particles – (fragmented magma and free crystals)
- cognate or accessory particles – older volcanic rocks from the same volcano
- accidental particles – derived from the rocks under the volcano

These particles may vary in size; tephra can range from ash (<1/10 inch [0.25 cm]) or lapilli (little stones from 1/10 to 2 1/2 inches or 0.25 to 6.35 centimetres) to volcanic bombs (>2.5 inches [6.4 cm]).

== Planetary geology ==
In planetary geology, the term "ejecta" includes debris ejected during the formation of an impact crater.

When an object massive enough hits another object with enough force, it creates a shockwave that spreads out from the impact. The object breaks and excavates into the ground and rock, at the same time spraying material known as impact ejecta. This ejecta is distributed outward from the crater's rim onto the surface as debris; it can be loose material or a blanket of debris, which thins at the outermost regions.

Ejecta features are classified based on their distance from the impact crater, the appearance of the ejected material, and the geomorphological characteristics of the terrain. Some common ejecta features include ejecta blankets, radial and concentric ejecta patterns, and secondary craters.

Ejecta Blankets: Ejecta blankets are the continuous layer of debris that surrounds the impact crater, thinning outwards from the crater's rim. The composition of the ejecta blanket can provide valuable information about the geological composition of the impacted surface and the projectile that caused the impact. The distribution and morphology of the ejecta blanket can also provide insight into the impact angle and the dynamics of the ejecta emplacement process.

Radial and Concentric Ejecta Patterns: Radial ejecta patterns are characterized by the outward distribution of ejecta from the crater in a series of rays or streaks. These rays are often more prominent in craters formed on solid surfaces, such as the Moon or Mercury. Concentric ejecta patterns are characterized by the presence of multiple, circular layers of ejecta surrounding the impact crater. These patterns are commonly observed on icy surfaces, such as the moons of Jupiter and Saturn, and are indicative of the presence of subsurface volatiles, like water or other ices.

If enough ejecta are deposited around an impact crater, it can form an ejecta blanket; this blanket is full of dust and debris that originated from the initial impact. The size of this impact crater along with the ejecta blanket can be used to determine the size and intensity of the impacting object. On earth, these ejecta blankets can be analyzed to determine the source location of the impact.

A lack of impact ejecta around the planet Mars's surface feature Eden Patera was one of the reasons for suspecting in the 2010s that it is a collapsed volcanic caldera and not an impact crater.

== Astronomy and heliophysics ==
In astrophysics or heliophysics, ejecta refers to material expelled in a stellar explosion as in a supernova or in a coronal mass ejection (CME).

== Artificial ==
Beside material launched by humans into space with a range of launch systems, some instances particularly nuclear produce artificial ejecta, like in the case of the Pascal-B test which might have ejected an object into space with a speed exceeding Earth's escape velocity.
