= Eden Patera =

Feature located in the Mare Acidalium quadrangle on the planet Mars

- Eden Patera based on THEMIS day-time image
- Feature type: Patera
- Coordinates: 33.6°N 348.9°E
- Naming: Classical albedo feature name

Eden Patera is a feature located in the Mare Acidalium quadrangle on the planet Mars. In October 2013 the feature gained some attention when it was speculated it may be a supervolcano rather than an impact crater, according to research from the Planetary Science Institute in Tucson, led by Joseph R. Michalski. The research postulated the crater was formed by the volcano's caldera collapsing, rather than from an impact. Some of the reasons for suspecting that Eden Patera is a collapsed caldera rather than an impact crater are its irregular shape, an apparent lack of a raised rim or central peak, and lack of impact ejecta.

== See also ==
- Orcus Patera (another mysterious patera)
