= Olcott (surname) =

Olcott is a surname. Notable people with the surname include:

- Ben W. Olcott (1872–1952), American politician from Oregon
- Charles S. Olcott (1864–1935), American non-fiction writer
- Chauncey Olcott (1858–1932), American stage actor and songwriter
- Frederic P. Olcott (1841–1909), American banker and politician
- Henry Steel Olcott (1832–1907), co-founder of the Theosophical Society
- J. Van Vechten Olcott (1856–1940), American politician
- James B. Olcott (1830–1910), American farmer and agronomist
- Martha Brill Olcott (born 1949), American expert on Central Asian and the Caspian
- Mike Olcott, American politician
- Sidney Olcott (1873–1949), Canadian film producer, director, actor and screenwriter
- Simeon Olcott (1735–1815), American politician
- William J. Olcott (1862–1935), American mining engineer and executive
- William M. K. Olcott (1862–1933), American lawyer and politician from New York
- William Tyler Olcott (1873–1936), American lawyer and amateur astronomer
