= Ameghino (crater) =

Crater on the Moon

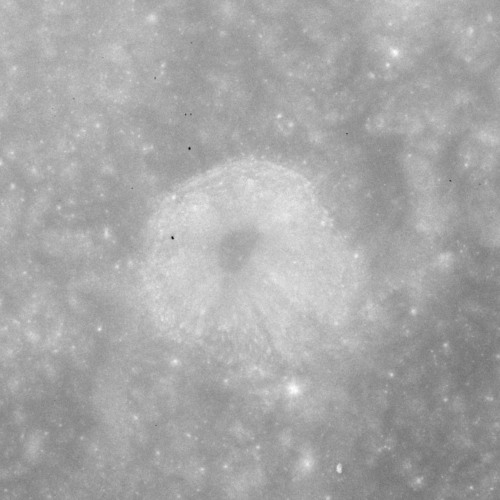
- Apollo 15 image
- Coordinates: 3.30°N 57.04°E
- Diameter: 9.20 km (5.72 mi)
- Depth: Unknown
- Colongitude: 303° at sunrise
- Eponym: Florentino Ameghino

Ameghino is a lunar impact crater located to the north of the Sinus Successus, a bay in the northeast part of Mare Fecunditatis. The impact dates from the Imbrian epoch, and it occurred in ejecta from the Crisium basin formation. Less than 15 kilometers to the northwest of Ameghino were the landing sites of the Soviet Luna 18 and Luna 20 probes.

This formation was designated Apollonius C before being given a proper name by the IAU in 1976, in honour of the Argentine scientific and paleontologist Florentino Ameghino (1853 – 1911). Apollonius itself is located to the east-northeast.
