= Apollonius (crater) =

Crater on the Moon

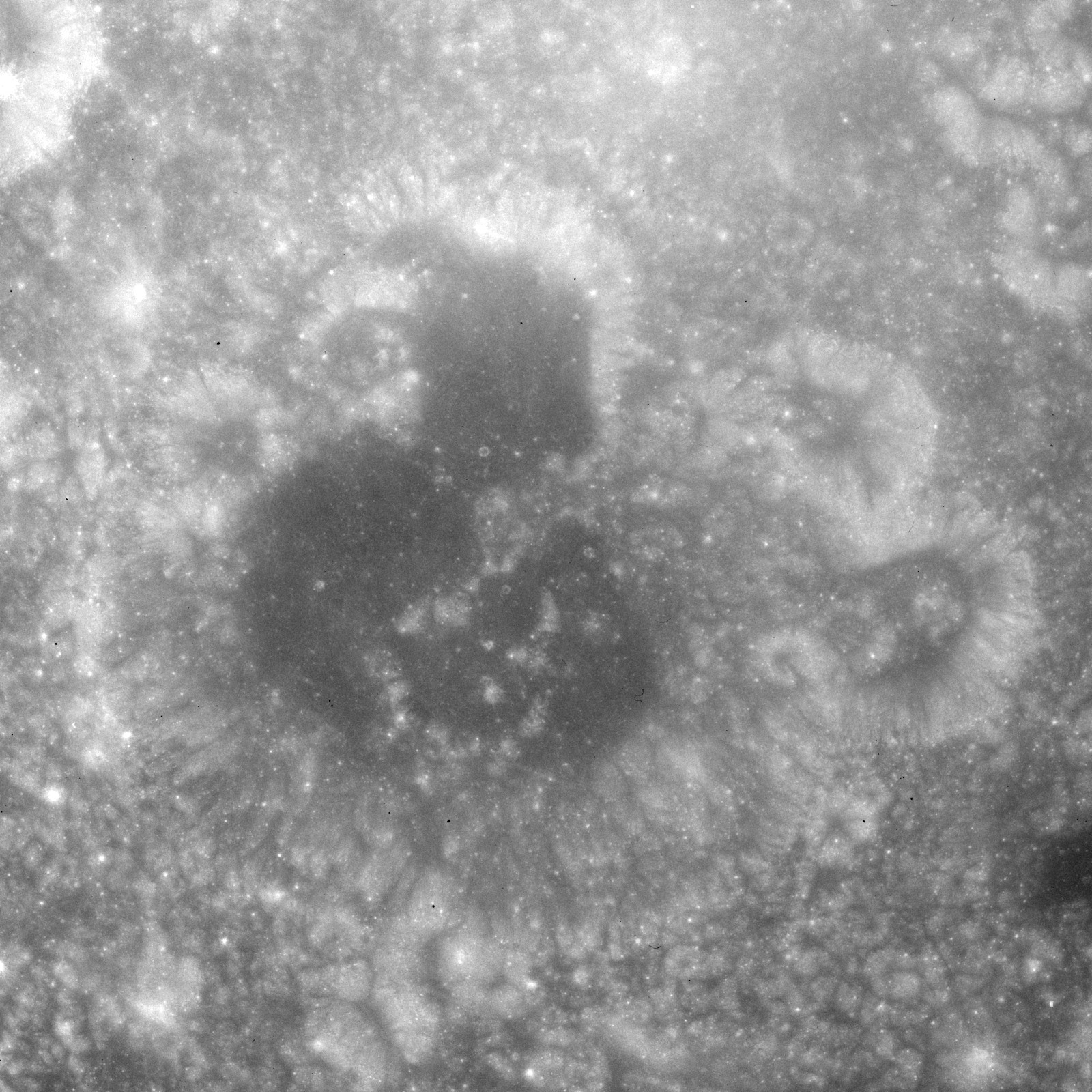
- Apollo 15 image
- Coordinates: 4.51°N 61.96°E
- Diameter: 50.66 km (31.48 mi)
- Depth: 2.75 km
- Colongitude: 299° at sunrise
- Eponym: Apollonius of Perga

Apollonius is a lunar impact crater located near the eastern limb of the Moon. It lies in the region of uplands to the west of Mare Undarum and northeast of the Sinus Successus on the Mare Fecunditatis. It is southwest of the crater Firmicus, and north of Condon.

The outer rim of Apollonius is somewhat worn and is overlain by a pair of small craters (including Apollonius E) across the western wall. The nearly flat interior floor has a low albedo and has been covered by lava. It lacks a central peak or notable small craters across the bottom.

This crater was named after Greek mathematician Apollonius of Perga (c. 262–190 B.C.). It was formerly adopted by the International Astronomical Union in 1935. The name was introduced into lunar nomenclature by Johann Madler during the 19th century.

== Satellite craters ==
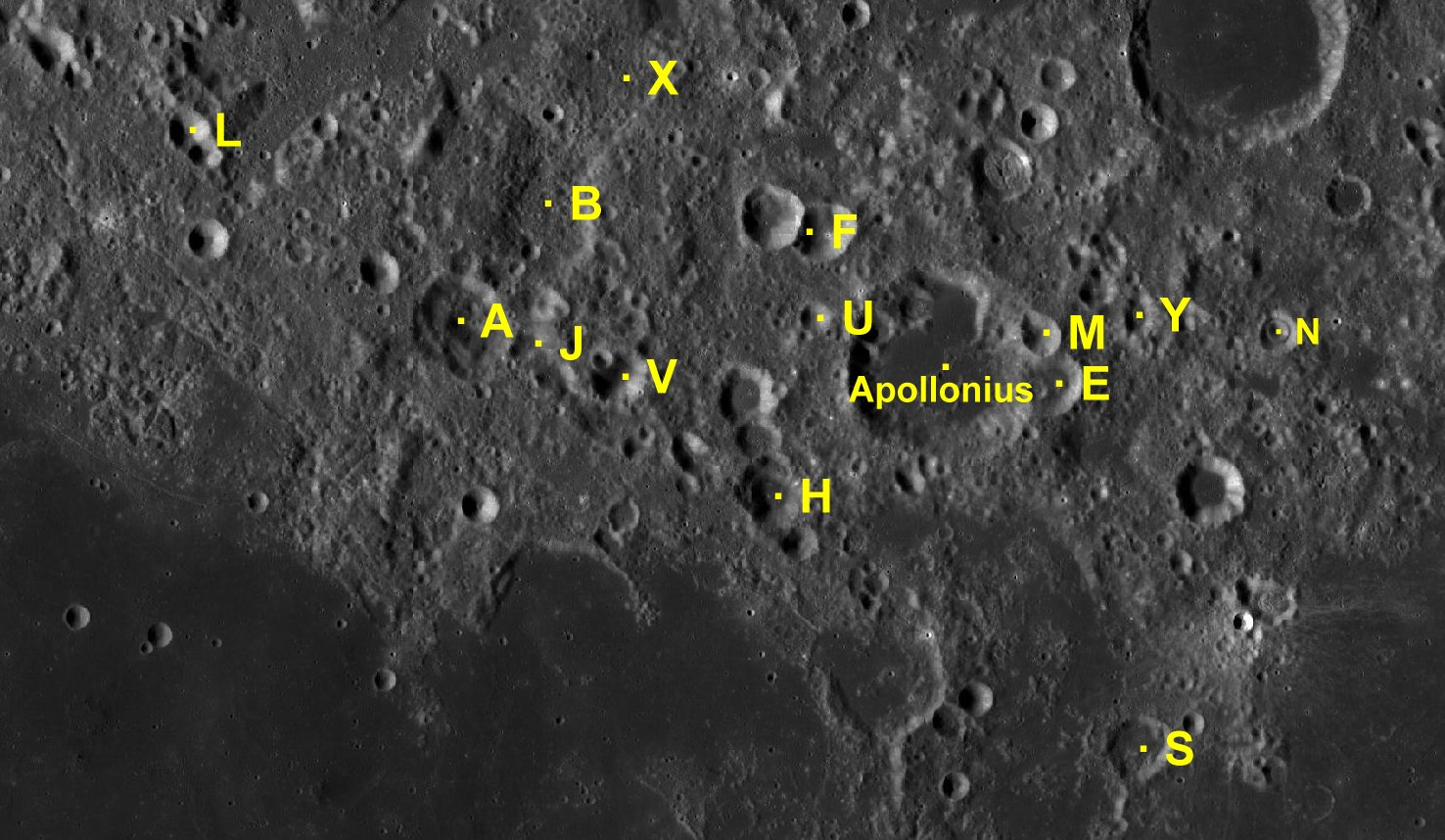
Satellite features of Apollonius

By convention these features are identified on lunar maps by placing the letter on the side of the crater midpoint that is closest to Apollonius.

Apollonius	Latitude	Longitude	Diameter
A	4.8° N	56.8° E	24 km
B	5.7° N	57.6° E	32 km
E	4.4° N	61.9° E	16 km
F	5.6° N	60.0° E	16 km
H	3.4° N	59.6° E	20 km
J	4.6° N	57.5° E	12 km
L	6.5° N	54.6° E	9 km
M	4.8° N	61.9° E	10 km
N	4.8° N	64.1° E	9 km
S	1.1° N	62.6° E	15 km
U	4.9° N	59.9° E	7 km
V	4.4° N	58.2° E	16 km
X	7.0° N	58.1° E	31 km
Y	4.9° N	62.6° E	10 km

The following craters have been renamed by the IAU.

- Apollonius C — See Ameghino (crater).
- Apollonius D — See Cartan (crater).
- Apollonius G — See Townley (crater).
- Apollonius K — See Abbot (crater).
- Apollonius P — See Daly (lunar crater).
- Apollonius T — See Bombelli (crater).
- Apollonius W — See Petit (crater).

Apollonius N is a concentric (double-walled) crater. The landing site of Luna 20 was just to the west of what is now called Ameghino (crater).

== Gallery ==
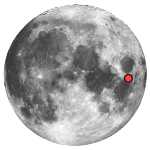
Location of Apollonius on the near side of the Moon

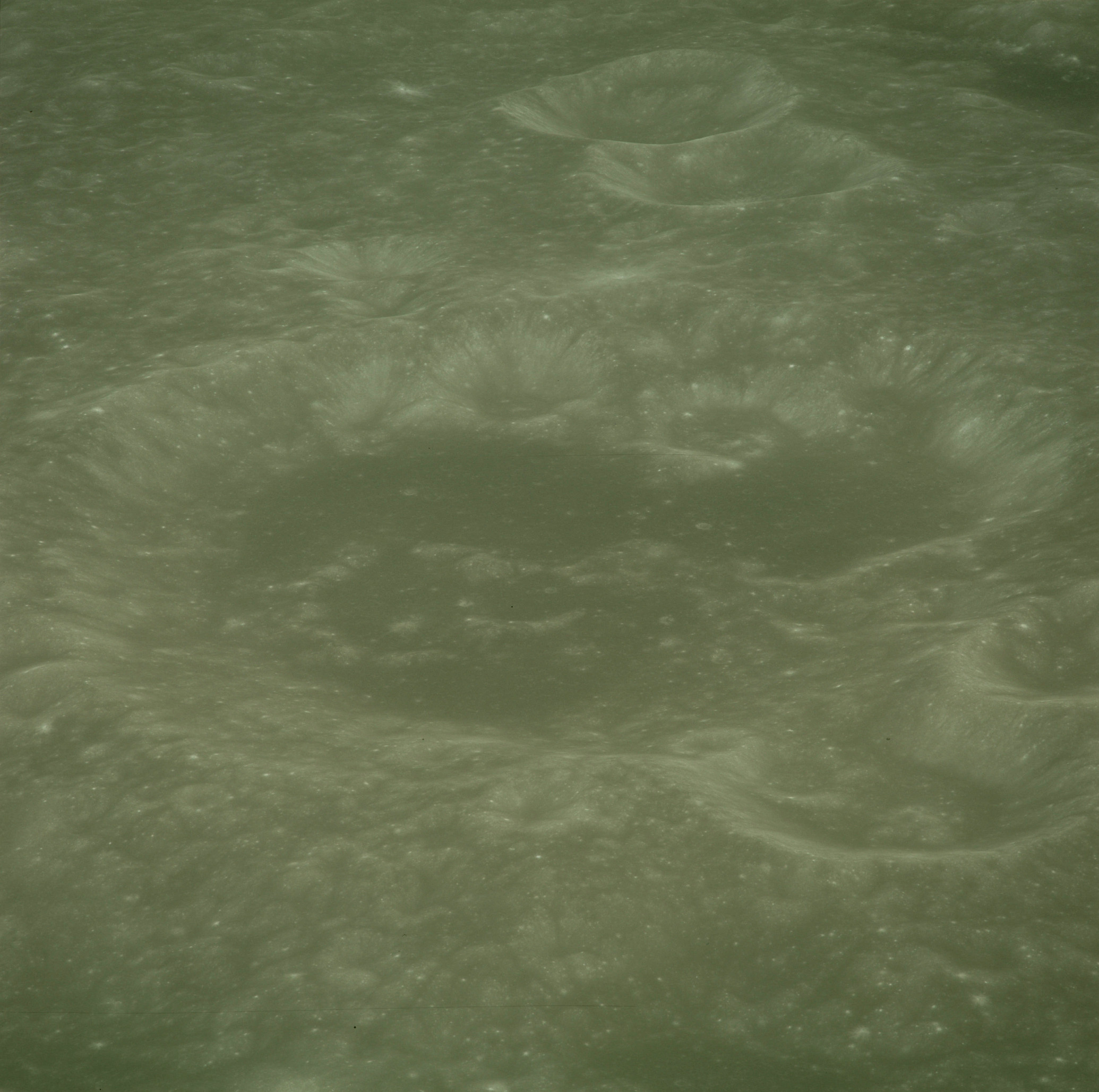
Oblique view from Apollo 10

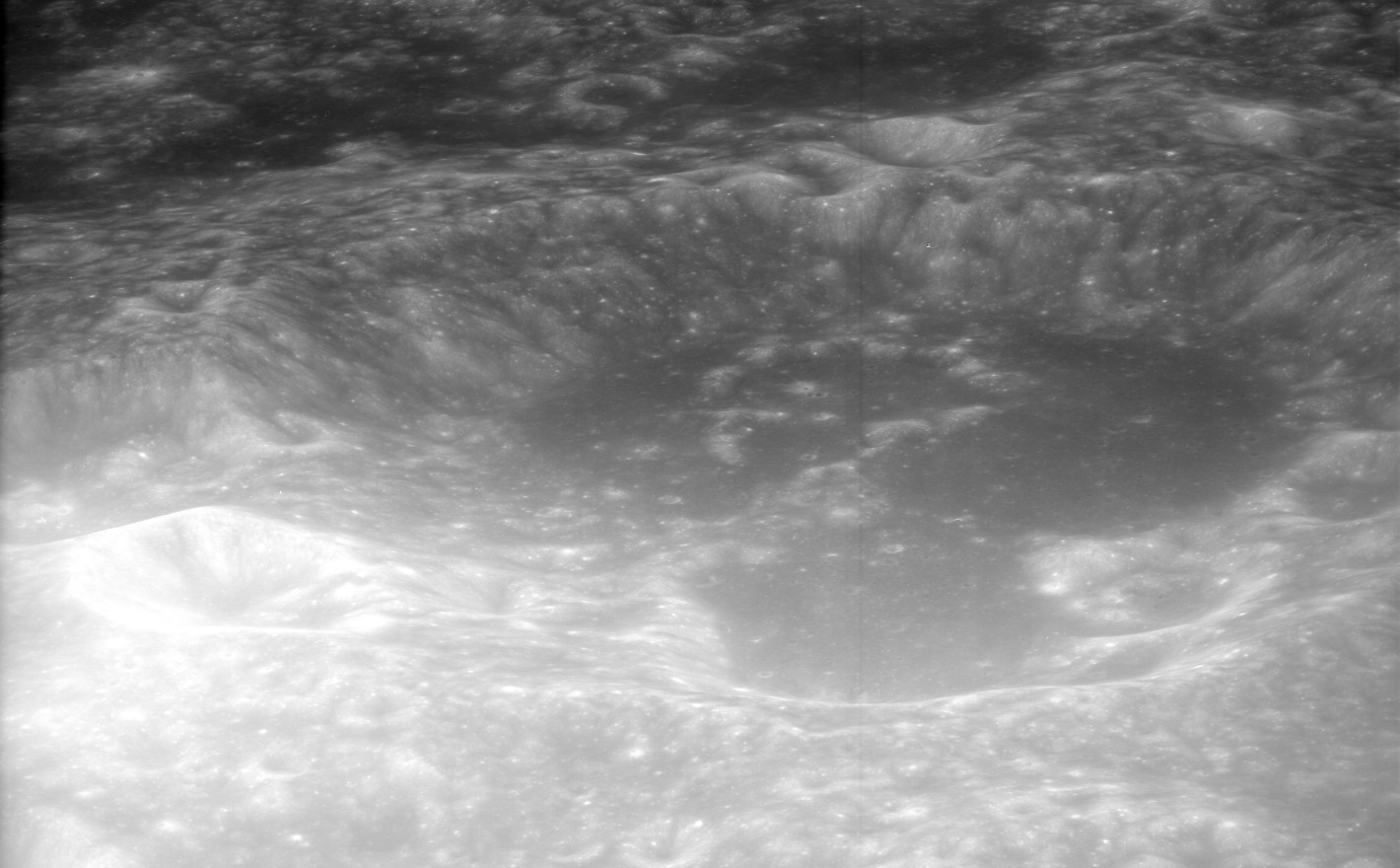
Oblique view from Apollo 17

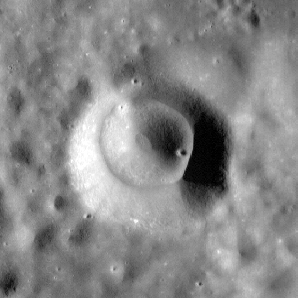
Apollonius N is a concentric crater

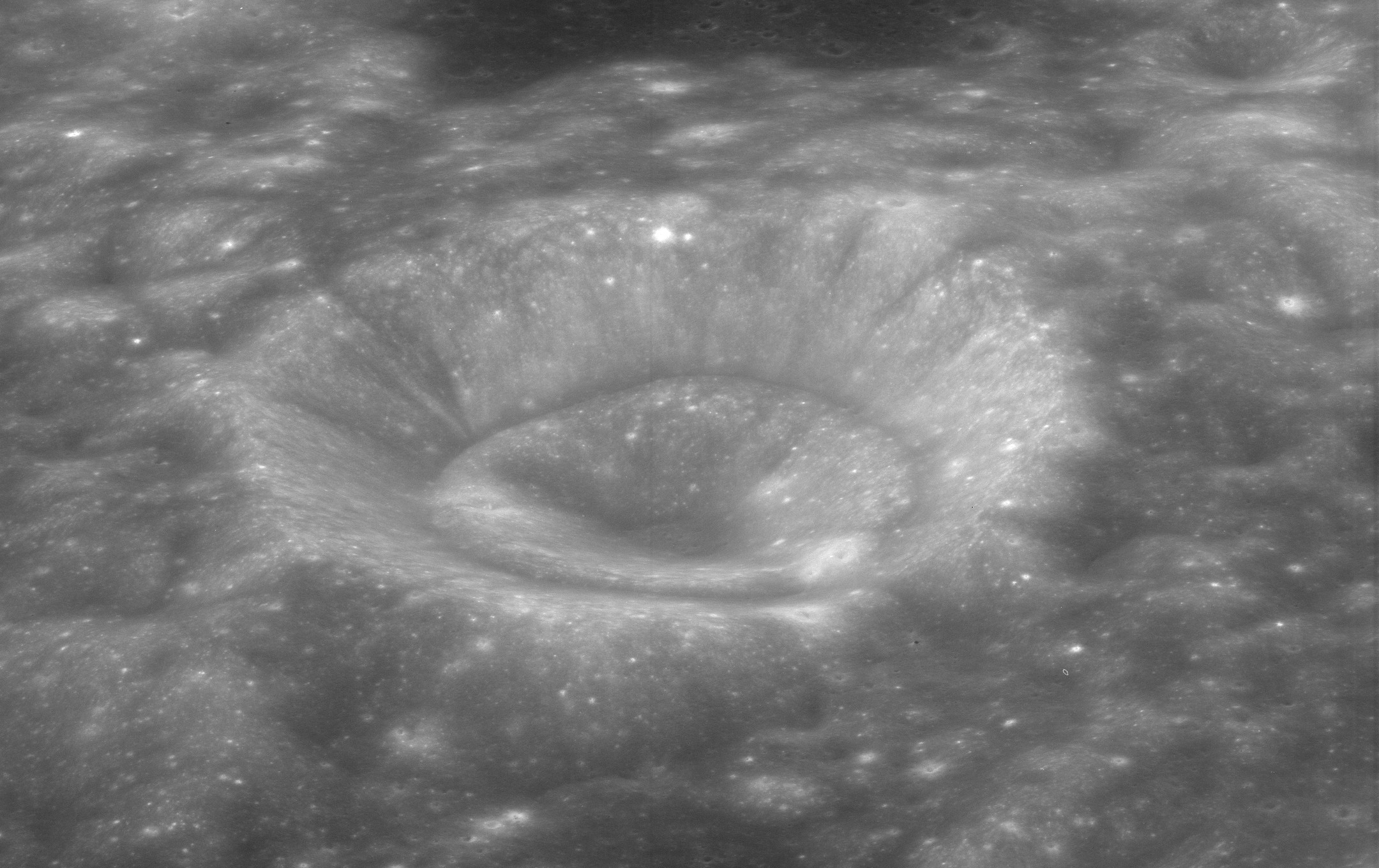
Oblique view of Apollonius N from Apollo 17

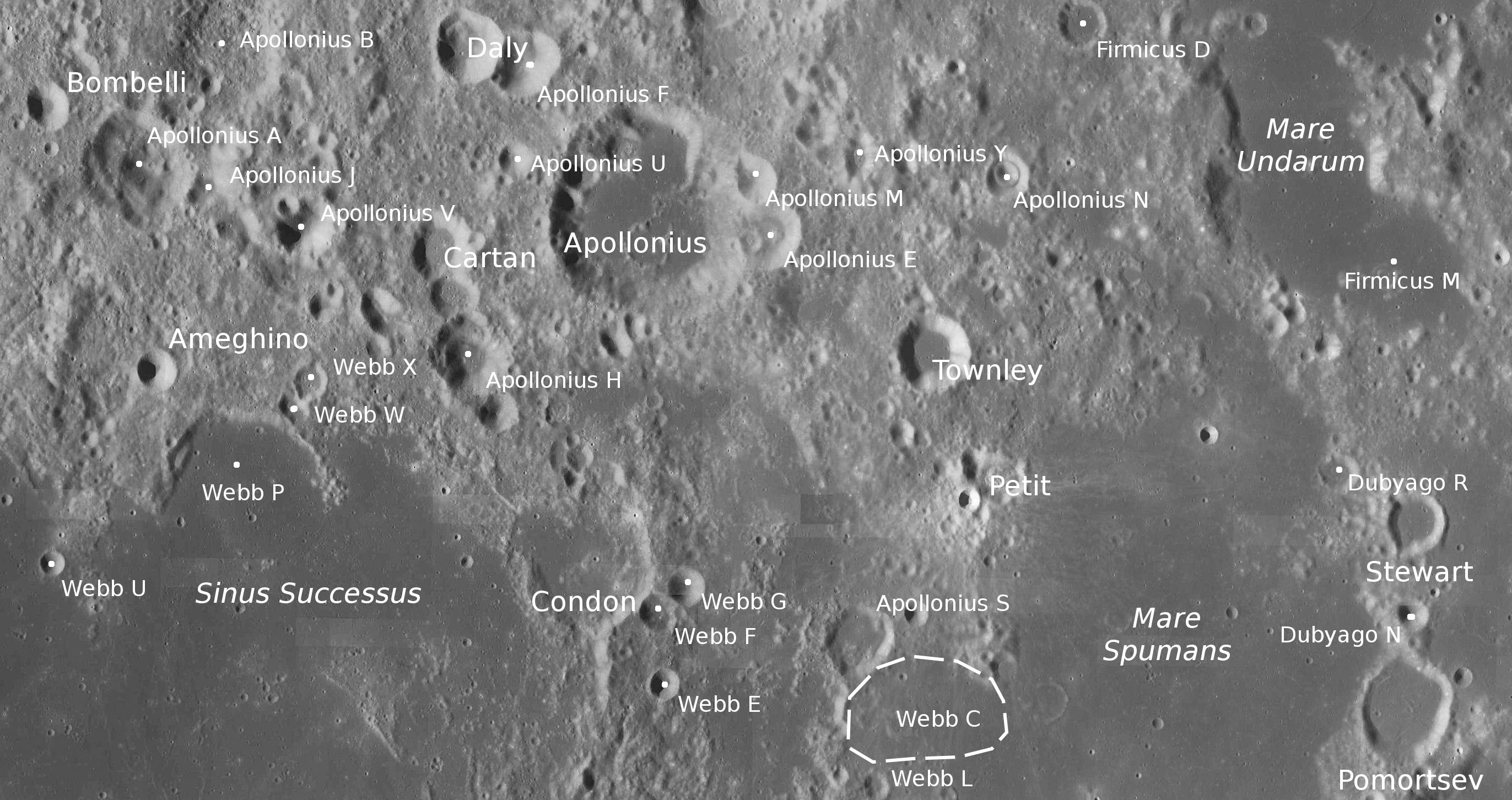
Apollonius and surroundings
