= Petit (crater) =

Crater on the Moon

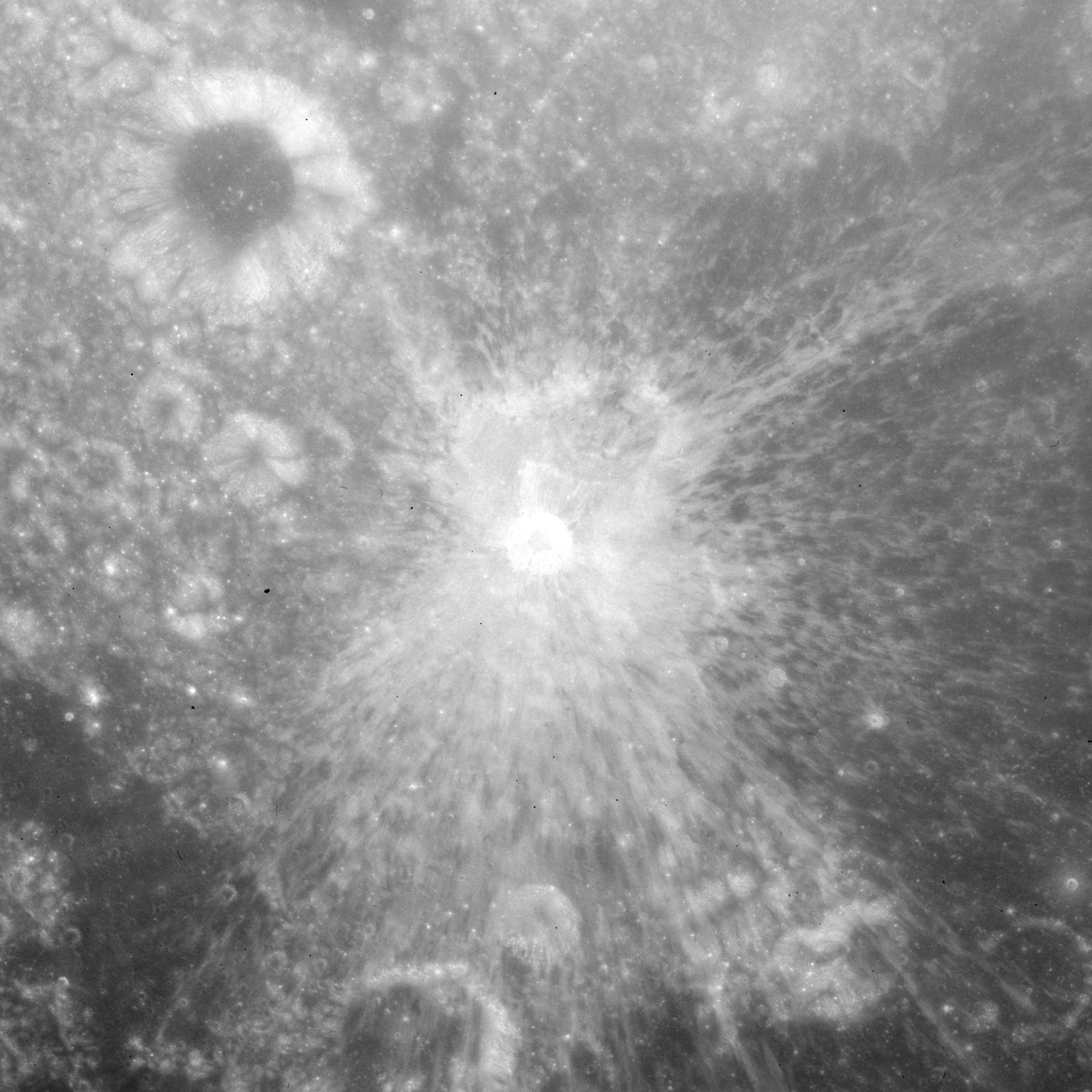
- Apollo 15 image
- Coordinates: 2.32°N 63.46°E
- Diameter: 5.04 km (3.13 mi)
- Depth: 1.0 km
- Colongitude: 297° at sunrise
- Eponym: Alexis T. Petit

Petit is a small, bowl-shaped lunar impact crater that is located on the northwestern edge of the Mare Spumans. The crater has a prominent ray system. The name is appropriate, since petite means small in French. But it was actually named in honor of Alexis Thérèse Petit, a French physicist.

The crater lies to the south of the crater Townley, and east of Condon. Farther to the northwest is Apollonius. Petit was previously designated Apollonius W before being given a name by the IAU in 1976.

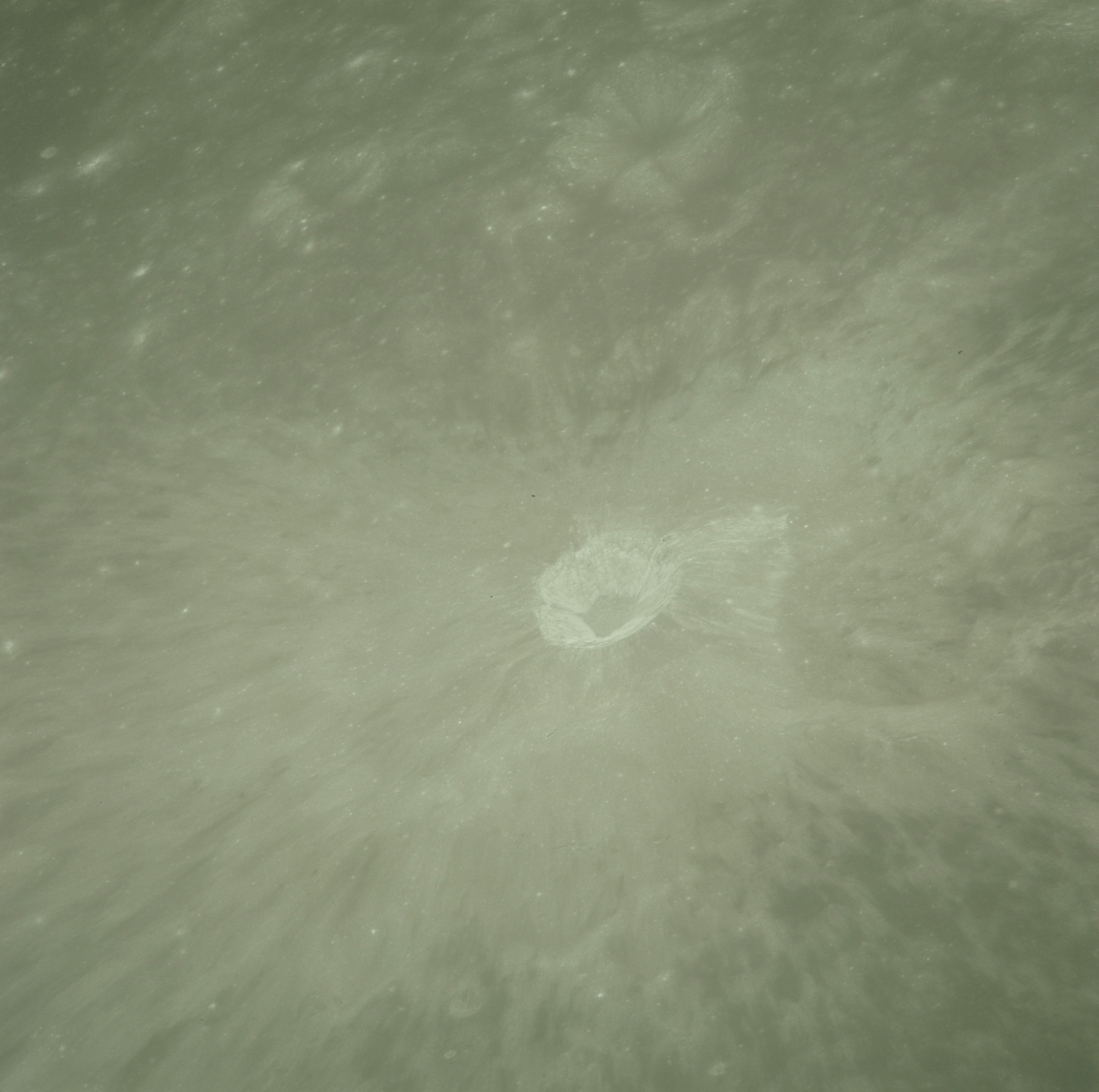
Oblique view from Apollo 10 (in color)

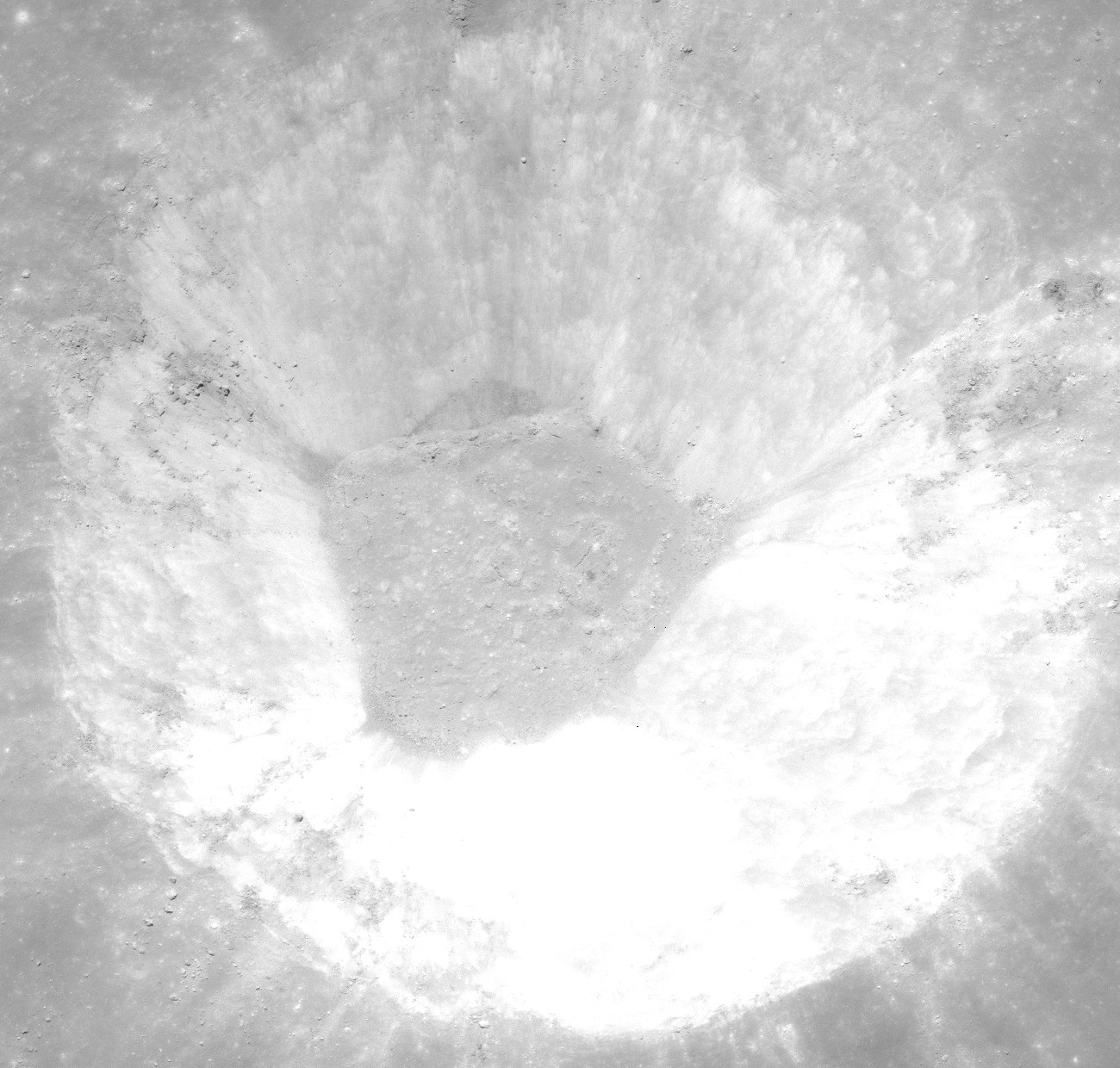
Interior of Petit, showing flat crater floor of impact melt with no visible craters, from Apollo 17

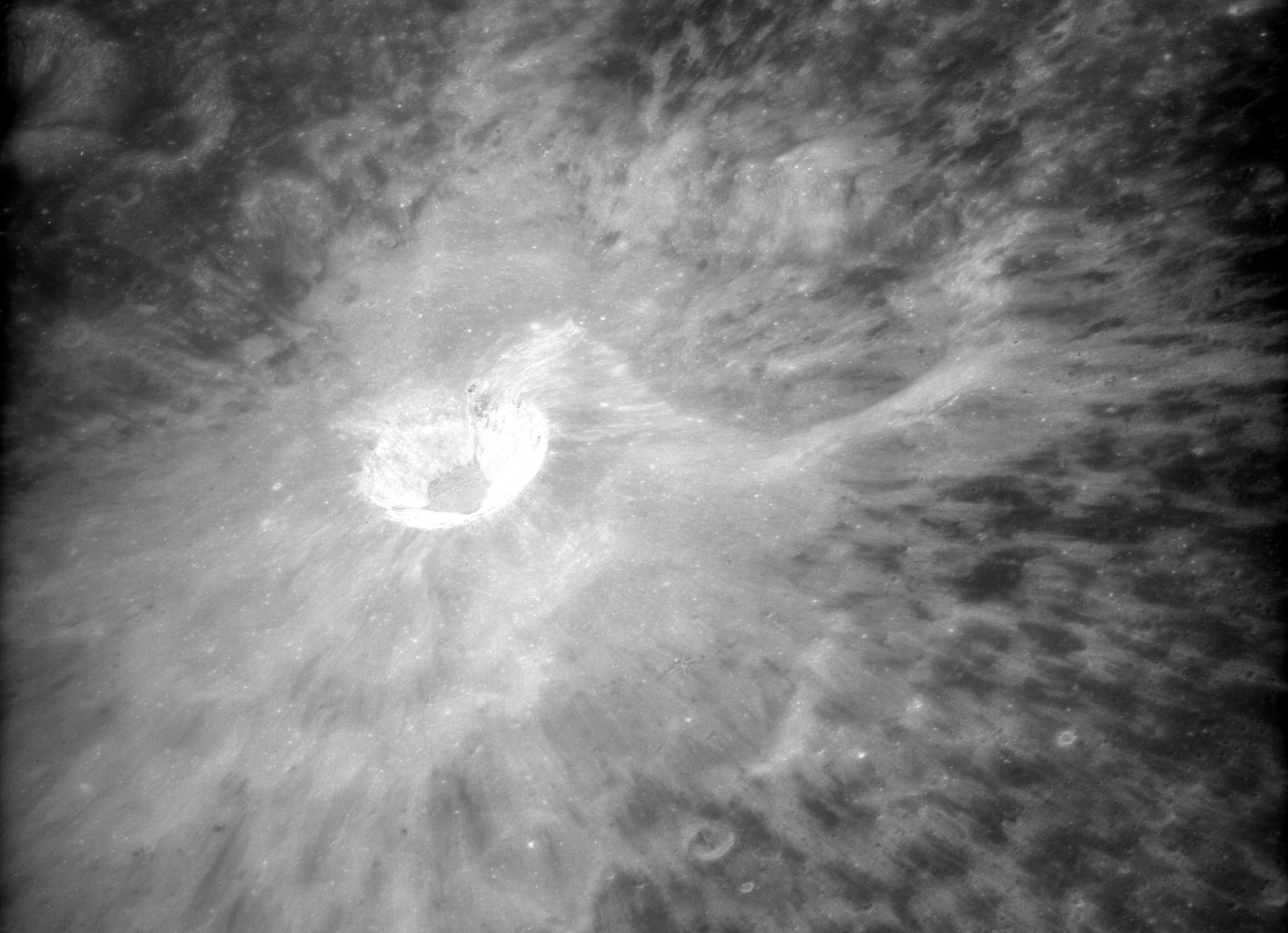
Oblique view from Apollo 16

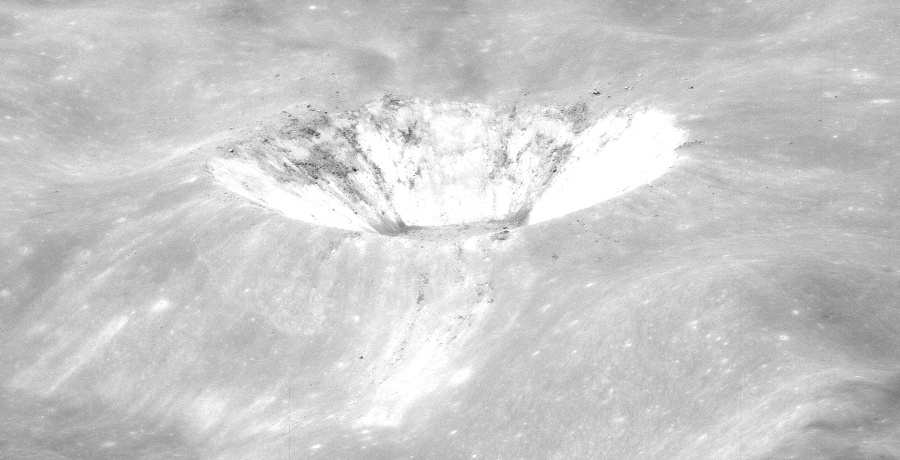
Oblique view from Apollo 17
