= Abbot (crater) =

Lunar impact crater

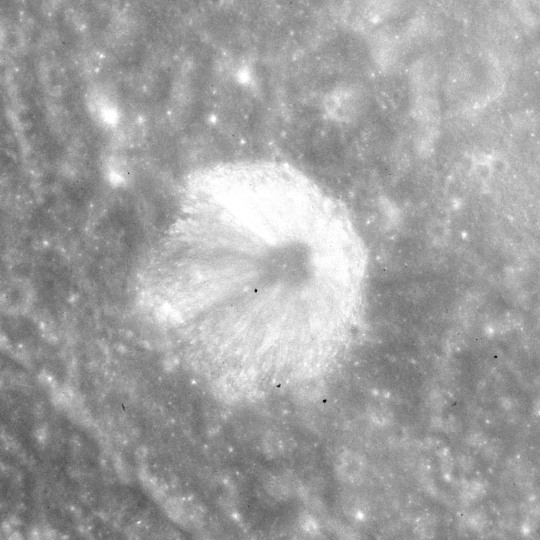
- Apollo 15 image
- Coordinates: 5.56°N 54.74°E
- Diameter: 10.4 km (6.5 mi)
- Depth: Unknown
- Colongitude: 306° at sunrise
- Eponym: Charles G. Abbot

Abbot is a small lunar impact crater that lies on the rugged ground between the Mare Fecunditatis in the south and west, and the Mare Crisium to the north. It is a circular crater with a cup-shaped interior. The inner walls slope downward to the midpoint, and no impacts of significance mark the interior or the rim.

Abbot is named after the American astrophysicist Charles Greeley Abbot (1872-1973). In a break with past tradition, Dr. Abbot was still alive at the time the decision was made. It was designated Apollonius K before being given its name by the IAU in 1973. Apollonius itself lies to the east of the crater Abbot.
