= Condon (crater) =

Lunar impact crater

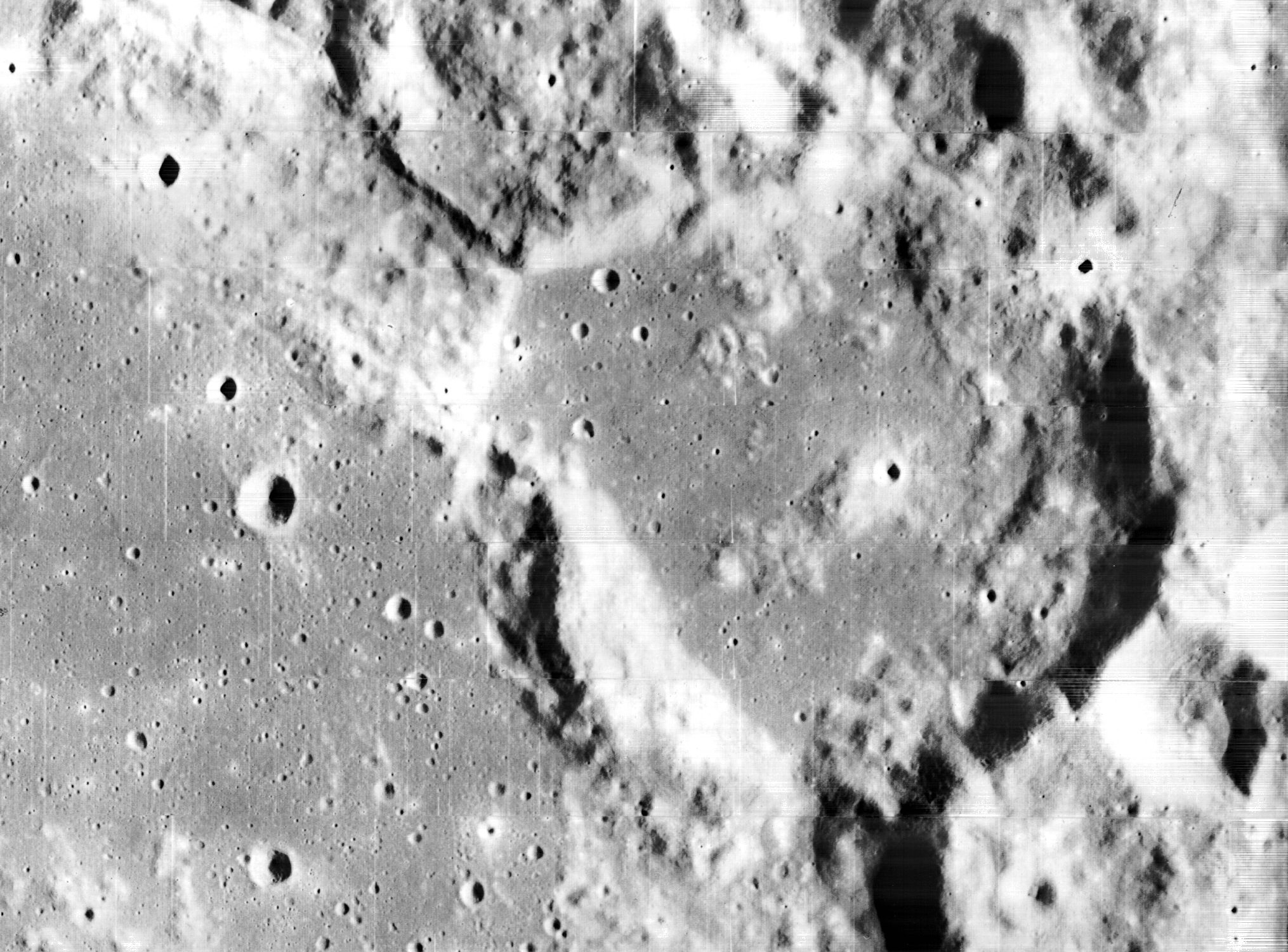
- The crater Condon from Lunar Orbiter 1. NASA/L&PI image.
- Coordinates: 1.87°N 60.36°E
- Diameter: 34.85 km (21.65 mi)
- Depth: 0.72 km (0.45 mi)
- Colongitude: 300° at sunrise
- Eponym: Edward U. Condon

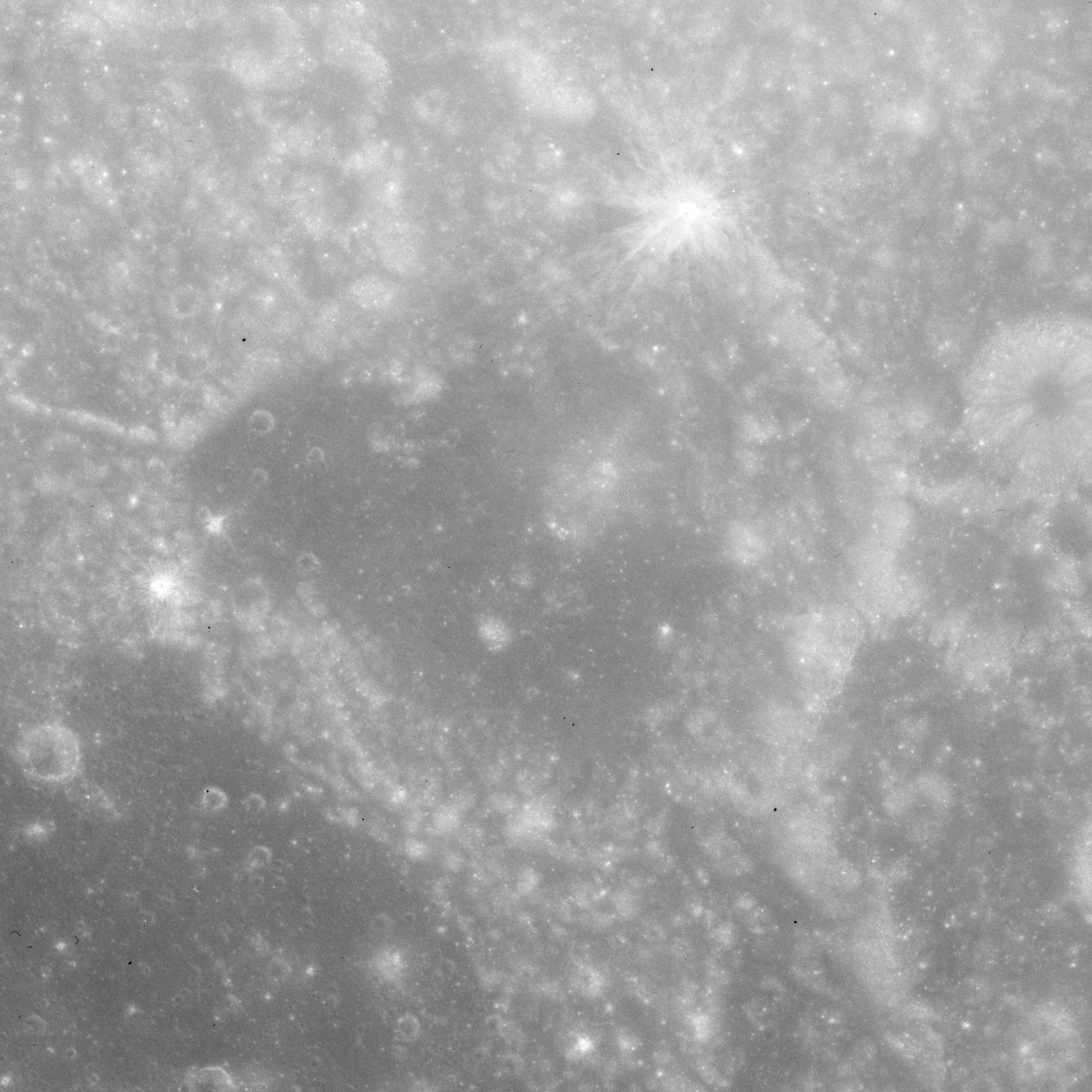
Apollo 15 image

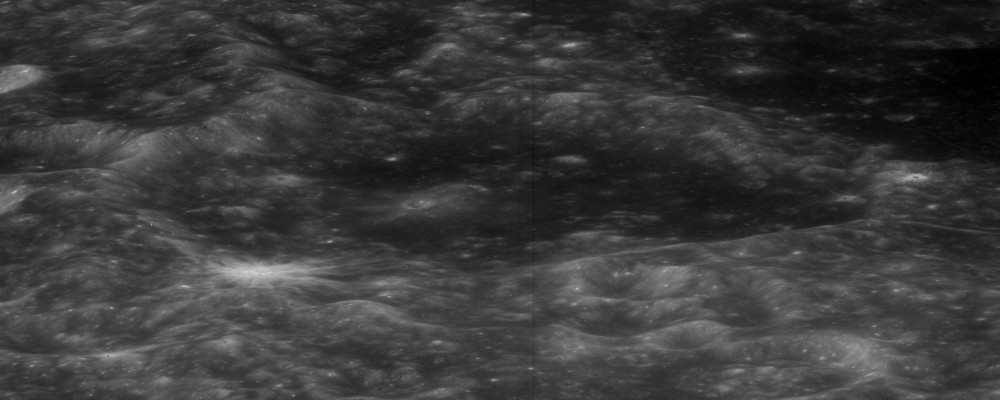
Oblique view from Apollo 17

Condon is a degraded lunar impact crater that lies on the eastern shore of the Sinus Successus, a bay along the northeast edge of Mare Fecunditatis. It lies midway between the larger crater Apollonius to the north and the smaller Webb to the south on the Mare Fecunditatis. Condon was previously designated Webb R.

This is a basalt-flooded crater remnant with only low rim segments surviving to the east and west. There is a break in the rim to the south and a wider break to the northwest of the crater. The crater interior is nearly level, and mark only by a few low rises in the surface.

This feature is named after American physicist Edward U. Condon (1902-1974). Its designation was officially adopted by the International Astronomical Union in 1976.
