= Webb (crater) =

Crater on the Moon

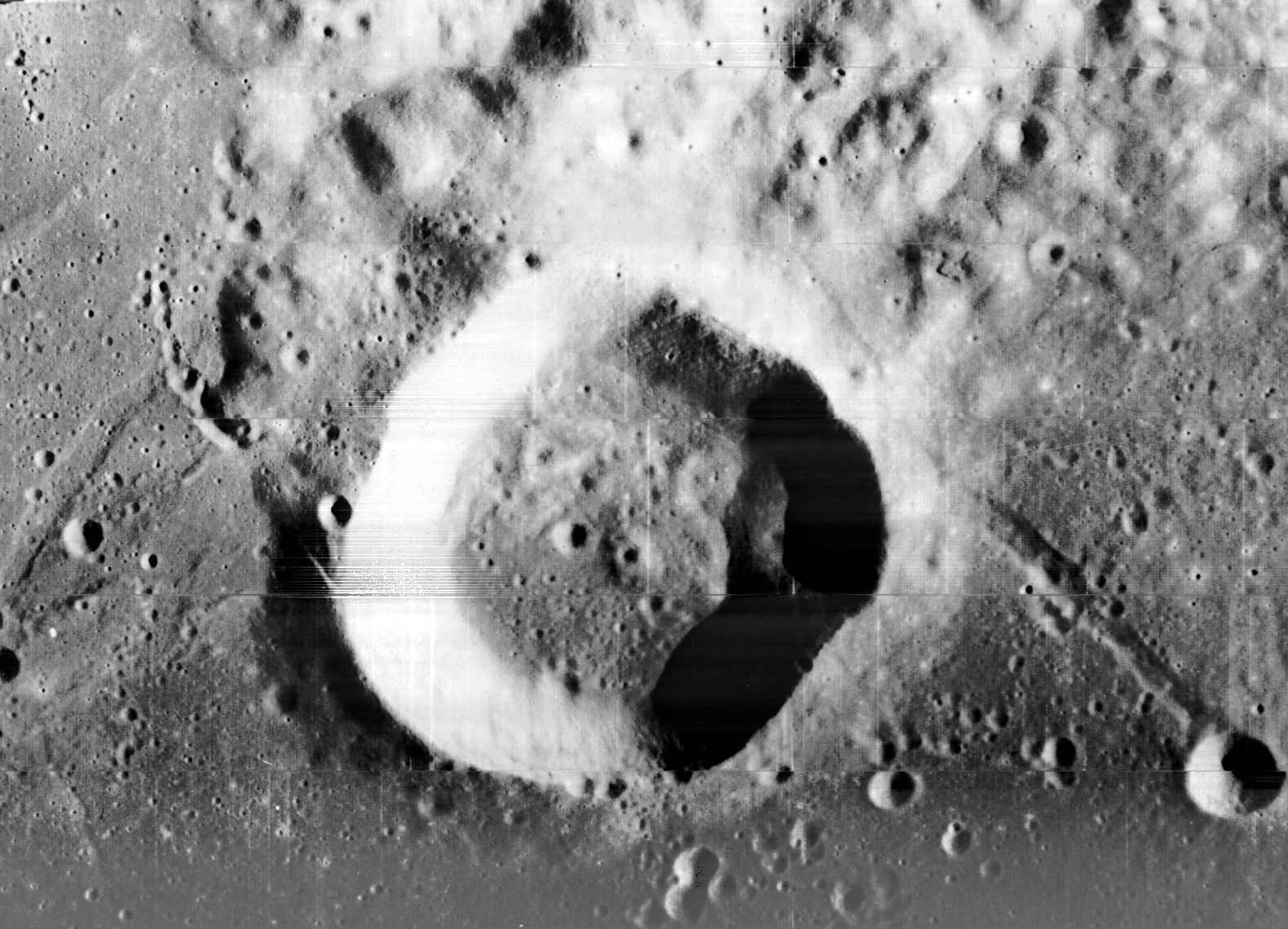
- Webb from Lunar Orbiter 1. NASA/L&PI image.
- Coordinates: 0.9°S 60.0°E
- Diameter: 21 km
- Depth: 1.85 km
- Colongitude: 300° at sunrise
- Eponym: Thomas W. Webb

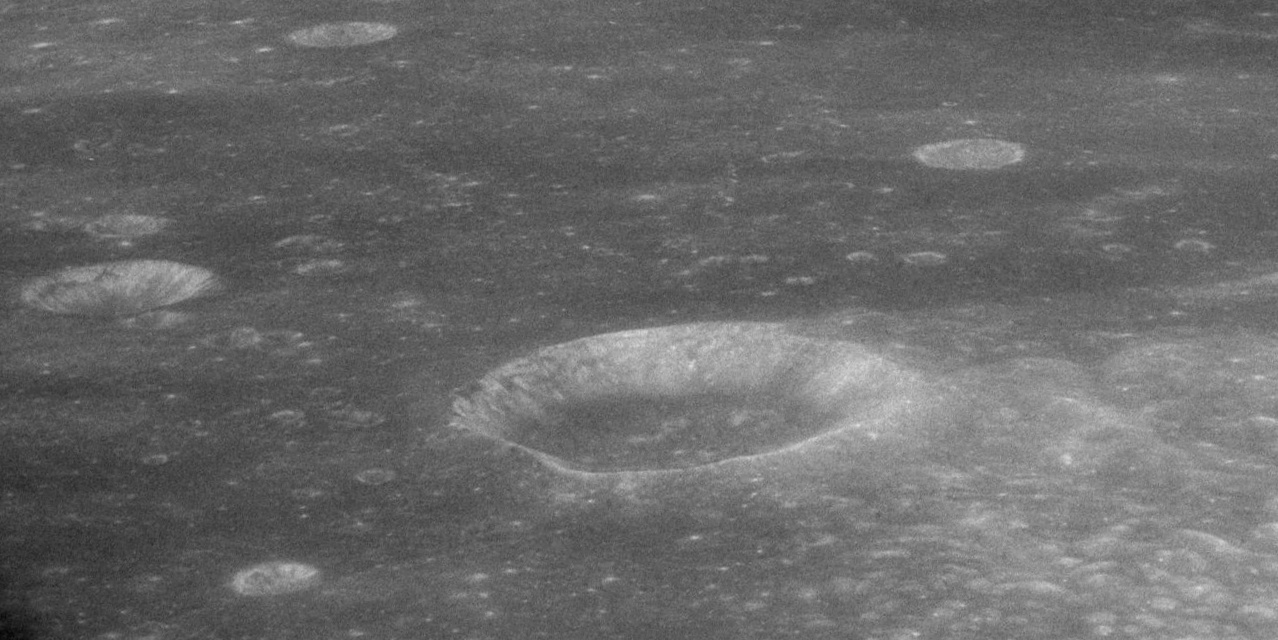
Oblique view facing west from Apollo 11, showing Webb at center, with Webb H at left, Webb D at top left, and Webb B above right of Webb itself.

Webb is a small lunar impact crater that is located near the eastern edge of the Mare Fecunditatis, in the eastern part of the Moon near the equator. It was named after British astronomer Thomas William Webb. It is to the north of the prominent crater Langrenus, and west of Maclaurin.

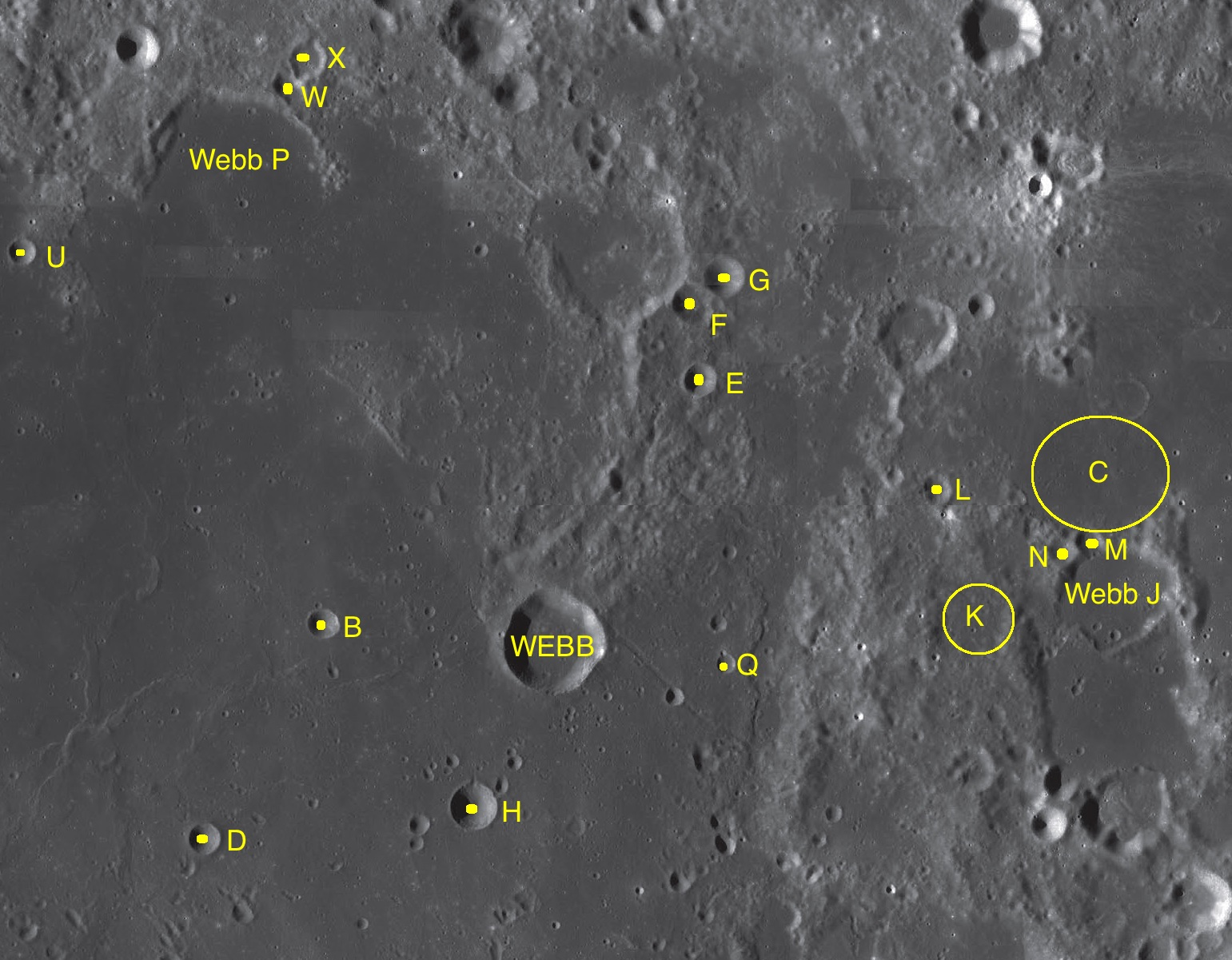
Satellite craters of Webb

The interior of Webb is relatively dark compared with the inner walls of the rim, and it has a low hill at the midpoint of the interior. On the lunar mare to the north is a faint marking of a ray system that appears to radiate from this crater. West of the crater is the wrinkle ridge Dorsa Andrusov.

== Satellite craters ==
By convention these features are identified on lunar maps by placing the letter on the side of the crater midpoint that is closest to Webb.

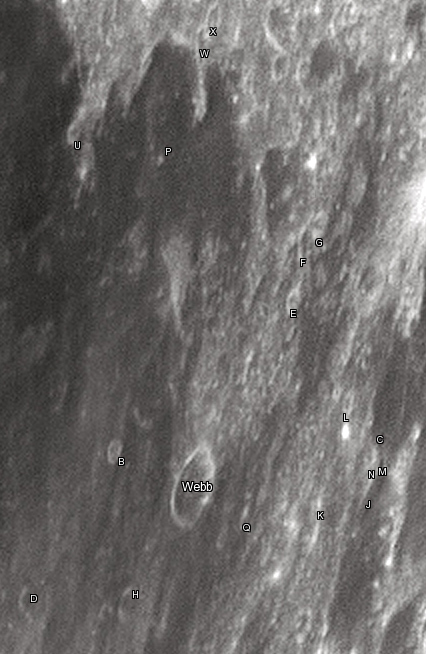
Webb and its satellite crater taken from Earth in 2012 at the University of Hertfordshire's Bayfordbury Observatory with the telescopes Meade LX200 14" and Lumenera Skynyx 2-1

Webb	Latitude	Longitude	Diameter
B	0.8° S	58.4° E	6 km
C	0.3° N	63.8° E	34 km
D	2.3° S	57.6° E	7 km
E	1.0° N	61.1° E	7 km
F	1.5° N	61.0° E	9 km
G	1.7° N	61.2° E	9 km
H	2.1° S	59.5° E	10 km
J	0.6° S	64.0° E	24 km
K	0.7° S	62.9° E	21 km
L	0.1° N	62.7° E	7 km
M	0.2° S	63.8° E	5 km
N	0.3° S	63.6° E	4 km
P	2.3° S	57.8° E	36 km
Q	1.0° S	61.2° E	5 km
U	1.8° N	56.3° E	6 km
W	3.0° N	58.2° E	8 km
X	3.2° N	58.3° E	8 km

The following crater has been renamed by the IAU.

- Webb R — See Condon (crater).

== See also ==
- Asteroid 3041 Webb
