= Daly (lunar crater) =

Crater on the Moon

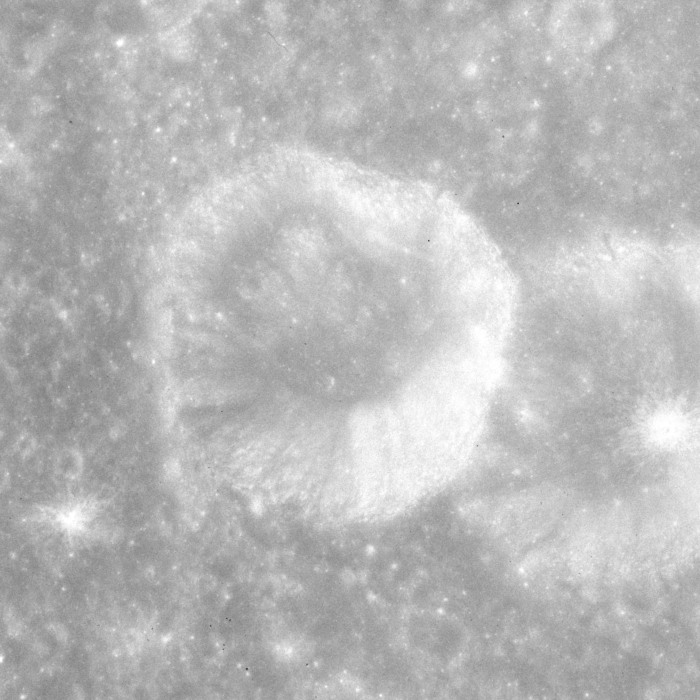
- Apollo 15 image
- Coordinates: 5.74°N 59.50°E
- Diameter: 14.96 km (9.30 mi)
- Depth: 1.7 km
- Colongitude: 301° at sunrise
- Eponym: Reginald A. Daly

Daly is a small lunar impact crater that is located in the eastern part of the Moon, to the northwest of the crater Apollonius. This formation is relatively circular, with a slight inward bulge along the northern rim. The inner wall is wider in the southern half than in the north. The crater intrudes into the comparably sized crater Apollonius F to the east-southeast.

The crater is named after Canadian-born American geologist Reginald Aldworth Daly (1871-1957). Its designation was formally adopted by the International Astronomical Union in 1973. Previously, it was identified as Apollonius P, a satellite feature of the crater Apollonius.
