= Edward Condon =

American nuclear physicist (1902–1974)

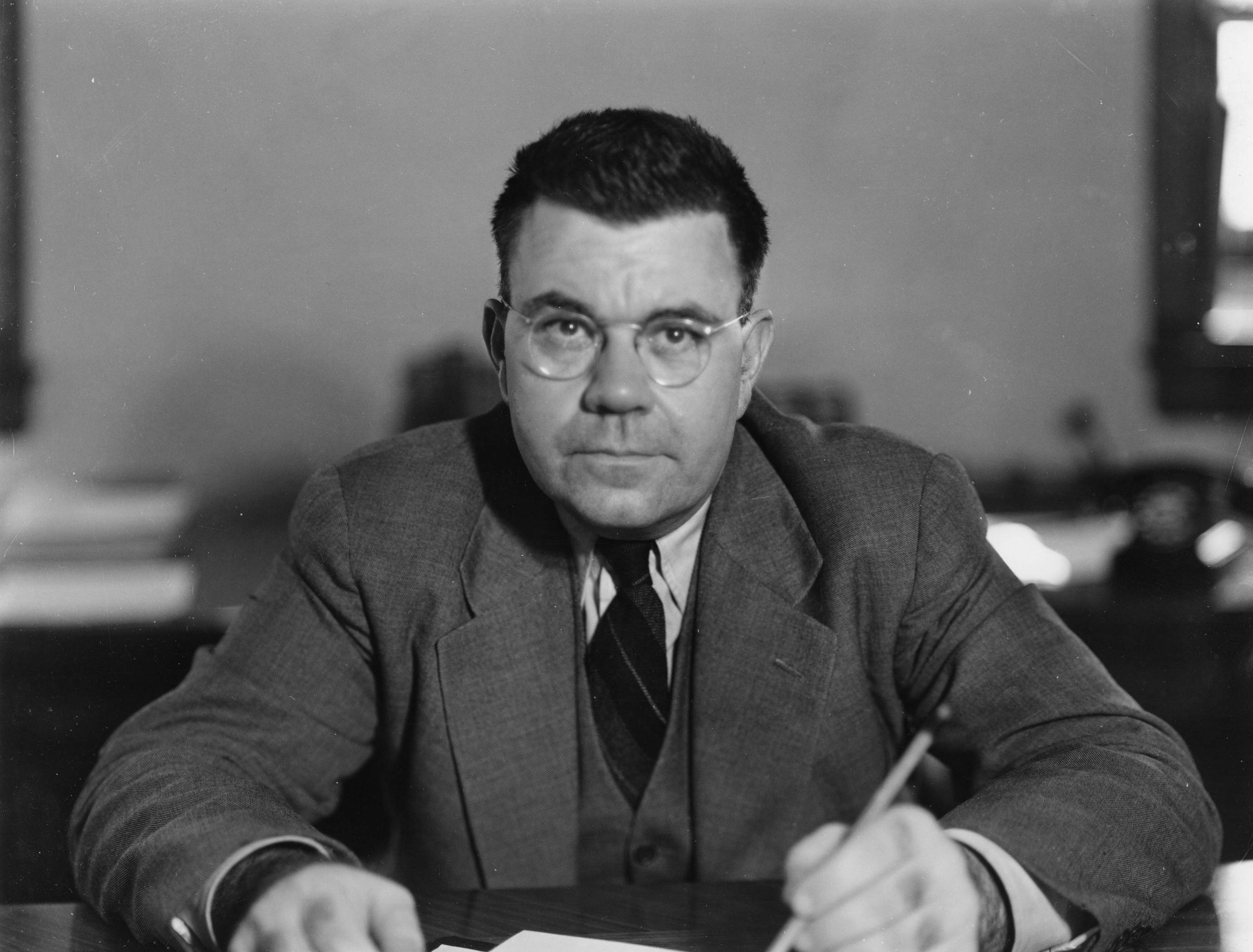
- Edward Condon at NIST (c. 1945-1951)

4th Director of National Bureau of Standards
- In office 1945–1951
- President: Harry S. Truman
- Preceded by: Lyman James Briggs
- Succeeded by: Allen V. Astin

Personal details
- Born: March 2, 1902 Alamogordo, New Mexico Territory, U.S.
- Died: March 26, 1974 (aged 72) Boulder, Colorado, U.S.
- Education: University of California, Berkeley (BS, MS, PhD)
- Scientific career
- Known for: Condon–Shortley phase Franck–Condon principle Slater–Condon rules Nimatron; Quantum tunneling theory of alpha decay Radar and nuclear weapons research Condon model Target of McCarthyism
- Fields: Physics
- Workplaces: Columbia University; Princeton University; Westinghouse Electric Company; National Bureau of Standards; Washington University in St. Louis; University of Colorado Boulder
- Thesis: On the theory of intensity distribution in band systems (1927)
- Doctoral advisor: Raymond Thayer Birge
- Doctoral students: Edwin McMillan
- Other notable students: Walter Kauzmann (postdoc); James Stark Koehler (postdoc); Richard Zare (postdoc)

Edward Uhler Condon (March 2, 1902 – March 26, 1974) was an American nuclear physicist, a pioneer in quantum mechanics, and a participant during World War II in the development of radar and, very briefly, of nuclear weapons as part of the Manhattan Project. The Franck–Condon principle and the Slater–Condon rules are co-named after him.

He was the fourth director of the National Bureau of Standards (NIST) from 1945 to 1951. In 1946, Condon was president of the American Physical Society, and in 1953 was president of the American Association for the Advancement of Science.

During the McCarthy period, Condon was one of the first prominent scientists to become a target of the House Un-American Activities Committee, charged publicly in 1948 with being "one of the weakest links in our atomic security" on account of his extensive knowledge of classified information, his connections with the development of the atomic bomb, and his alleged sympathies for communism and the Soviet Union. His case became a cause célèbre among those who opposed McCarthyism, especially scientists, and was one of the most prominent cases of its time, and he was defended by many prominent scientists, as well as President Harry Truman.

Condon became widely known in 1968 as principal author of the Condon Report, an official review funded by the United States Air Force that concluded that unidentified flying objects (UFOs) have prosaic explanations. The lunar crater Condon is named for him.

== Background ==
Figure 1. Franck–Condon principle energy diagram. Since electronic transitions are very fast compared with nuclear motions, vibrational levels are favored when they correspond to a minimal change in the nuclear coordinates. The potential wells are shown favoring transitions between v = 0 and v = 2

Edward Uhler Condon was born on March 2, 1902, in Alamogordo, New Mexico, to William Edward Condon and Carolyn Uhler. His father was supervising the construction of a narrow-gauge railroad, many of which were built in the area by logging companies. After graduating from high school in Oakland, California in 1918, he worked as a journalist for three years at the Oakland Inquirer and other papers. He was of Irish descent.

He then attended the University of California, Berkeley, initially joining the College of Chemistry; when he learned that his high school physics teacher had joined the faculty, he switched majors to take classes in theoretical physics. Condon earned his bachelor's degree in three years and his doctorate in two. His Ph.D. thesis combined work by Raymond Thayer Birge on measuring and analyzing band spectral intensities and a suggestion by James Franck.

Thanks to a National Research Council fellowship, Condon studied at Göttingen under Max Born and at Munich under Arnold Sommerfeld. Under the latter, Condon rewrote his Ph.D. thesis using quantum mechanics, creating the Franck–Condon principle. After seeing an ad in Physical Review, Condon worked in public relations at Bell Telephone Laboratories in fall 1927, in particular promoting their discovery of electron diffraction. While working at Bell Telephone Laboratories he also analyzed the frequency of word usage and related the results to the Weber–Fechner law in psychology.

== Career ==
=== Early career ===
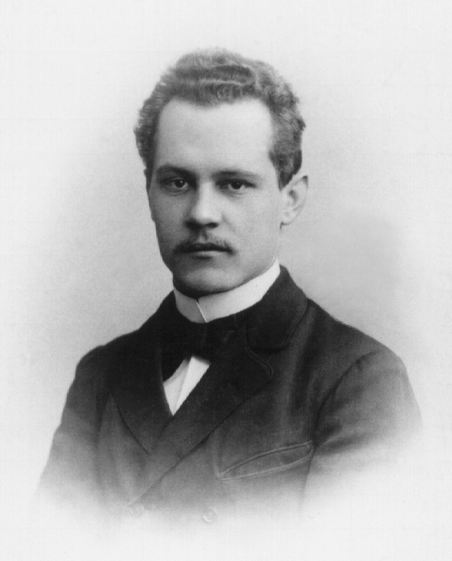
Arnold Sommerfeld, German theoretical physicist taught Condon during the 1920s

Condon taught briefly at Columbia University and was associate professor of physics at Princeton University from 1928 to 1937, except for a year at the University of Minnesota. With Philip M. Morse, he wrote Quantum Mechanics, the first English-language text on the subject in 1929. With G.H. Shortley, he wrote the Theory of Atomic Spectra, "a bible on the subject from the moment of its 1935 publication". (Note: Some sources date The Theory of Atomic Spectra to 1936, but facsimile editions establish 1935 as the correct copyright date, along with Wheeler.)

He was associate director of research at the Westinghouse Electric Company in Pittsburgh, beginning in 1937, where he established research programs in nuclear physics, solid-state physics, and mass spectrometry. He then headed the company's research on microwave radar development. He also worked on the equipment used to isolate uranium for use in atomic bombs. He served as a consultant to the National Defense Research Committee during World War II and helped organize MIT's Radiation Laboratory. On May 11, 1940, Condon showcased the "Nimatron", an electro-mechanical machine for playing Nim, at the 1940 New York World Fair.

=== Government service ===
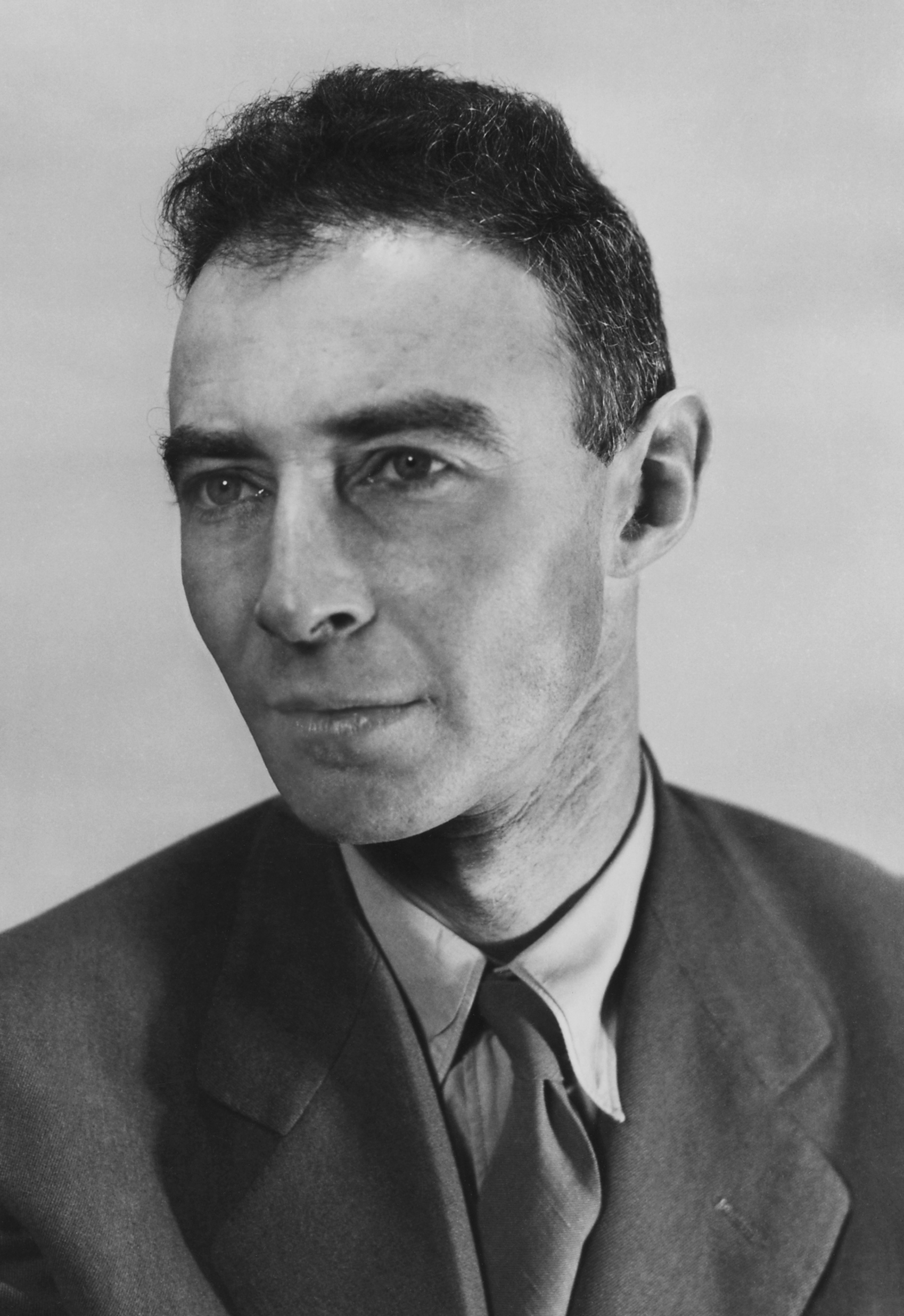
J. Robert Oppenheimer (circa 1944) led the Manhattan Project, on which Condon briefly served in the early 1940s during WWII

In 1943, Condon joined the Manhattan Project. Within six weeks, he resigned as a result of conflicts about security with General Leslie R. Groves, the project's military leader. General Groves had objected when Condon's superior J. Robert Oppenheimer held a discussion with the director of the project's Metallurgical Lab (Arthur Compton) at the University of Chicago. In his resignation letter, he said he felt he would be more useful to the war effort by staying at Westinghouse, explaining that the security measures he found at Los Alamos so concerned him that he would become depressed and ineffective. Condon was upset that Oppenheimer did not stand up to Groves, but he did not know that Oppenheimer had yet to receive his own security clearance.

From August 1943 to February 1945, Condon worked as a part-time consultant at Berkeley on the separation of U-235 and U-238. Condon was elected to the National Academy of Sciences in 1944. In June 1945, Condon was among many prominent American scientists invited to attend a celebration of the 220th anniversary of the founding of the Russian Academy of Sciences to be held in Moscow. He indicated his desire to attend. When Groves learned of this, he contacted Condon's employers at Westinghouse, and explained that he believed this would be dangerous from the perspective of possibly revealing information about the atomic bomb work that was still on-going. Condon attempted to contact the White House in protest. Subsequently, Groves requested that the State Department revoke Condon's passport, which they did.

Following the war, Condon played a leading role in organizing scientists to lobby for civilian control of atomic energy rather than military control under strict security. He worked as science adviser to Senator Brien McMahon, chairman of the Senate Special Committee on Atomic Energy, which wrote the McMahon-Douglas Act, enacted in August 1946, that created the Atomic Energy Commission, placing atomic energy under civilian control. Adopting an internationalist viewpoint, Condon favored international scientific cooperation and joined the American-Soviet Science Society. Condon was elected to the American Academy of Arts and Sciences in 1947.

U.S. Commerce Secretary (and former U.S. vice president) Henry A. Wallace came to know Condon and in October 1945 recommended him as director of the National Bureau of Standards (NBS, now known as NIST). President Harry S. Truman agreed to nominate him. The Senate confirmed his nomination without opposition. Condon served as NBS director until 1951. He was also president of the American Physical Society in 1946. Condon was also either a member or associated with the Independent Citizens Committee of the Arts, Sciences and Professions (ICCASP). He was elected to the American Philosophical Society in 1949.

=== Attacks ===
==== 1940s ====
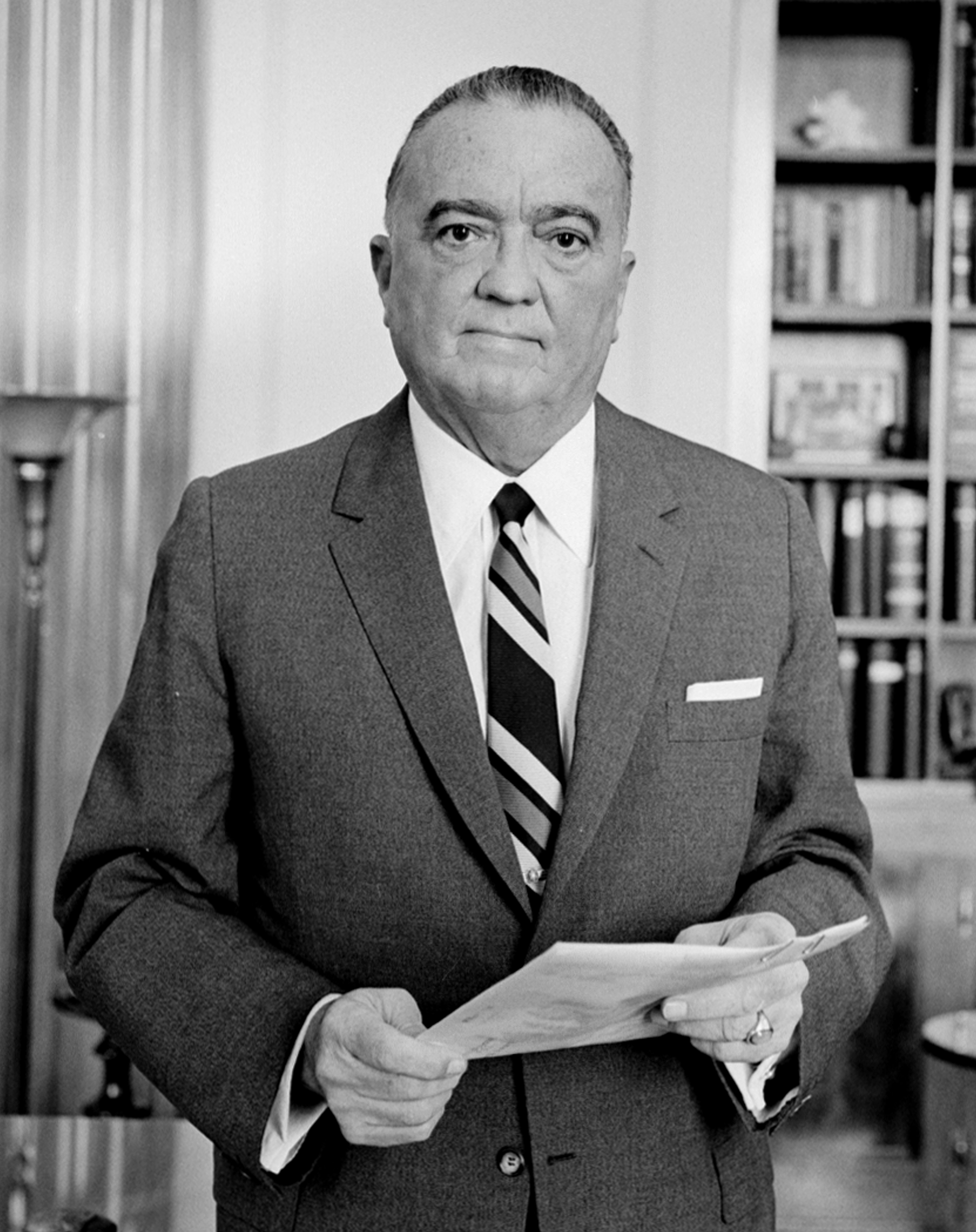
J. Edgar Hoover claimed Condon took part in a "Soviet network" in a 1946 letter

During the 1940s, Condon's security clearance status was repeatedly questioned, reviewed, and re-established.

On May 29, 1946, FBI Director J. Edgar Hoover wrote a letter intended for President Truman that named several senior government officials as part of a Soviet network. It described Condon as "nothing more or less than an espionage agent in disguise". (Decades later Senator Daniel Patrick Moynihan called it "baseless corridor talk".) The Truman administration ignored Hoover's charges.

On March 21, 1947, Truman signed United States Executive Order 9835 AKA the "Loyalty Order". In the same month, Congressman J. Parnell Thomas, head of the House Un-American Activities Committee (HUAC), furnished information to the Washington Times-Herald that denigrated his loyalty in two articles published. Thomas had several reasons to make a prominent case of Condon. He had no sympathy for the scientific community's international spirit in the first place and could use the ongoing controversy to argue for an increase in his committee's appropriation, to bolster opposition to the Condon-supported McMahon Act, and to attract favorable coverage during election season. The Department of Commerce cleared Condon of disloyalty charges on February 24, 1948.

J. Parnell Thomas (1939) attacked Condon's reputation in 1947 and 1948

Nevertheless, a HUAC report dated March 2, 1948 stated, "It appears that Dr. Condon is one of the weakest links in our atomic security." Condon responded: "If it is true that I am one of the weakest links in atomic security that is very gratifying and the country can feel absolutely safe for I am completely reliable, loyal, conscientious and devoted to the interests of my country, as my whole life and career clearly reveal." On March 3, 1948, Senator Dennis Chávez (Dem-NM) read into the Congressional Record an article by Marquis Childs, which suggested that the committee actions against Condon were based on flimsy evidence and may have been motivated by political differences with Henry Wallace, the former Secretary of Commerce who appointed Condon to head the Bureau of Standards.

On March 5, 1948, Representative George MacKinnon (Rep-MN) stated: "Mr. Speaker, today's paper carries the story that the Secretary of Commerce, Mr. [W. Averell] Harriman, has refused to respond to a congressional subpoena to supply information with respect to one Dr. Condon. I am not presuming to pass on the facts in that case, but I do wish to point out that this follows the same pattern of Secrecy as the administration has been following with respect to congressional subpoenas throughout this entire session." On March 6, 1948, a Washington Post editorial stated, "There is an abundance of precedent for the Secretary's refusal to turn over his department's loyalty board files on Dr. Edward U. Condon." The Post also objected to an alternative proposal to send files on the Condon case to the top-level "Loyalty Review Board" in the Civil Service Commission. The Commerce Department's own loyalty board had already cleared Condon, and the Post argued that this decision should stand. On March 8, 1948, Representative Chester E. Holifield (Dem-CA) noted: "... calling the attention of the Members to H. R. 4641, a bill which I introduced December 4, 1947. The purpose of this bill is to prescribe the procedures of investigating committees of the Congress and to protect the rights of parties under investigation by such committees. If this bill could be enacted, it would extend to a world-famous scientist, such as Dr. E. U. Condon, the same protection which is now available to a chicken thief or a traffic violator; that is, the right of defense against his accusers. Character assassination under the cloak of congressional immunity by a Member of Congress or a Congressional committee is a dangerous and abominable travesty." On March 9, 1948, Representative Glen H. Taylor (Dem-ID), then Progressive Party vice presidential candidate, Representative Emanuel Celler (Dem-NY), Representative Leo Isacson (ALP-NY) all condemn the recurring attacks on Condon by the committee.

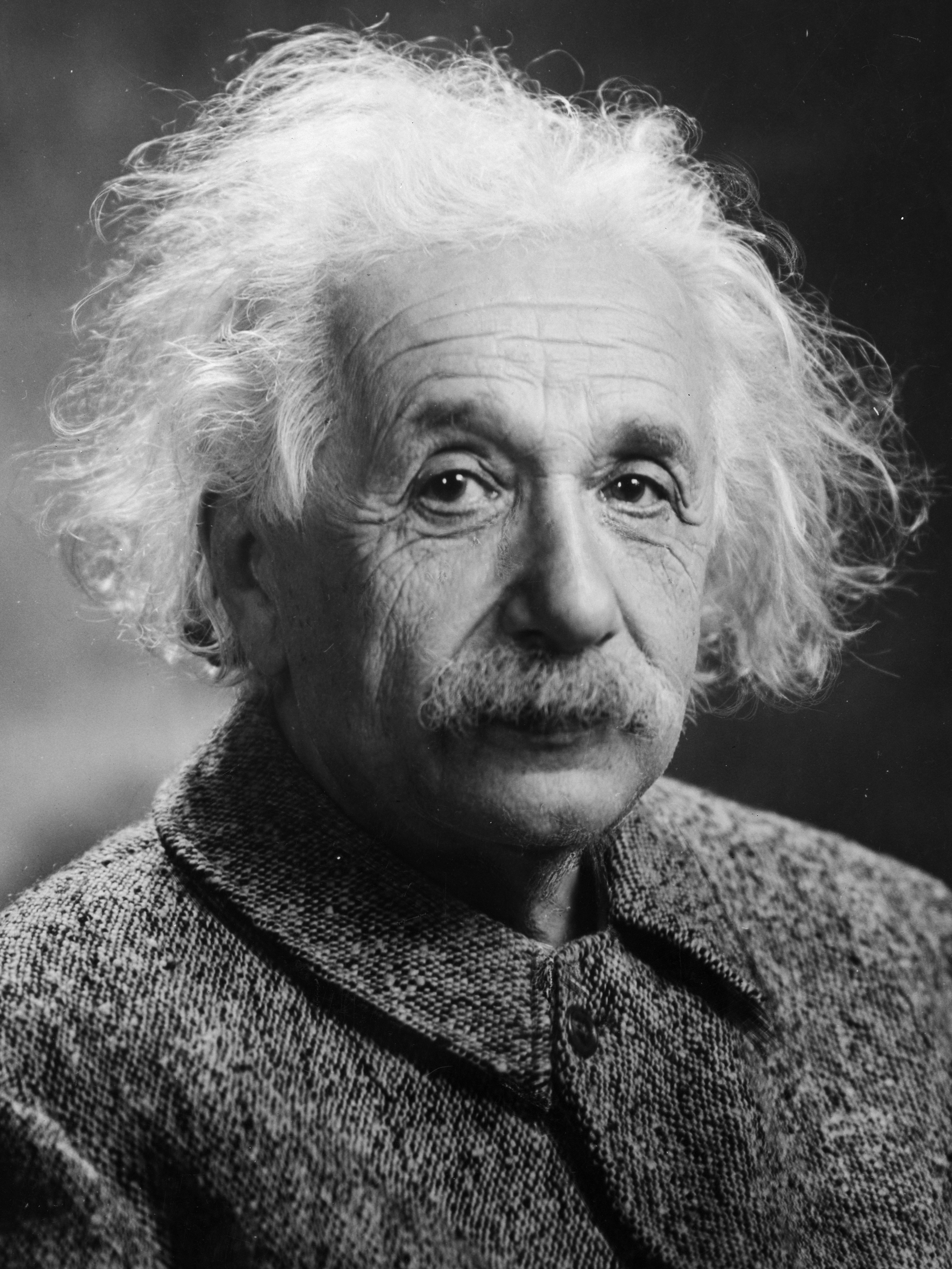
Albert Einstein (1947) defended Condon

Defenders included Albert Einstein and Harold Urey. The entire physics department of Harvard and numerous professional organizations wrote Truman on Condon's behalf. The Emergency Committee of Atomic Scientists held a dinner on April 12, 1948, to demonstrate support, with nine Nobel Prize winners among the sponsors. The National Academy of Sciences, by contrast, considered only a statement criticizing HUAC's procedures rather than defending Condon. Despite widespread support among its members (275 to 35), the National Academy of Sciences' leadership did not release a statement, and instead opted to speak privately with Rep. Thomas. On July 15, 1948, the Atomic Energy Commission granted Condon a security clearance, allowing him to access classified information at NIST.

In September 1948, at the Annual Meeting of the American Association for the Advancement of Science (AAAS), President Truman, with Condon sitting nearby on the dais, denounced Rep. Thomas and HUAC on the grounds that vital scientific research "may be made impossible by the creation of an atmosphere in which no man feels safe against the public airing of unfounded rumors, gossip and vilification". He called HUAC's activities "the most un-American thing we have to contend with today. It is the climate of a totalitarian country". Condon opposed any cooperation with Congressional attempts to identify security risks within the scientific community. In June 1949, in a sharply critical letter to Oppenheimer, who had provided information to HUAC about a colleague, he wrote: "I have lost a good deal of sleep trying to figure out how you could have talked this way about a man whom you have known for so long, and of whom you know so well what a good physicist and good citizen he is." In July 1949, he testified before a Senate subcommittee that was considering rules governing the operation of Senate committees. He criticized Thomas and the HUAC for holding closed hearings and then leaking information that denigrated his loyalty and that of other scientists. He said that the committee denied his and his colleagues' requests for public hearings so they could respond.

In 1949, Edward R. Murrow had colleague Don Hollenbeck contribute to the innovative media-review program, CBS Views the Press over the radio network's flagship station WCBS. Hollenbeck discussed Edward U. Condon, Alger Hiss, and Paul Robeson. Regarding Condon, Hollenbeck critiqued anti-communists for going about their business the wrong way:

Communists want nothing more than to be lumped with freedom-loving non-Communists [like Condon] ... This simply makes it easier for them to conceal their true nature, and to allege that the term 'Communist' is meaningless ... At the same time, we cannot let abuses deter us from the legitimate exposing of real Communists.

==== 1950s ====
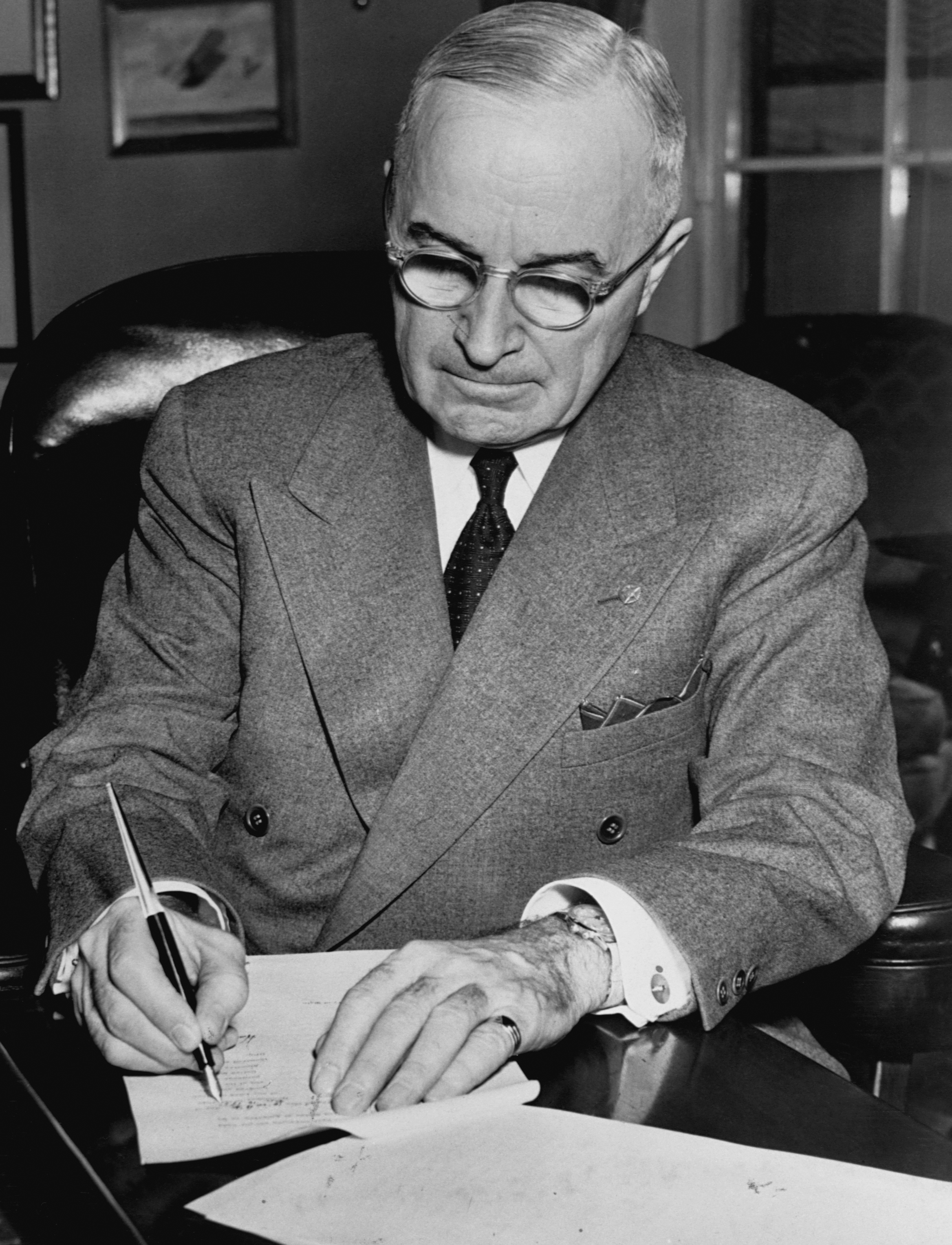
President Harry S. Truman (here, signing a proclamation declaring a national emergency and authorizing U.S. entry into the Korean War) nominated Condon as NBS director in 1945

With his record finally cleared in 1951, Condon left government to become head of research and development for the Corning Glass Works. He said his $14,000 annual government salary was his reason for the move. President Truman issued a statement of praise: "You have served in a most critical position with continued and loyal attention to your duties as director, and by reason of your standing among scientists and the supervision you have given to the bureau's activities, you have made of it a more important agency than it has ever been before". Two Republican Congressmen asserted that Condon was being investigated as a security risk and was leaving "under fire", a charge the Secretary of Commerce Charles Sawyer denied.

In 1951, Condon served as president of the Philosophical Society of Washington. On December 27, 1951, Condon was elected to head the AAAS in 1953. (Note: The New York Times says he was to be president of the organization in 1954, but Wang, "Security", 265, establishes that the term was 1953.) In September 1952, Condon, in testimony before a Congressional committee, had his first opportunity to deny under oath all charges of disloyalty that had been made against him. The HUAC concluded in its annual report for 1952 that Condon was unsuited for a security clearance because of his "propensity for associating with persons disloyal or of questionable loyalty and his contempt for necessary security regulations". On December 30, 1952, Condon assumed the presidency of the AAAS at its annual meeting, where, according to the Bulletin of the Atomic Scientists, "The tremendous ovation by his fellow members accompanying his induction was a further affirmation of their faith in his loyalty and integrity".

Five months later Condon's clearance was revoked as was standard when someone left government service. He was granted a security clearance once more on July 12, 1954. It was announced on October 19 and then suspended by Secretary of the Navy Charles S. Thomas on October 21. Vice President Nixon took credit for the suspension, and the Atomic Scientists of Chicago charged "political abuse of the national security system", though Secretary Thomas denied Nixon had played a role. Condon withdrew his application for clearance and in December resigned from Corning because the company was seeking government research contracts and he lacked the clearance necessary for participating in military research. After citing the security reviews he had passed over the years, he said: "I am unwilling to continue a potentially indefinite series of reviews and re-reviews". Corning had paid Condon's clearance-related legal expenses while he worked there.

In 1958, Condon wrote that his decision reflected his belief that the Eisenhower administration "was committed by policy to the persecution of scientists, or, at the very least, to a callous indifference toward what others were doing to attack and discredit them. I decided the situation was hopeless, and that I had done all that could be reasonably expected of me in having resisted these forces for seven long years".

Years later, Carl Sagan reported how Condon described one encounter with a loyalty review board. A board member stated his concern: "Dr. Condon, it says here that you have been at the forefront of a revolutionary movement in physics called ... quantum mechanics. It strikes this hearing that if you could be at the forefront of one revolutionary movement ... you could be at the forefront of another". Condon said he replied: "I believe in Archimedes' Principle, formulated in the third century B.C. I believe in Kepler's laws of planetary motion, discovered in the seventeenth century. I believe in Newton's laws ..." and continued with a catalog of scientists from earlier centuries, including the Bernoulli, Fourier, Ampère, Boltzmann, and Maxwell. He once said privately: "I join every organization that seems to have noble goals. I don't ask whether it contains Communists."

=== Academia ===
Condon was professor of physics at Washington University in St. Louis from 1956 to 1963 and then at the University of Colorado Boulder from 1963, where he was also a fellow of the Joint Institute for Laboratory Astrophysics, until retiring in 1970.

From 1966 to 1968, Condon directed Boulder's UFO Project, known as the Condon Committee. He was chosen for his eminence and his lack of any stated position on UFOs. He later wrote that he agreed to head the project "on the basis of appeals to duty to do a needed public service" on the part of the U.S. Air Force Office of Scientific Research. Its 1968 final report – which drew on Project Blue Book information from the USAF, as well as reports collected by two civilian organisations – concluded that unidentified flying objects had prosaic explanations.

Condon was also president of the American Institute of Physics and the American Association of Physics Teachers in 1964. He was President of the Society for Social Responsibility in Science (1968–69) and was co-chair of the National Committee for a Sane Nuclear Policy (1970). He co-edited the Handbook of Physics with Hugh Odishaw of the University of Arizona. He received the Frederic Ives Medal awarded by the Optical Society in 1968. On his retirement, his colleagues honored him with the publication of a Festschrift.

== Global policy ==
He was one of the signatories of the agreement to convene a convention for drafting a world constitution. As a result, for the first time in human history, a World Constituent Assembly convened to draft and adopt the Constitution for the Federation of Earth.

== Personal life and death ==
In 1922, Condon married Chicago-born Emilie/Emma Honzik (1899–1974), who was a translator from the Czech language. They had two sons and a daughter. Their son Joseph Henry Condon (February 15, 1935 – January 2, 2012) was a physicist (Ph.D., Northwestern University) and engineer, who worked at Bell Labs on digital telephone switches and co-invented the Belle chess computer.

Condon was a Quaker, and a self-described "liberal".

Condon died on March 26, 1974, twenty-four days after his 72nd birthday, in Boulder Colorado Community Hospital. His wife Emma died just over 7 months later.

== Legacy ==
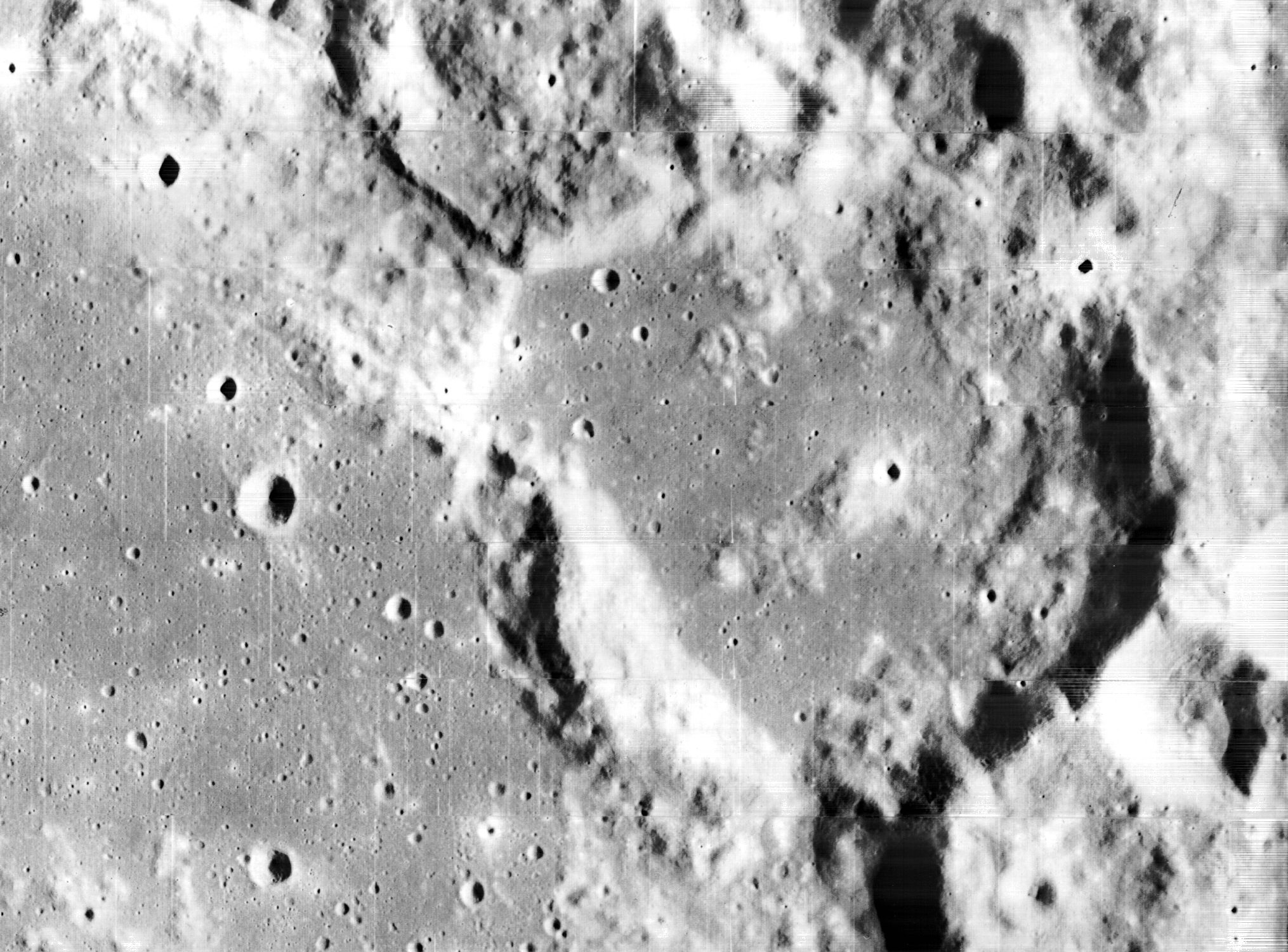
Condon crater from Lunar Orbiter 1 (NASA/L&PI image)

The National Institute of Standards and Technology (NIST) gives an annual award named for Condon. The Condon Award recognizes distinguished achievements in written exposition in science and technology at NIST. The award was initiated in 1974.

The crater Condon on the Moon is named in his honor.

Condon's colleague Lewis Branscomb said of him, "Watergate came as no surprise to Edward Condon, nor did its aftermath. I imagine he would like to have lived to see the outcome of the impeachment inquiry. But Condon understood and paid his share of the price of liberty. Somehow his idealism, his sense of humor and his inexhaustible energy made his relentless quest for a better world look like optimism."

In the 2023 film Oppenheimer, directed by Christopher Nolan, Condon was portrayed by actor Olli Haaskivi.

== Selected publications ==
- Condon, E. U.; Shortley, G. H. (1935). The Theory of Atomic Spectra. Cambridge University Press.
- Condon, E.U.; Odabaşı, Halis (1980). Atomic Structure. Cambridge University Press.

== See also ==
- Ronald Wilfred Gurney
- Quantum tunnelling
- McCarthyism
- Anti-communism

== Works cited ==
- Bird, Kai; Sherwin, Martin J. (2005). "American Prometheus: The Triumph and Tragedy of J. Robert Oppenheimer". Physics Today. 58 (11): 51–52. Bibcode:2005PhT....58k..51B. doi:10.1063/1.2155759.
- Clark, Jerome (1998). The UFO Book: Encyclopedia of the Extraterrestrial. Visible Ink. ISBN 978-1578590292.
- Dick, Steven J. (1996). The Biological Universe: The Twentieth Century Extraterrestrial Life Debate and the Limits of Science. New York: Cambridge University Press.
- Morse, Philip M. (1976). "Edward Uhler Condon: March 2, 1902–March 26, 1974". Biographical Memoirs: Volume XLVIII. National Academy of Sciences. ISBN 0-309-02349-1. Also printed as Morse, Philip M. (January 1975). "Edward Uhler Condon, 1902–1974". Reviews of Modern Physics. 47 (1): 1–6. Bibcode:1975RvMP...47....1M. doi:10.1103/RevModPhys.47.1.
- Moynihan, Daniel Patrick (1998). Secrecy: The American Experience. Yale University Press.
- Sagan, Carl (1996). The Demon-Haunted World: Science as a Candle in the Dark. New York: Ballantine Books. ISBN 978-0345409461.
- Wang, Jessica (June 1992). "Science, Security, and the Cold War: The Case of E. U. Condon". Isis. 83 (2): 238–269. doi:10.1086/356112. S2CID 144208511.
- Wang, Jessica (December 1, 2001). "Edward Condon and the Cold War Politics of Loyalty". Physics Today. 54 (12): 35–41. Bibcode:2001PhT....54l..35W. doi:10.1063/1.1445546. S2CID 153838514.
- Wheeler, John Archibald (1998). Geons, Black Holes, and Quantum Foam: A Life in Physics. New York: W.W. Norton. ISBN 978-0393046427.

Government offices
Preceded by Lyman James Briggs	4th Director of the National Bureau of Standards; 1945–1951	Succeeded by Allen V. Astin
