= Charles Greeley Abbot =

American astrophysicist (1872–1973)

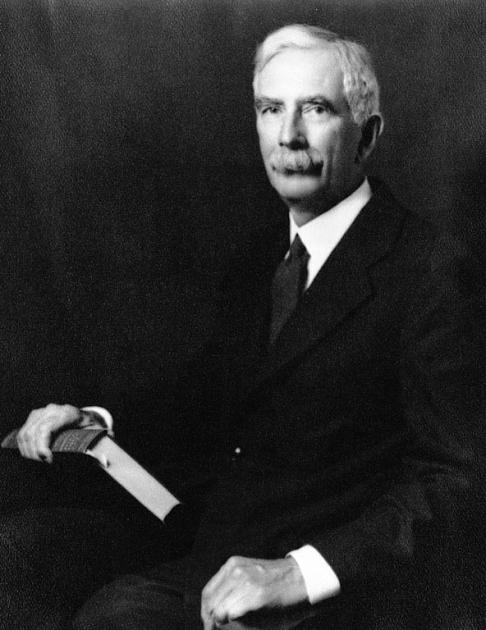
- Dr. Charles Greeley Abbot

5th Secretary of the Smithsonian Institution
- In office 1928–1944
- Preceded by: Charles Doolittle Walcott
- Succeeded by: Alexander Wetmore

Personal details
- Born: May 31, 1872 Wilton, New Hampshire
- Died: December 17, 1973 (aged 101) Riverdale Park, Maryland, U.S.
- Spouse(s): Lillian Elvira Moore Abbot (m. 1897–1944; death), Virginia Andes Johnson (m. 1954–1973; death)
- Education: Phillips Academy, Massachusetts Institute of Technology (BS)
- Known for: Noted astrophysicist who was awarded the Henry Draper Medal (1910) and the Rumford Prize (1915)

Charles Greeley Abbot (May 31, 1872 – December 17, 1973) was an American astrophysicist and also the fifth secretary of the Smithsonian Institution, serving from 1928 until 1944. Abbot went from being director of the Smithsonian Astrophysical Observatory, to becoming Assistant Secretary, and then Secretary of the Smithsonian Institution over the course of his career. As an astrophysicist, he researched the solar constant, research that led him to invent the solar cooker, solar boiler, solar still, and other patented solar energy inventions.

== Early life and education ==
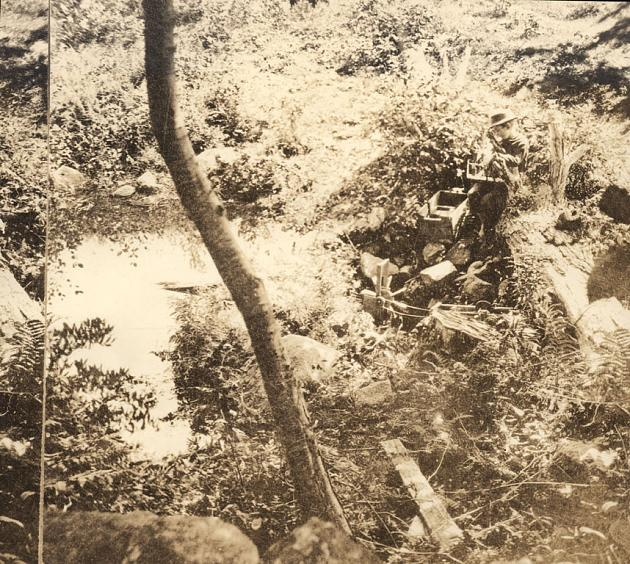
Abbot, at age eleven, with the water wheel he invented.

Charles Greeley Abbot was born in Wilton, New Hampshire. His parents, Harris Abbot and Caroline Ann Greeley, were farmers and he was the youngest of four children. As a youth he built and invented numerous things, such as a forge to fix tools, a water wheel to power a saw, and a bicycle. He dropped out of school when he was 13 to become a carpenter. Two years later he went back to high school. He attended Phillips Academy. When a friend of his went to Boston to take the entrance exam to get into the Massachusetts Institute of Technology, Abbot went for the chance to visit Boston. However, upon arrival, he was uncomfortable visiting Boston alone and chose to take the exam instead. He passed and his family gathered the funds to send him to MIT for one year. He started out studying chemical engineering, but eventually moved on to physics.

He graduated in 1894 with a Master of Science in physics. During his time in Boston, Abbot met Samuel P. Langley on the MIT campus when Langley visited seeking an assistant. In 1895, he would start working as an aide at the Smithsonian Astrophysical Observatory.

== Smithsonian Astrophysical Observatory ==
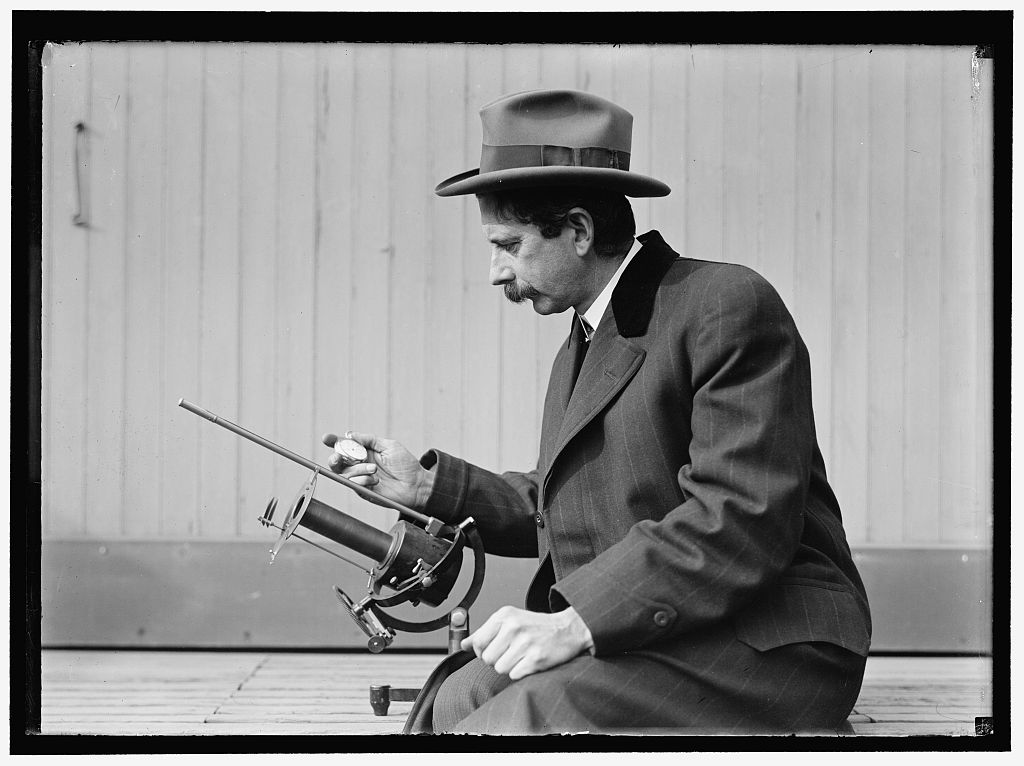
Charles Greeley Abbot, between 1913 and 1917

While at the Smithsonian Astrophysical Observatory (SAO), Abbot would work under Samuel P. Langley. Langley would go on to change his focus from solar radiation to aeronautics, with Abbot taking over solar radiation research. Abbot would participate in many expeditions. In 1900 he, along with Langley, would travel to Wadesboro, North Carolina to observe a solar eclipse, followed by another eclipse expedition to Sumatra in 1901. During his expedition experiences he would also travel to Algeria, Egypt, South Africa, Australia, and other countries, often in partnership with the National Geographic Society. Abbot would become acting director of SAO in 1906 and in 1907, Abbot became the Director of the Smithsonian Astrophysical Observatory, following the death of Samuel P. Langley. While Langley was still Director, he had visited Mount Whitney, and decided it would be a great place for an observatory. Abbot secured funding for the observatory and it was built in 1909. As Director, a position he would hold until his retirement, Abbot would open the Radiation Biology Laboratory in 1929, to study radiation effects on plants, and other organisms. This helped to develop the first wave of biophysics researchers in the United States.

== Life and work as Smithsonian Secretary ==
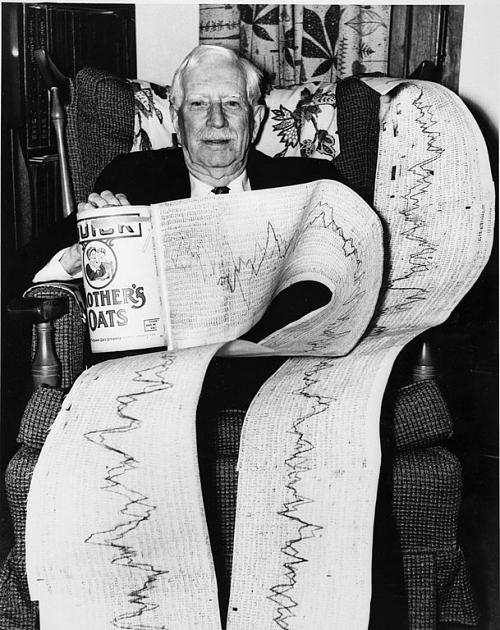
Abbot with a container full of printouts of solar observations, 1968

Abbot would become the Assistant Secretary at the Smithsonian Institution in 1918, upon the death of Frederick W. True. In his role as Assistant Secretary he would oversee the Smithsonian Institution Libraries, the International Exchange Service, and the SAO. He also co-created the Smithsonian Scientific Series books, which helped raise funds for the Smithsonian.

Ten years later, on January 10, 1928, he became the fifth Secretary of the Smithsonian after the death of Charles Doolittle Walcott. Abbot would also maintain his position as Director of the Astrophysical Observatory. In 1927, Walcott had finalized the Smithsonian's strategic plan, which Abbot took on responsibility for upon his election as Secretary. The Smithsonian began a capital campaign in 1929, coinciding with the start of the Great Depression. During this tenure, Abbot oversaw the Smithsonian's participation in Works Progress Administration projects, including the Federal Art Project. Projects included new buildings and artwork at the National Zoo, and the start of the Smithsonian's first media project, a radio show called The World is Yours. The program would be ceased in 1942 due to World War II. In the 1930s an expansion was approved for the National Museum of Natural History building, which would not begin until the 1960s. The Institute for Social Anthropology was also transferred to the Smithsonian during this time. While Secretary, Abbot would fail to acquire the National Gallery of Art for the Smithsonian. Abbot's role in the United States National Museum was also minimal, and was under the primary care of Assistant Secretary Alexander Wetmore.

He was the first Smithsonian Secretary to retire, ending his tenure on July 1, 1944. Following retirement, he was awarded Secretary Emeritus status and proceeded to continue his research work. The first Smithsonian holiday party would be held during his tenure. At the party, Abbot sang and played the cello for the partygoers. While in Washington, he was a deacon at the First Congregational Church. He also played tennis frequently at the former tennis courts at the Smithsonian Castle.

== Later life and legacy ==
During his lifetime, Abbot was elected a member of the American Philosophical Society, the United States National Academy of Sciences, and the American Academy of Arts and Sciences. On May 31, 1955, the Smithsonian held a birthday party for Abbot, marking his 83rd birthday and his 60th year of association with the Smithsonian. The event was held at the Smithsonian Castle and a bronze bust of Abbot, by Alicia Neatherly, was presented, and donated to the National Gallery of Art. Charles Greeley Abbot died, at age 101 in Maryland, on December 17, 1973. The American Solar Energy Society has an award named in Abbot's honor, which is awarded for contributions to solar energy research.

The Abbot crater on the Moon has been named after him.

== Research work ==
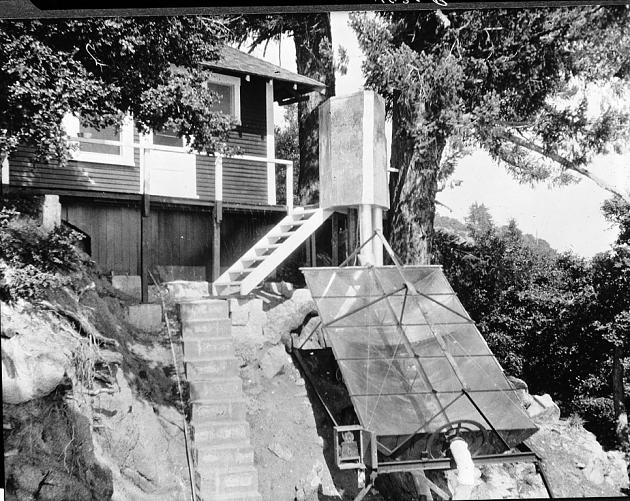
Abbot's solar cooker at Mount Wilson Observatory.

Abbot began his astrophysics research focusing on solar radiation before proceeding to chart cyclic patterns found in solar variations. With this research he hoped to track solar constant in order to make weather pattern predictions. He believed that the sun was a variable star which effected the weather on Earth, which was criticized by many contemporaries. In 1953, he discovered a connection between solar variations and planetary climate. This discovery allowed general climate patterns to be predicted 50 years in advance. He did field work at the Smithsonian Institution Shelter, which was built during his tenure as director at SAO, Lick Observatory, and Mount Wilson Observatory. At Lick, he worked with W.W. Campbell. To fight critics, Abbot would utilize balloons with pyrheliometers installed on them for measurements. He was the first scientist in America to do so, with the balloons reaching upwards of 25 kilometers. One balloon returned data that allowed Abbot to determine the solar constant at the highest point of the Earth's atmosphere. Later in his research career, he turned his focus on solar energy use.

An instrumentalist, he invented the solar cooker, which was first built at Mount Wilson Observatory, the solar boiler, and held fifteen other patents related to solar energy. For his research and contributions to the sciences, Abbot was awarded a Henry Draper Medal in 1910 and a Rumford Medal in 1916.

Abbot at the Fourth Conference International Union for Cooperation in Solar Research at Mount Wilson Observatory, 1910

== See also ==
- List of centenarians (scientists and mathematicians)
