= Cartan (crater) =

Crater on the Moon

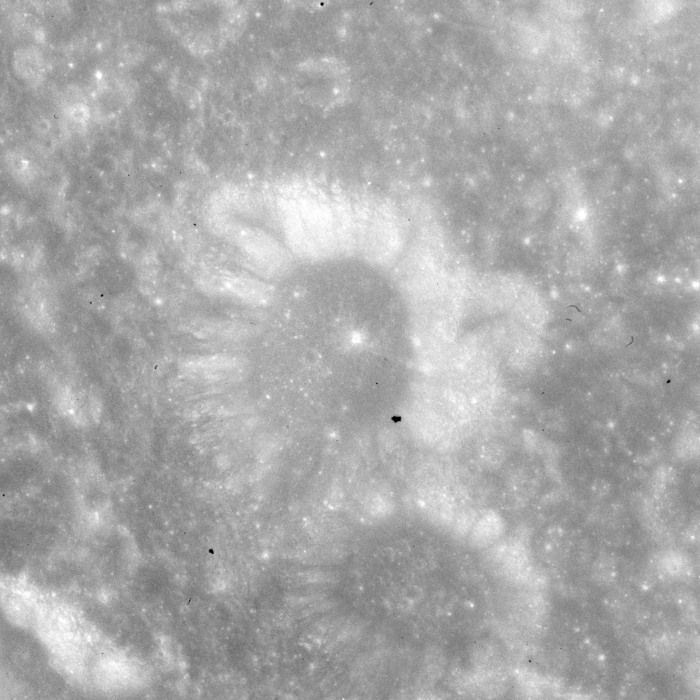
- Apollo 15 image
- Coordinates: 4.24°N 59.29°E
- Diameter: 15.62 km (9.71 mi)
- Depth: 1.6 km (0.99 mi)
- Colongitude: 301° at sunrise
- Formation: Nectarian
- Eponym: Élie J. Cartan

Cartan is a small lunar impact crater near the eastern edge of the Moon. It lies just to the west of the larger Apollonius. This crater originated from Crisium basin impact ejecta, and thus dates to the Nectarian period on the lunar geologic timescale. The rim is circular with a tiny crater along the eastern side. The interior floor is about half the diameter of the crater. A smaller crater attached to the southern rim is also attached to the north rim of Apollonius H, forming a short crater chain.

Previously identified as satellite feature Apollonius D, this crater is named after the French mathematician Élie Cartan (1869-1951). Its designation was formally adopted by the International Astronomical Union in 1976.
