= Townley (crater) =

Crater on the Moon

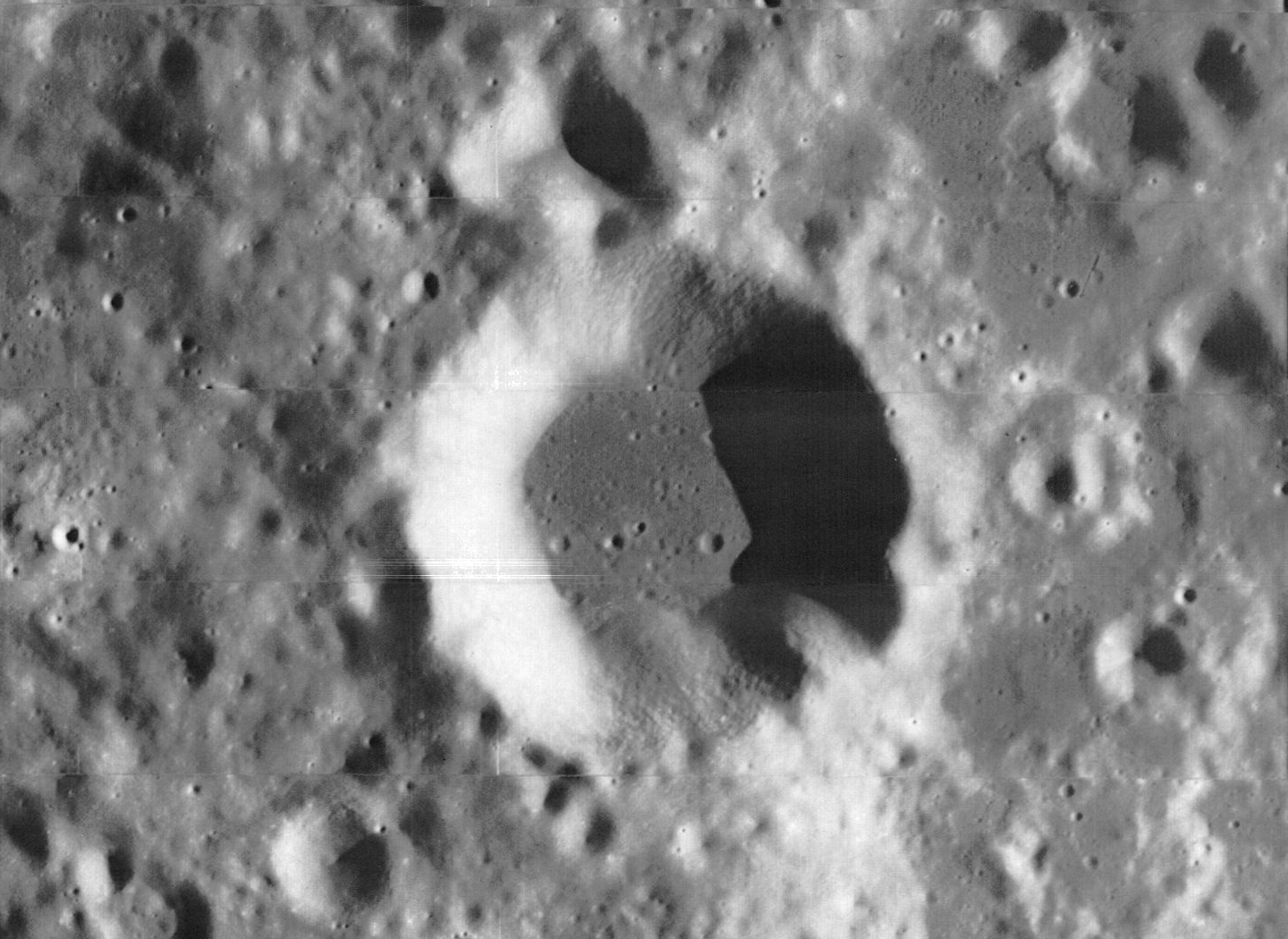
- The crater Townley from Lunar Orbiter 1. NASA/L&PI image.
- Coordinates: 3.42°N 63.19°E
- Diameter: 17.68 km (10.99 mi)
- Depth: 1.75 km
- Colongitude: 257° at sunrise
- Eponym: Sidney D. Townley

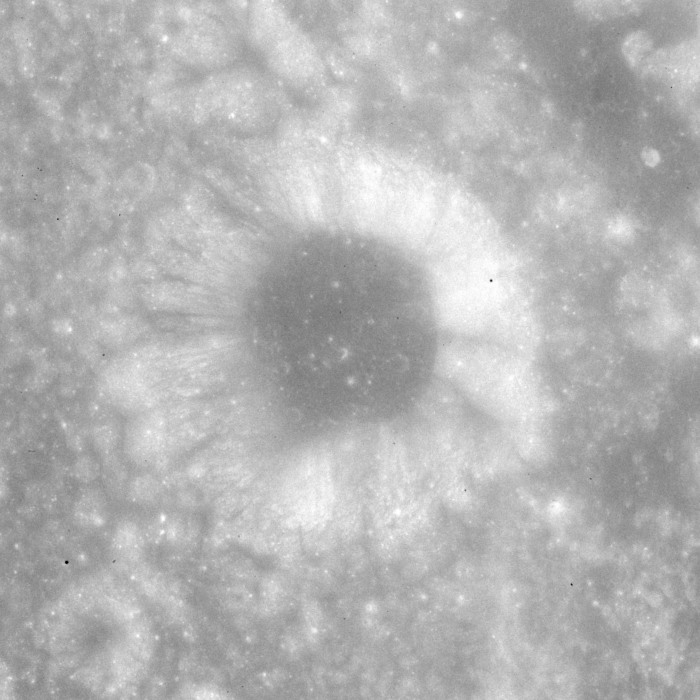
Apollo 15 image

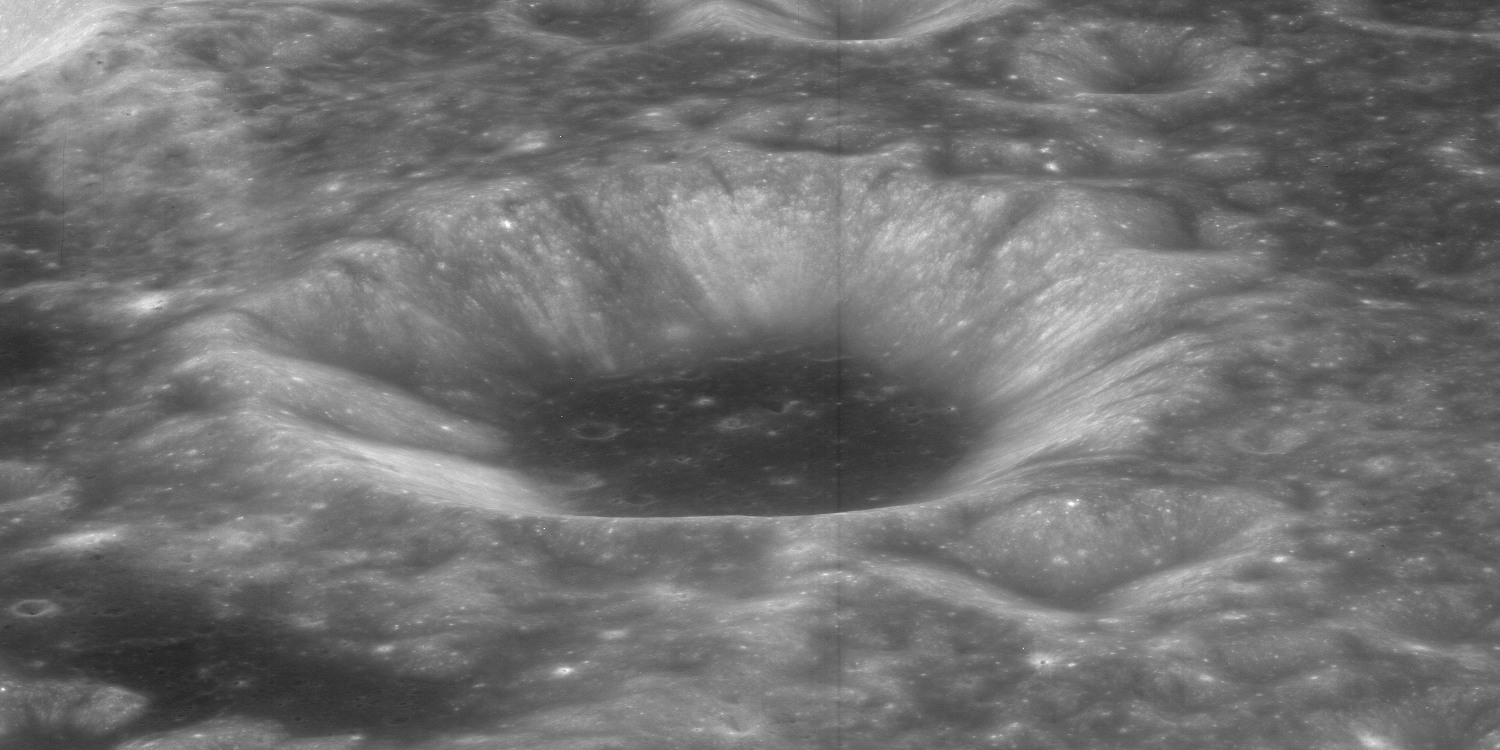
Oblique view from Apollo 17

Townley is a small lunar impact crater that is located in the eastern part of the Moon. It was named after American astronomer Sidney Dean Townley in 1976. It lies to the northwest of Mare Spumans and southeast of the crater Apollonius. This crater was previously designated Apollonius G.

This crater is generally circular, with inner wall that slopes down to a relatively dark floor that is generally flat. The albedo of this floor is similar to the lunar mare to the southeast. The rim is not significantly worn or eroded, although there is a crater-like notch along the southeast rim. A small crater is attached to the northern rim, and several tiny craters lie near the southwest side.
