= Sinus Successus =

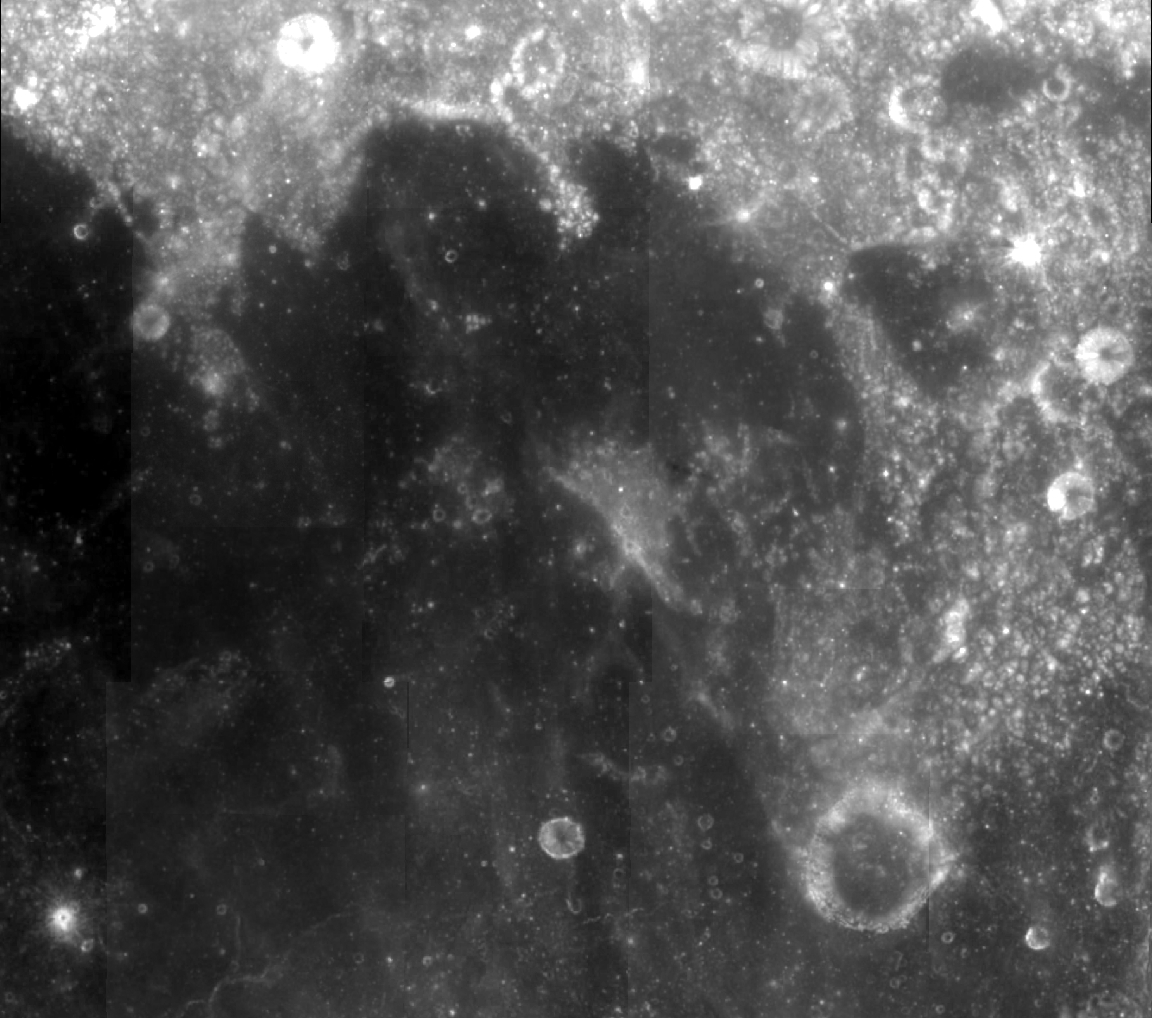
- Coordinates: 0.9°N 59.0°E
- Diameter: 132 km
- Eponym: Bay of Success

The lunar feature Sinus Successus /ˈsaɪnəs səkˈsɛsəs/ (Latin sinus successūs "Bay of Success") lies along the eastern edge of Mare Fecunditatis. It is an outward bulge that forms a type of bay. The selenographic coordinates of Sinus Successus are 0.9° N, 59.0° E, and the diameter is 132 km.

Along the eastern edge of the bay is the flooded crater Condon, and the crater Webb forms the southern end of the area. There are no other features of significance on the bay. However the terrain just to the northwest of Sinus Successus was the landing site for the Soviet Luna 18 and Luna 20 probes.
