= Mare Fecunditatis =

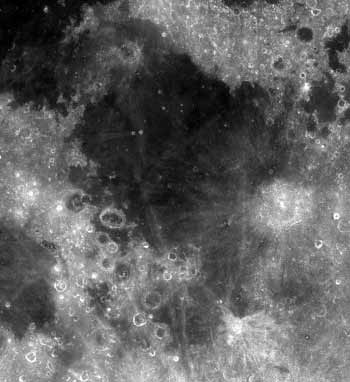
- Mare Fecunditatis
- Coordinates: 7.8°S 51.3°E
- Diameter: 840 km (520 mi)
- Eponym: Sea of Fertility

Mare Fecunditatis /fɪˌkʌndɪˈteɪtɪs/ (Latin fēcunditātis, the 'Sea of Fecundity' or 'Sea of Fertility') is a lunar mare in the eastern half of the visible Moon. The mare has a maximum diameter of 840 km.

== Description ==
The Fecunditatis basin formed in the Pre-Nectarian epoch, while the basin material surrounding the mare is of the subsequent Nectarian epoch. The mare material is of the Upper Imbrian epoch and is relatively thin compared to the neighboring Mare Crisium or Mare Tranquillitatis. This basin is overlapped with the Nectaris, Tranquillitatis, and Crisium basins. Fecunditatis basin meets Nectaris basin along Fecunditatis' western edge, with the area along this zone faulted by arcuated grabens. On the eastern edge of Fecunditatis is the crater Langrenus. Near the center lie the interesting craters Messier and Messier A. It was here that the first automated sample return took place via the Luna 16 probe, in September 1970. Sinus Successus lies along the eastern edge of the mare.

Unlike many other maria, there is no mass concentration (mascon), or gravitational high, in the center of Mare Fecunditatis. Mascons were identified in the center of other maria (such as Serenitatis or Imbrium) from Doppler tracking of the five Lunar Orbiter spacecraft in 1968. The gravity field was mapped at higher resolution with later orbiters such as Lunar Prospector and GRAIL, which unveiled an irregular pattern.

== Gallery ==
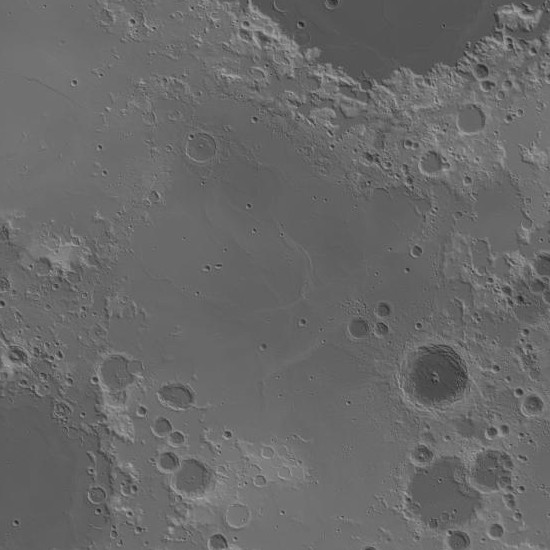
Topographic map

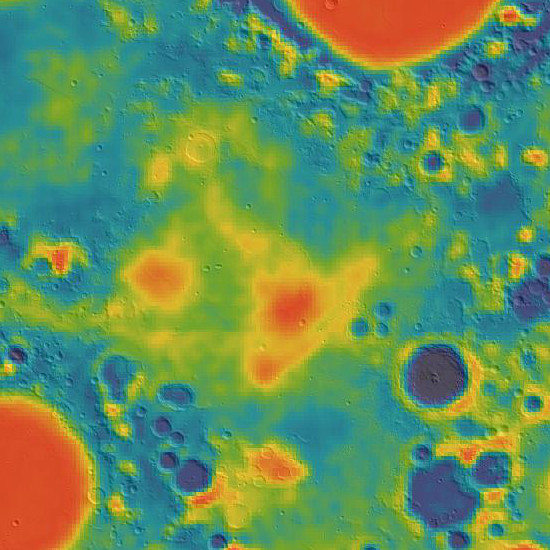
Gravity map based on GRAIL

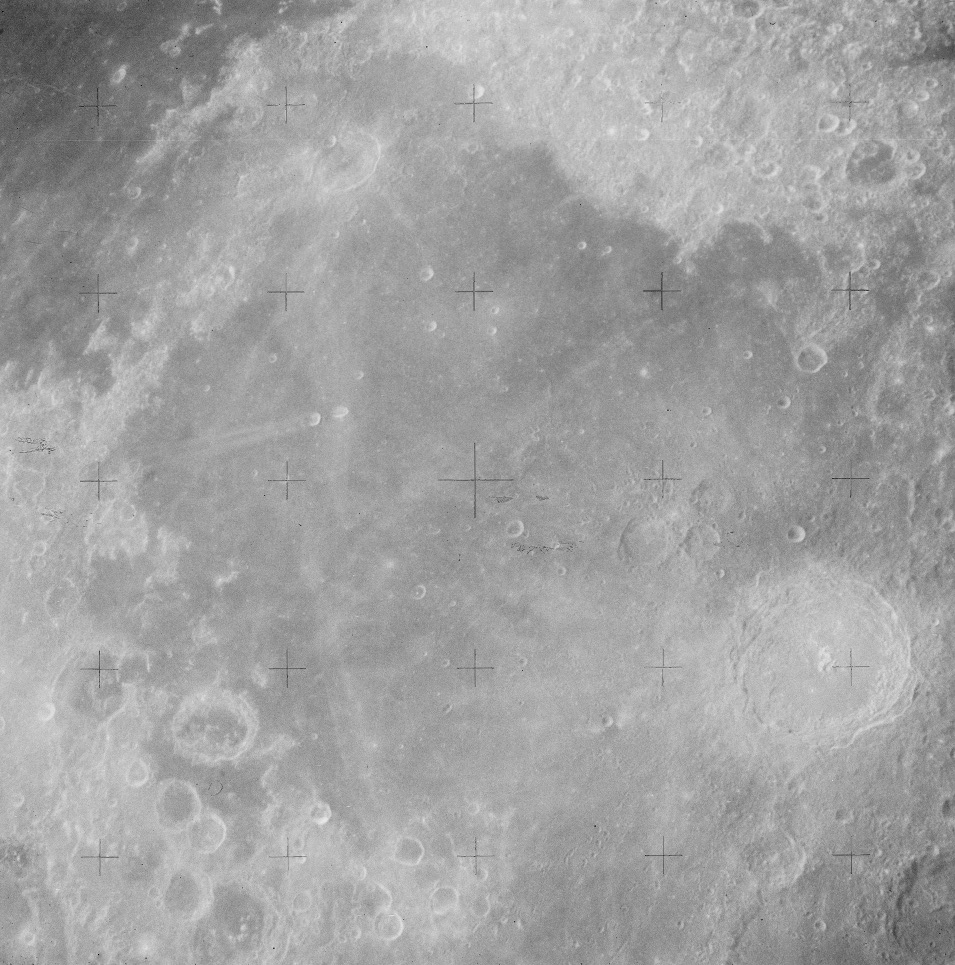
Apollo 15 image

== See also ==
- The Sea of Fertility - a tetralogy of novels by Mishima Yukio, named after the sea
