= Atwood (surname) =

Atwood is a surname. Notable people with the surname include:

- Angela Atwood (1949–1974), founding member of the Symbionese Liberation Army
- Brett Atwood, journalist, online editor and academic
- Casey Atwood (born 1980), American former NASCAR driver
- Charles Atwood (disambiguation), multiple people
- Charles B. Atwood (1849–1895), American architect
- Colleen Atwood (born 1948), Academy Award-winning costume designer
- Dave Attwood (born 1987), English rugby player
- David Attwood (film director) (1952–2024), English filmmaker
- Donald J. Atwood Jr. (1924–1994), Deputy United States Secretary of Defense under George H. W. Bush
- Donna Atwood (1925–2010), American figure skater
- Duncan Atwood (born 1955), American javelin thrower
- Eden Atwood (born 1969), American jazz musician and intersex rights activist
- Ethel Atwood (1870–?), American musician and orchestra co-founder
- Edwin W. Atwood (1875–1958), American politician
- George Atwood (1745–1807), English mathematician, inventor of the Atwood machine and chess player
- Harry Atwood (1884–1967), American engineer, inventor and aviator who landed an airplane on the White House South Lawn
- James Attwood, American businessman and political donor
- Jane Evelyn Atwood (born 1947), American photographer
- Jeff Atwood (born 1970), American software developer and entrepreneur
- Jett Atwood, American animator
- John Leland Atwood (1904–1999), American aerospace engineer and business executive
- Kimball Atwood, American anesthesiologist and skeptic of naturopathy
- Kimball Chase Atwood, American insurance company founder and grapefruit magnate, owner of the Atwood-Blauvelt mansion in Oradell, New Jersey
- Lewis R. Atwood (1860–1926), American businessman from Kentucky
- Margaret Atwood (born 1939), Canadian novelist and literary critic
- Matthias Attwood (1779–1851), British banker and politician
- Mary Anne Atwood (1817–1910), English writer on hermeticism
- Olivia Attwood (born 1991), English television personality, presenter and model
- Orville E. Atwood (1880–1939), American politician
- Reese Atwood, American softball player
- Richard Attwood (born 1940), British racing driver
- Roman Atwood (born 1983), American YouTube prankster and comedian
- Rudy Atwood (1912–1992), American pianist
- Seth G. Atwood (1917–2010), American industrialist, community leader, and horological collector
- Stephen S. Attwood (1897–1965), American engineer and professor
- Thomas Attwood (composer) (1765–1838), English composer and organist
- Thomas Attwood (economist) (1783–1856) British banker, economist, political campaigner and Member of Parliament
- Thomas Warr Attwood (c. 1733–1775), English builder, architect and local politician
- Tony Attwood (born 1952), British/Australian psychologist
- Wallace Walter Atwood (1872–1949), American geographer and geologist
- William Atwood (disambiguation), several people
