= Atwood =

Atwood may refer to:

== Places ==
=== United States ===
- Atwood, Placentia, California
- Atwood, Colorado
- Atwood, Illinois
- Atwood, Indiana
- Atwood, Iowa
- Atwood, Kansas
- Atwood, Kentucky
- Atwood, Michigan
- Atwood, Nevada
- Atwood, Oklahoma
- Atwood, Pennsylvania
- Atwood, Tennessee
- Atwood, Wisconsin

=== Elsewhere ===
- Atwood (crater), a crater on the Moon named after George Atwood
- Atwood, Ontario, Canada

== Other uses ==
- Atwood (surname)
- Ryan Atwood, a character on the television series The O.C.
- Atwood Oceanics, a defunct offshore oil and gas drilling company, now part of Valaris plc
- Atwood Stadium, an athletic facility in Flint, Michigan

== See also ==
- Atwood machine
- Atwood number
- Swinging Atwood's machine
