= Acosta (crater) =

Lunar impact crater

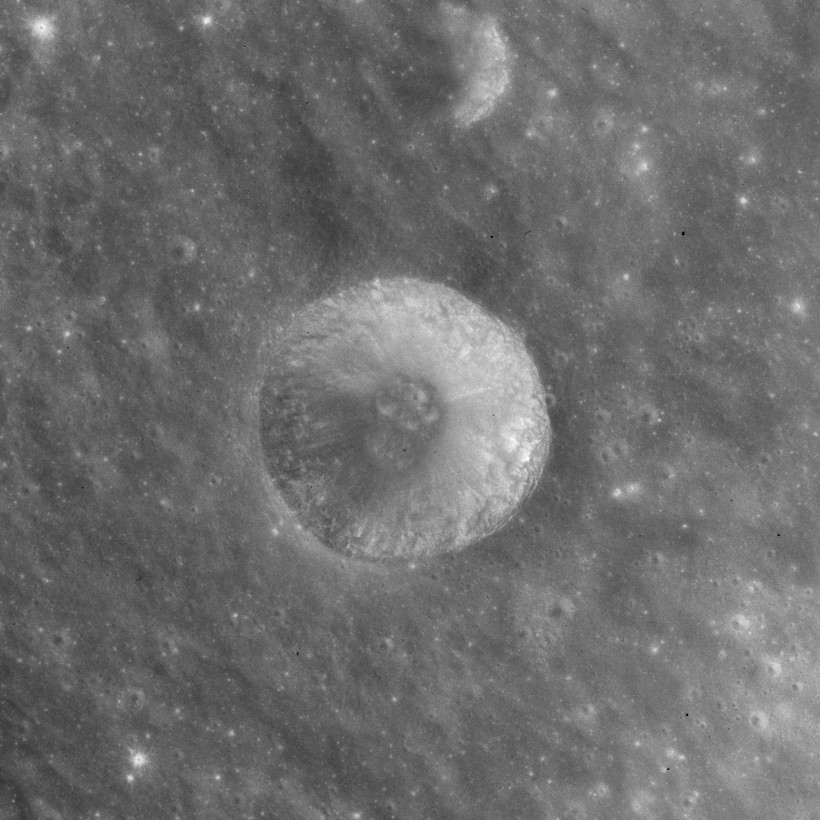
- Apollo 15 mapping camera image
- Coordinates: 5.6°S 60.1°E
- Diameter: 13.06 km (8.12 mi)
- Depth: 2.90 km (1.80 mi)
- Colongitude: 300° at sunrise
- Eponym: Cristóvão da Costa

Acosta is a small lunar impact crater located just to the north of the prominent crater Langrenus, near the east edge of Mare Fecunditatis. To the west are the trio of Atwood, Naonobu, and Bilharz. The crater is circular and bowl-shaped, with a small interior floor at the midpoint of the sloping inner walls. It has been described as a dark-halo crater by NASA.

Acosta is named after the Portuguese naturalist Cristóvão da Costa (1515-1580). This crater was designated Langrenus C prior to being renamed by the International Astronomical Union in 1976.
