= Al-Marrakushi =

Al-Marrakushi may refer to:

== People ==
- Ibn abd al-Malik al-Murrakushi, 13th-century Moroccan scholar and historian
- Ibn al-Banna al-Marrakushi, Moroccan astronomer and mathematician of the 13th and 14th centuries
- Abdelwahid al-Marrakushi, Moroccan historian of the 12th and 13th centuries
- Abu Ali al-Hasan al-Marrakushi, Moroccan astronomer who wrote his work in Egypt
- Ibn Idhari al-Marrākushi (Abū al-Abbas Ahmad ibn Muhammad), Moroccan writer and historian of the 13th and 14th centuries
- Mohammed al-Ifrani (Muhammad al-Saghir b. al-hajj Muhammad b. 'Abd Allah al-Ifrani al-Marakkushi), a Moroccan historian of the 17th and 18th centuries

== Other ==
- Al-Marrakushi (crater), an impact crater on the Moon
