= NGC 3200 =

Large galaxy in the constellation Hydra

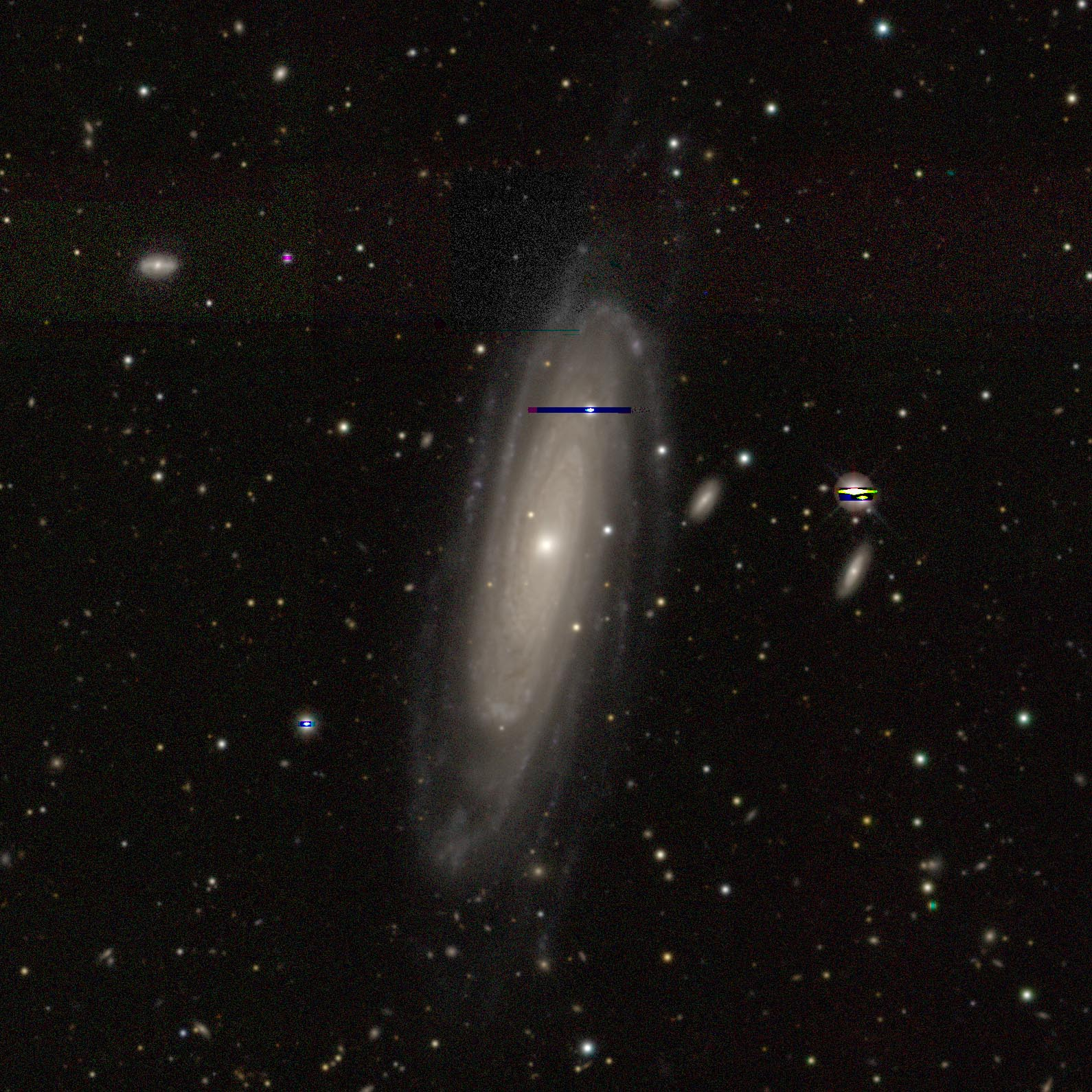
- NGC 3200 imaged by Legacy Surveys

Observation data (J2000 epoch)
- Constellation: Hydra
- Right ascension: 10^{h} 18^{m} 36.5578^{s}
- Declination: −17° 58′ 56.973″
- Apparent magnitude (B): 12.92
- Surface brightness: 23.48 mag/arcsec^{2}

Characteristics
- Type: SAB(rs)c
- Size: 87.73 kpc (286,000 ly) (diameter; 25.0 mag/arcsec^{2} B-band isophote)

Other designations
- ESO 567- G 045, UGCA 210, MCG -03-26-037, PGC 30108

NGC 3200 is a large spiral galaxy located in the constellation Hydra. Its velocity relative to the cosmic microwave background is 3,877 ± 25 km/s, which corresponds to a Hubble distance of 57.2 ± 4.0 Mpc (~187 million ly). NGC 3200 was discovered by American astronomer Edward Singleton Holden in 1882.

The luminosity class of NGC 3200 is III and it exhibits a broad HI line.

To date, 21 non-redshift measurements give a distance of 43.086 ± 12.631 Mpc (~141 million ly) which is within the Hubble distance values. Note, however, that the NASA/IPAC database calculates the diameter of a galaxy using the average value of independent measurements, when they exist, and that consequently the diameter of NGC 3200 could be about 87.83 kpc (~286,000 ly) if the Hubble distance were used to calculate it.

== Supernova ==
One supernova has been observed in NGC 3200: SN 1953D (type unknown, mag. 19.5) was discovered by Chai on 8 March 1953.

== See also ==
- List of NGC objects (3001–4000)
