= Atwode =

Atwode may refer to:

- the Atwode people
- the Atwode language
- Thomas Atwode

== See also ==
- Atwood (disambiguation)
