= Lohse (lunar crater) =

Crater on the Moon

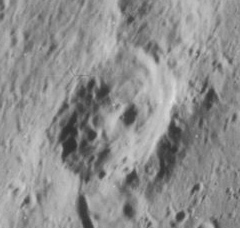
- Oblique Lunar Orbiter 4 image
- Coordinates: 13.7°S 60.2°E
- Diameter: 42 km
- Depth: 2.2 km
- Colongitude: 300° at sunrise
- Eponym: Oswald Lohse

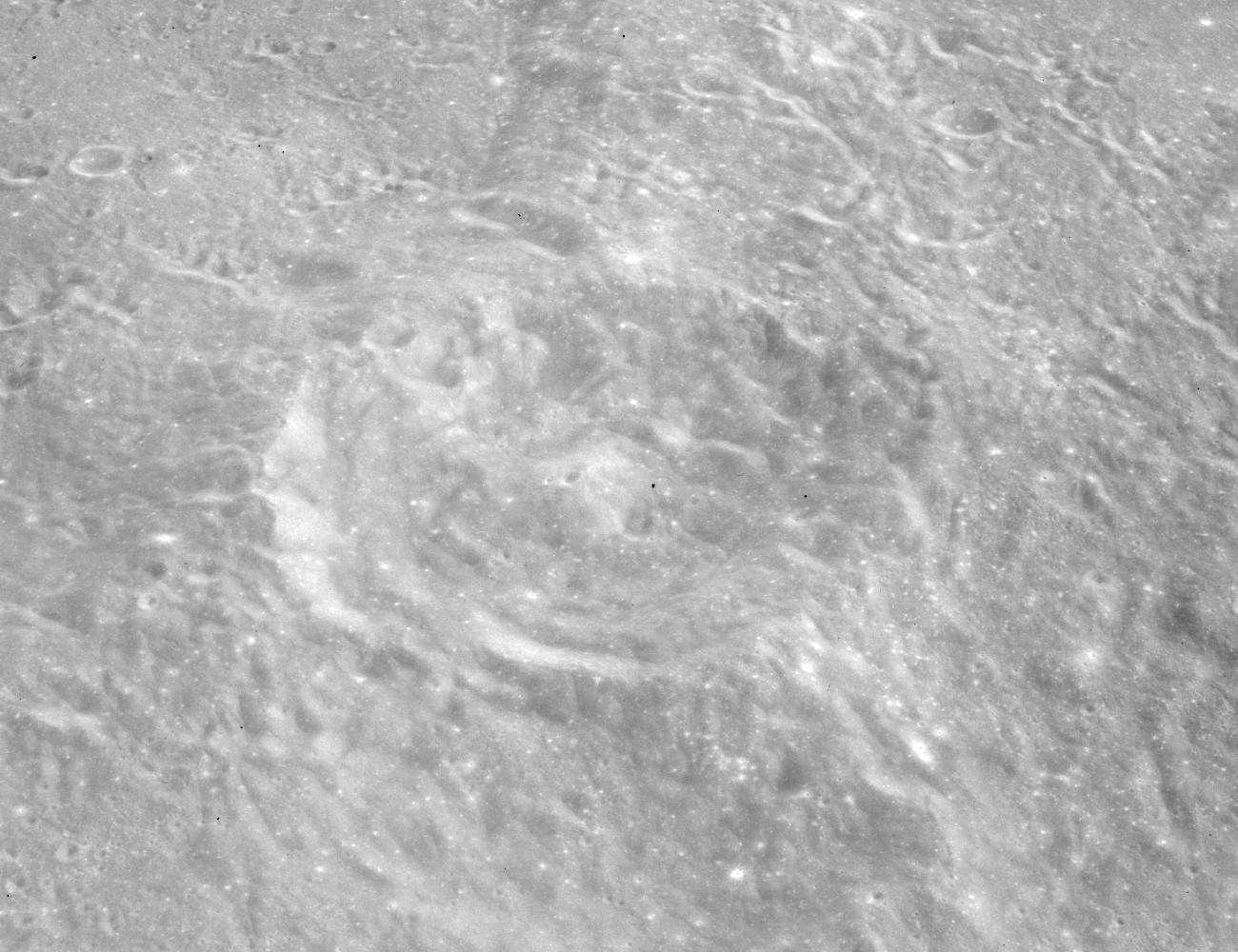
Oblique view from Apollo 15

Lohse is a lunar impact crater on the eastern edge of Mare Fecunditatis. It is attached to the north rim of the larger crater Vendelinus. To the north is the prominent Langrenus. The interior of Lohse is rough, being partially covered by ejecta from Langrenus. It has a small central peak. An older impact is attached to the north rim, designated Langrenus E.
