= Holden (lunar crater) =

Crater on the Moon

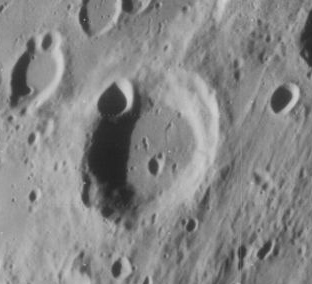
- Oblique Lunar Orbiter 4 image
- Coordinates: 19.19°S 62.53°E
- Diameter: 48 km
- Depth: 4.0 km
- Colongitude: 298° at sunrise
- Eponym: Edward S. Holden

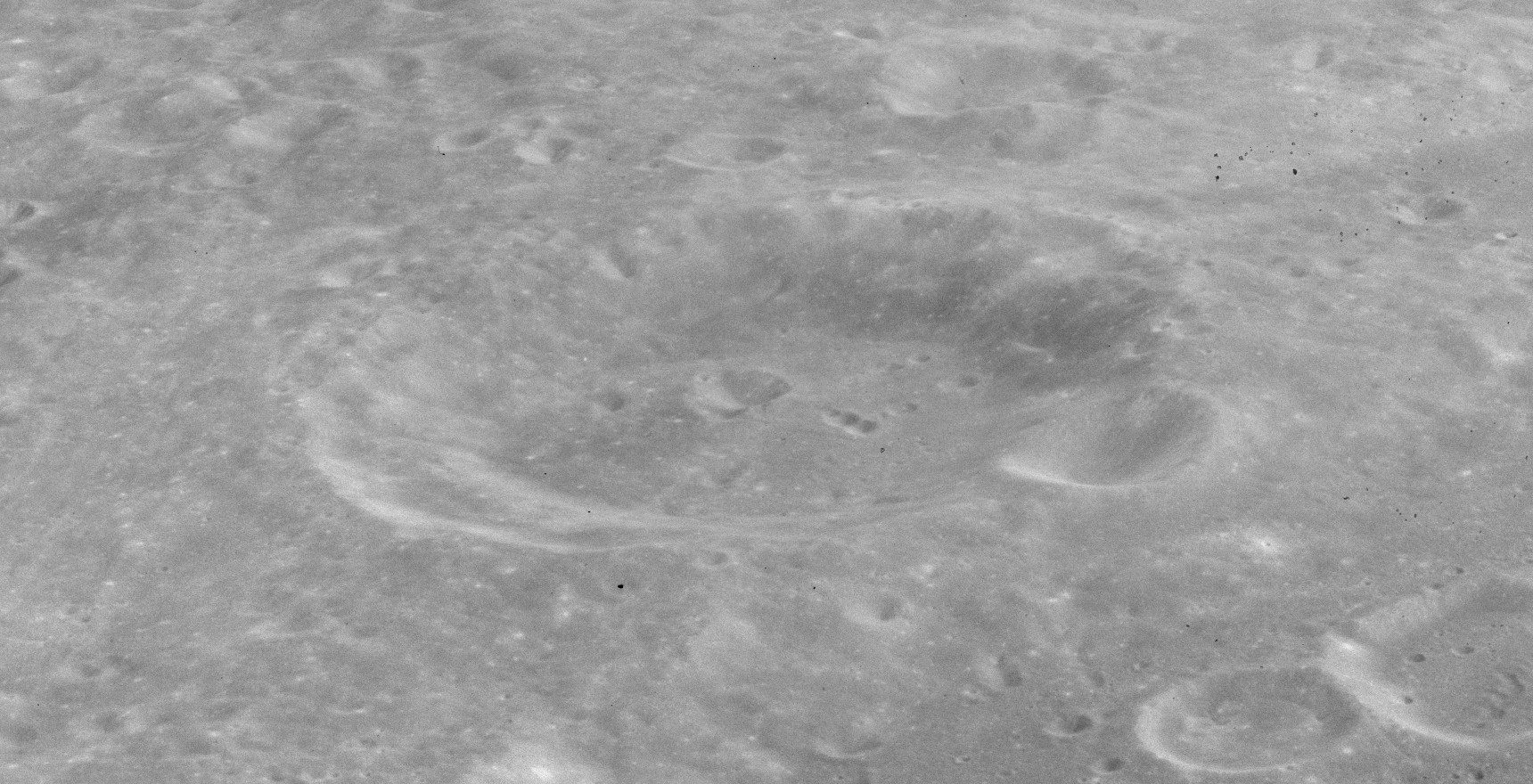
Oblique view from Apollo 15

Holden is a lunar impact crater attached to the southeast rim of the much larger crater Vendelinus. The crater rim is impacted by a craterlet on the north-northwest, and it possesses a terrace along the northeast interior wall. The floor of the crater is flat with no central peak. There is a small crater on the floor just to the south of the midpoint. It is named after Edward Singleton Holden. A crater with the same name exists on Mars.

== Satellite craters ==
By convention these features are identified on lunar maps by placing the letter on the side of the crater midpoint that is closest to Holden.

Holden	Coordinates	Diameter, km
R	20.82°S 60.99°E	18
S	20.41°S 61.56°E	14
T	19.02°S 64.17°E	9
V	18.57°S 62.07°E	12
W	18.91°S 60.02°E	12

== Unnamed dark halo craterlet ==
Southeast of Holden, an officially unnamed dark halo craterlet is noticeable before and during full moon. This dark halo craterlet is depicted on the photographic version of chart LAC 98 (page 196) in The Clementine Atlas of the Moon (Ben Bussey / Paul D. Spudis).
