= Godfried Wendelen =

Flemish astronomer and Catholic priest (1580–1667)

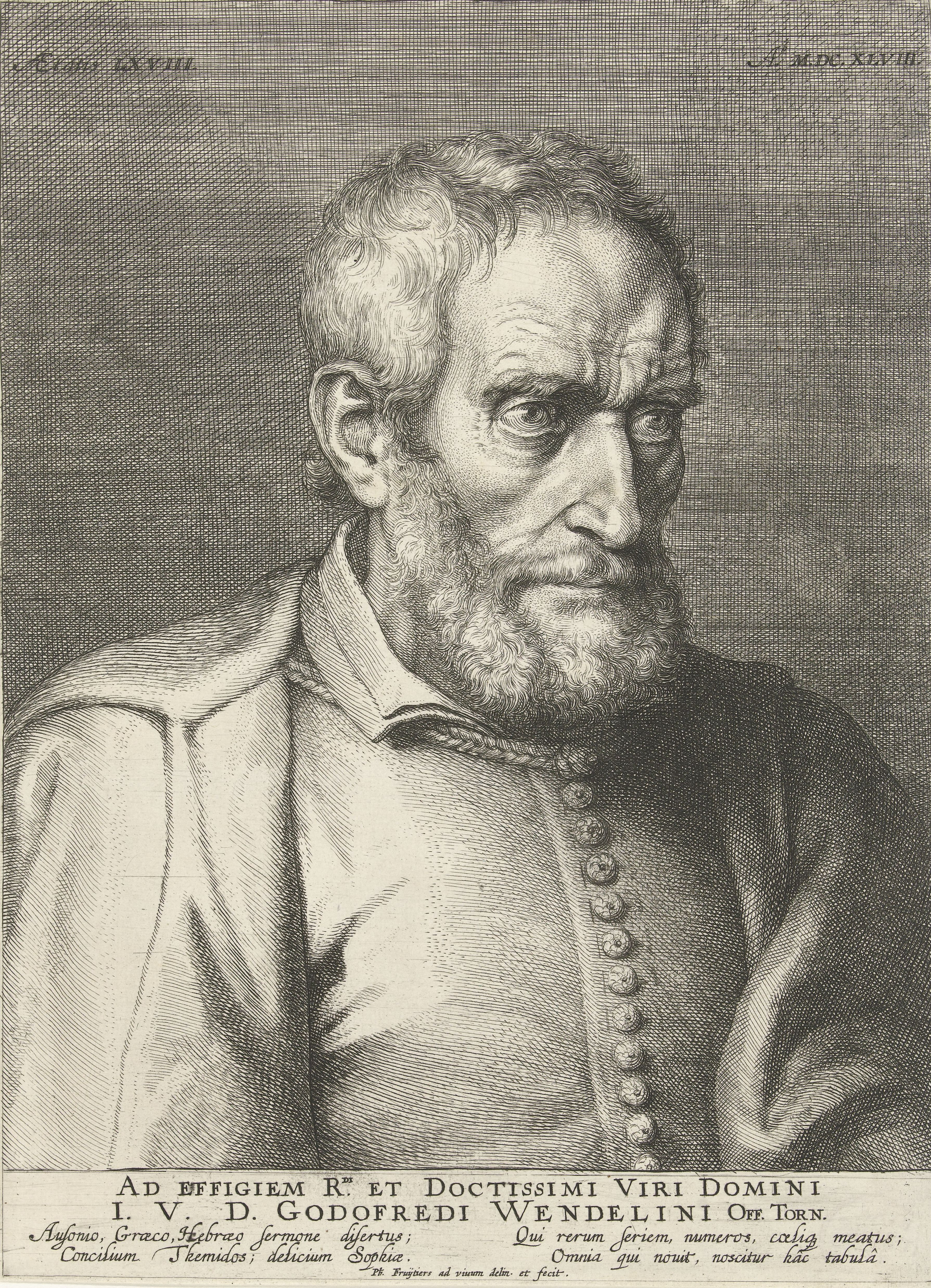
- Portrait of Godfried Wendelen at the age of 68 by Philip Fruytiers (1648)
- Born: 6 June 1580; Herk-de-Stad, Prince-Bishopric of Liège (now Belgium)
- Died: 24 October 1667 (aged 87); Ghent, County of Flanders (now Belgium)
- Education: liberal arts, utriusque juris
- Alma mater: University of Leuven
- Known for: study of lunar eclipses in Eclipses lunares ab anno 1573 ad 1643 observatae (1644); defence of heliocentrism in Tetralogica Cometica (1652)
- Scientific career
- Fields: astronomy, metereology, patristics

Godfried Wendelen or Govaert Wendelen, Latinized Godefridus Wendelinus, or sometimes Vendelinus and in French-language sources referred to as Godefroy Wendelin (6 June 1580 – 24 October 1667) was an astronomer and Catholic priest sometimes referred to as the Ptolemy of his time. He was a supporter of Copernican heliocentrism, the astronomical model which positioned the Sun at the center of the universe, with Earth and the other planets orbiting around it. He made more accurate measurements of the distance to the Sun as previously made by the ancient Greek astronomer Aristarchus of Samos. He is considered by some as a precursor of Kepler and Newton. He stayed in the Provence where he met Peiresc with whom he remained in contact throughout his life. The crater Vendelinus on the Moon is named after him.

== Life ==
Wendelen was born in Herk-de-Stad in the Prince-Bishopric of Liège (now Belgian Limburg) on 6 June 1580. His parents were Nicolaas, an alderman of Herk-de-Stad, and Elisabeth Corneli. By his own account, he first observed a lunar eclipse as a schoolboy, on 30 December 1591: it ended at quarter to six in the morning, giving him just time to get to school for his first class at six o'clock.

After studying at the Latin school in Herk he matriculated at the University of Leuven, where he studied the liberal arts under Justus Lipsius. He was a close personal friend of Lipsius's successor, Erycius Puteanus. Intending to study with Tycho Brahe Wendelen set off for Prague, but was stopped en route by an illness that necessitated his return to the Low Countries. He then spent several years in Provence. In 1599 he established the latitude of Marseille. In 1600 he travelled to Rome for the Holy Year, and then became a mathematics teacher in Digne. In 1604 he was a private tutor in the household of André d'Arnauld in Forcalquier.

In 1612 he obtained the degree of Doctor of both laws from the University of Orange. In the same year he returned to Herk for family reasons and became head of the Latin school in the town. He also began to study for the priesthood, and he was ordained in Mechelen by Mathias Hovius on 4 April 1620. He was appointed parish priest of Geetbets, which he remained until 1632. His time as parish priest was marked by disputes concerning tithes with the abbot of Vlierbeek and the provost of the Church of St. Denis (Liège), and by the keeping of an unusually meticulous parish register. It was while at Geetbets that he published Loxias seu de obliquitate solis (Antwerp, Hieronymus Verdussen, 1626), a critical overview of ancient and medieval astronomy.

Around 1630 he measured the distance between the Earth and the Sun using the method of Aristarchus of Samos. The value he calculated was 60% of the true value (243 times the distance to the Moon; the true value is about 384 times; Aristarchus calculated about 20 times).

From 1633 to 1650, Wendelen was parish priest of his home town, Herk-de-Stad. In 1633 he was also assigned a prebend in the collegiate church of Condé, to provide an income that would support his scientific work. This led to contacts with Douai University and to researches in early Christian chronology. One of his main works, Eclipses lunares ab anno 1573 ad 1643 observatae (Lunar eclipses observed from the year 1573 to 1643), was published during this period.

In 1648 he was appointed official of the ecclesiastical tribunal of the diocese of Tournai, taking up office in 1649. In 1652 his Teratologia Cometica, containing a defence of heliocentric astronomy, was printed in Tournai, dedicated to Jean-Jacques Chifflet.

During his lifetime Wendelen was recognised internationally as an astronomer, corresponding with Mersenne, Gassendi and Constantijn Huygens. He died in Ghent on 24 October 1667.

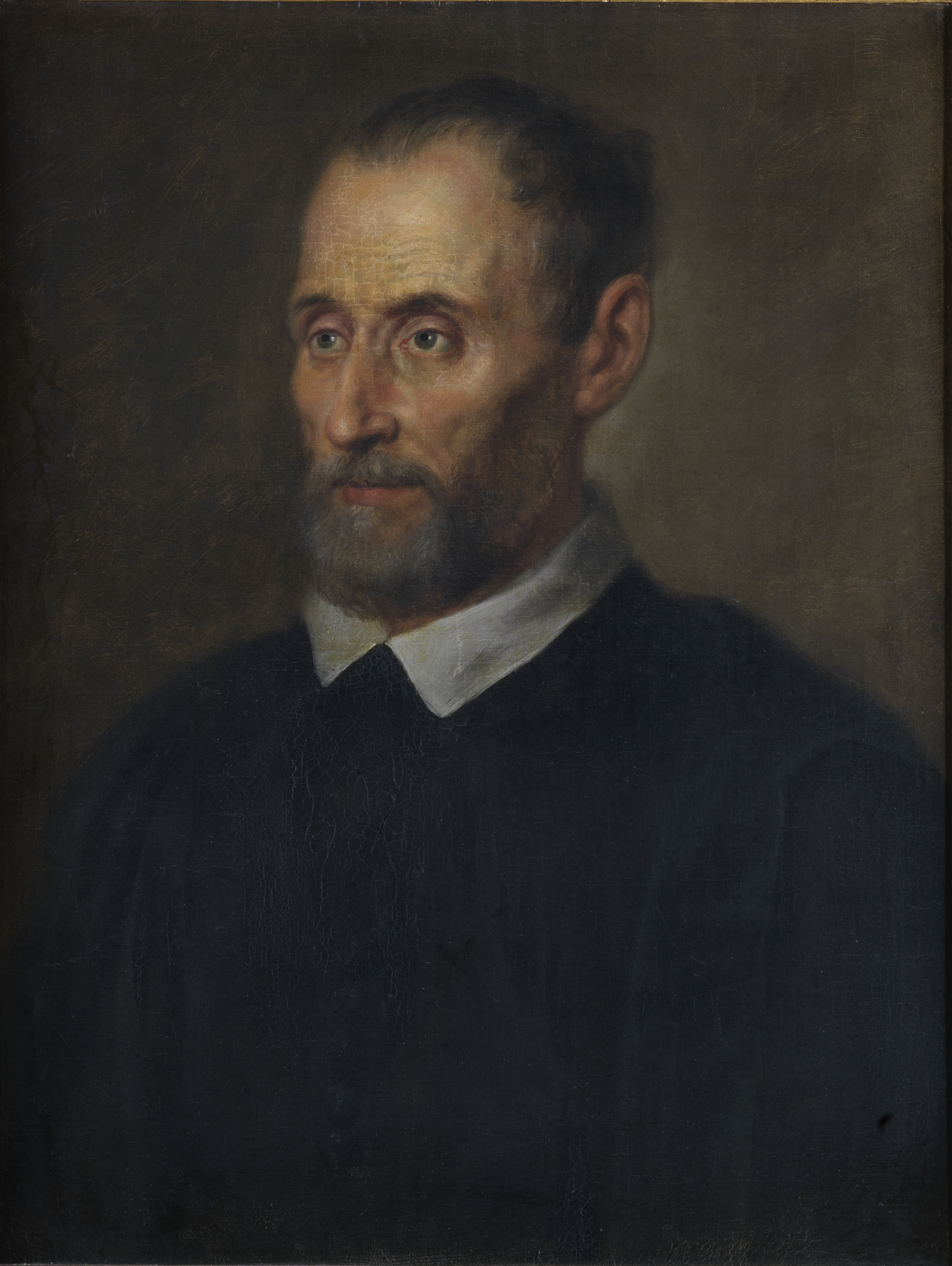
Portrait of Godfried Wendelen by Thomas Willeboirts Bosschaert

== Moons of Jupiter ==
Wendelen is credited with recognizing that Kepler's third law applied to the satellites of Jupiter. There is some ambiguity about exactly when. Pierre Costabel states that the scholarly world learned of Wendelen's discovery in 1651, when the Italian cleric and astronomer Giovanni Battista Riccioli (1598-1671) published his book Almagestum novum ... . In volume 1 of his Astronomia Reformata, Riccioli discusses the position and motion of the moons of Jupiter (Situs & Motus Satellitum Jovis) and cites Wendelen as one of his sources: "… ex Vuendelini Epistola ad me, …" (... from Wendelen's letter to me, ...). On the same page (center of right side), Riccioli again credits "Vuendelinus" with showing that Jupiter's moons obey Kepler's third law: "… ita Planetulorum Jovialium distantias a Jove, esse in ratione sequialtera suorum temporum periodicorum." (... so the three-halves power of the distances of Jupiter's satellites from Jupiter, to be in the ratio of their periodic times.) On page 370 (near end of paragraph 4 on right side of page), during a discussion of the number of moons of Jupiter (De Numero Satellitum Jovis), he cites as a source: "Deniq; Vuendelinus in Epistola ad me anni 1647." (Finally; Wendelen in a letter to me in the year 1647.) This might suggest that Wendelen made his discovery in the 1640s. However, Pierre Costabel states that Peiresc (1580-1637) made observations of Jupiter's moons in 1610, a time when Wendelen was living near Peiresc, and that by 1624, Wendelen was using Peiresc's data to construct tables of the motions of Jupiter's moons, so that navigators could determine their longitude. Johannes Kepler recognized at least as early as 1622 that Jupiter's moons obey his third law. He discussed Jupiter's moons in his Epitome Astronomiae Copernicanae [Epitome of Copernican Astronomy] (Linz ("Lentiis ad Danubium"), (Austria): Johann Planck, 1622), book 4, part 2, page 554.

Original : 4) Confirmatur vero fides hujus rei comparatione quatuor Jovialium et Jovis cum sex planetis et Sole. Etsi enim de corpore Jovis, an et ipsum circa suum axem convertatur, non-ea documenta habemus, quae nobis suppetunt in corporibus Terrae et praecipue Solis, quippe a sensu ipso: at illud sensus testatur, plane ut est cum sex planetis circa Solem, sic etiam se rem habere cum quatuor Jovialibus, ut circa corpus Jovis quilibet, quo longius ab illo potest excurrere, hoc tardius redeat, et id quidem proportione non-eadem, sed majore, hoc est sescupla proportionis intervallorum cujusque a Jove: quae plane ipsissima est, qua utebantur supra sex planetae. Intervalla enim quatuor Jovialium a Jove prodit Marius in suo Mundo Joviali ista: 3, 5, 8, 13 (vel 14 Galilaeo) … Periodica vero tempora prodit idem Marius ista: dies 1. h. 18 1/2, dies 3 h. 13 1/3, dies 7 h. 3, dies 16 h. 18: ubique proportio est major quam dupla, major igitur quam intervallorum 3, 5, 8, 13 vel 14, minor tamen quam quadratorum, qui duplicant proportiones intervallorum, sc. 9, 25, 64, 169 vel 196, sicut etiam sescupla sunt majora simplis, minora vero duplis.

Translation : (4) However, the credibility of this [argument] is proved by the comparison of the four [moons] of Jupiter and Jupiter with the six planets and the Sun. Because, regarding the body of Jupiter, whether it turns around its axis, we don't have proofs for what suffices for us [regarding the rotation of ] the body of the Earth and especially of the Sun, certainly [as reason proves to us]: but reason attests that, just as it is clearly [true] among the six planets around the Sun, so also it is among the four [moons] of Jupiter, because around the body of Jupiter any [satellite] that can go farther from it orbits slower, and even that [orbit's period] is not in the same proportion, but greater [than the distance from Jupiter]; that is, 3/2 (sescupla ) of the proportion of each of the distances from Jupiter, which is clearly the very [proportion] as [is used for] the six planets above. In his [book] The World of Jupiter [Mundus Jovialis, 1614], [Simon] Mayr [1573-1624] presents these distances, from Jupiter, of the four [moons] of Jupiter: 3, 5, 8, 13 (or 14 [according to] Galileo) … Mayr presents their time periods: 1 day 18 1/2 hours, 3 days 13 1/3 hours, 7 days 2 hours, 16 days 18 hours: for all [of these data] the proportion is greater than double, thus greater than [the proportion] of the distances 3, 5, 8, 13 or 14, although less than [the proportion] of the squares, which double the proportions of the distances, namely 9, 25, 64, 169 or 196, just as [a factor of] 3/2 is also greater than 1 but less than 2.

== Works ==
=== Major works ===
- (1626) Loxias seu de obliquitate solis, Antwerp, apud Hieronymum Verdussium
- (1632) Aries seu Aurei Velleris encomium
- (1637) De tetracty Pythagorae dissertatio epistolica, ad Erycium Puteanum
- (1643) Arcanorum caelestium Lampas τετράλυχνος, Brussels
- (1644) Eclipses lunares ab anno 1573 ad 1643 observatae, Antwerp, apud Hieronymum Verdussium
- (1649) Leges salicae illustratae, Antwerp
- (1652) Teratologia cometica
- (1658) Arcanorum caelestium Sphinx & Oedipus seu Lampas δωδεκάλυχνος Duodecim obvelata Hexametris, quae totidam Umbrae sunt: Duodecim revelata anagrammatis, quae sunt Lumina totidem. Omnibus orbis terrarum mathematicis physicis in feram posteritatem traditur, Tournai.

=== Smaller works ===
- (1629) De diluvio liber primus, Antwerp;
- (1629) De diluvio liber secundus (incomplete);
- (1630) Parapegma ou Kalendrier pour l’an de Iesus Christ MDCXXXI;
- (1636) In id Psalmorum "Salvabis, Domine, homines et iumenta et lebes spei meae";
- (1643) Censura et iudicium de falsitate Bruxellensis;
- (1647) De causis naturalibus, pluviae purpureae Bruxellensis, Brussels
- (1655) Duorum eminentissimorum S.R.E. luminum Petri Aloysii Carafae;
- (1655) Clementis apostoli Epistolarum encycliarum altera;
- (1655) Epistola didactica de Calcedonio lapide seu gemma gnostica;
- (1659) Gnome orthodoxa temporum sacrorum inde a Petro apostolorum principe ad Alexandrum VII usque usitatorum.
- Wendelen is also the author of an anonymous pamphlet (32 pages) on local political bickering in Herk during his pastorate there. Printed without title, date or address (probably Liège, Christian Ouwerk, 1645), it begins with La Ville de Wuest-Herck, que les anciens documens... escriuent Harck (Welkenhuysen, 2000:445).

== See also ==
- List of Roman Catholic scientist-clerics
