= Vendelinus (crater) =

Crater on the Moon

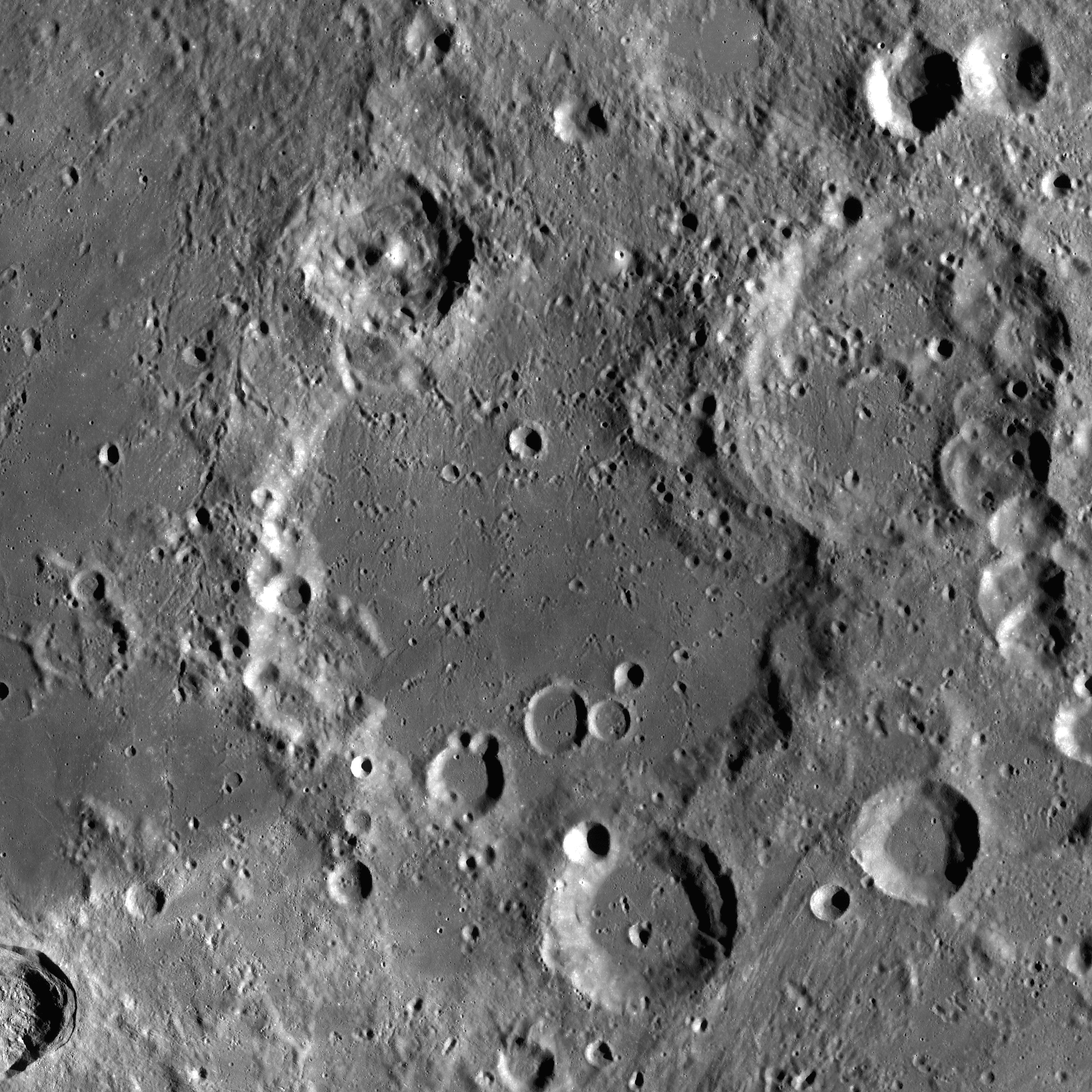
- Mosaic of photos by Lunar Reconnaissance Orbiter. Width is 270 km.
- Coordinates: 16.46°S 61.55°E
- Diameter: 147 km
- Depth: 2.2 km
- Colongitude: 300° at sunrise
- Eponym: Godefroy Wendelin

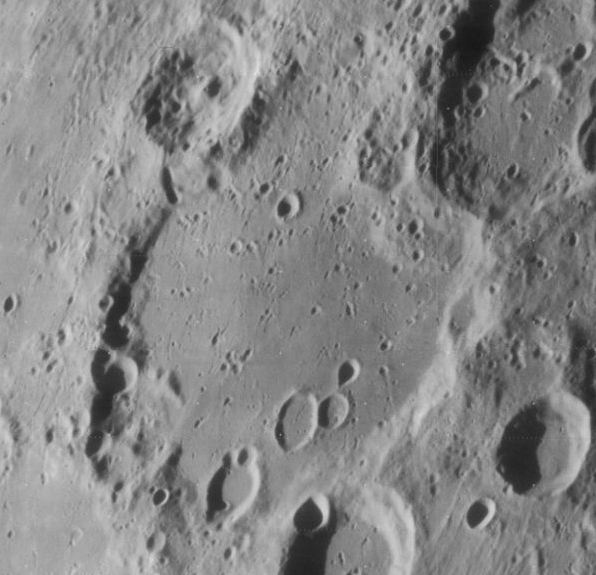
Oblique Lunar Orbiter 4 image

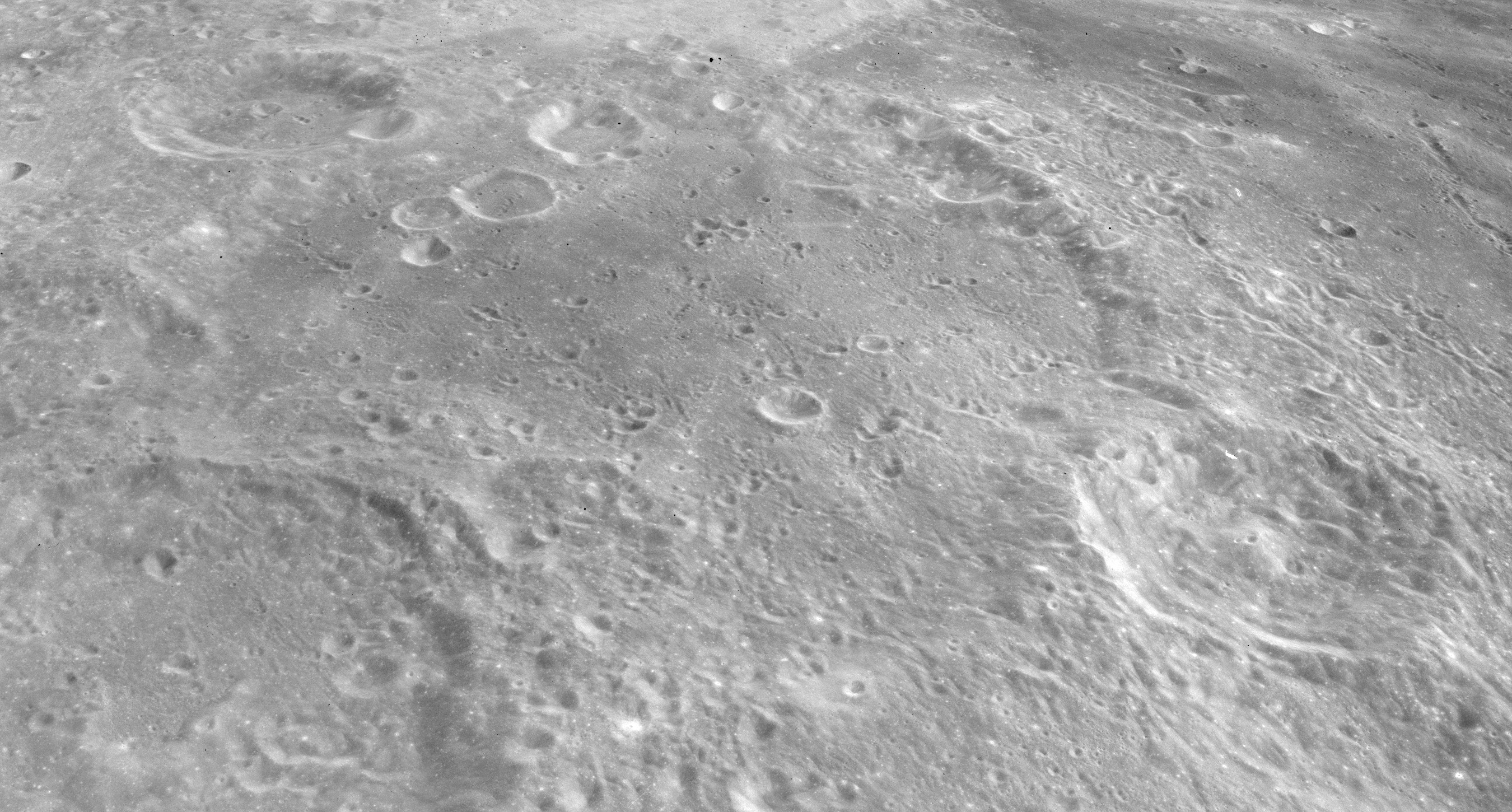
Oblique view from Apollo 15

Vendelinus is an ancient lunar impact crater located on the eastern edge of Mare Fecunditatis. To the north of Vendelinus is the prominent crater Langrenus, while to the southeast is Petavius, forming a chain of prominent craters near the eastern rim. Due to its location, the crater appears oblong due to foreshortening.

The crater was named after a Flemish astronomer Godefroy Wendelin in 1651 by Giovanni Riccioli. In 1935 this name was approved by International Astronomical Union.

The crater is heavily worn and overlapped by multiple craters, making this feature more difficult to identify except at low sun angles. The irregular rim is broken in several locations by overlapping craters. The most prominent of these is the break in the northeast wall from the overlapping crater Lamé. The smaller Lohse overlaps the rim to the northwest, and at the south end the crater wall is joined to Holden.

The floor of Vendelinus is flat and covered by a dark lava flow. (Webb noted that a dark patch could be seen on the floor of this crater at full moon.) It lacks a central peak, but includes multiple impact craters of various dimensions. Some of these are secondary craters from Langrenus, and display an oblong shape. The outer ramparts of Lamé form a rise on the northeastern floor.

== Satellite craters ==
By convention these features are identified on lunar maps by placing the letter on the side of the crater midpoint that is closest to Vendelinus.

Vendelinus	Coordinates	Diameter, km
D	19.05°S 58.24°E	10
E	18.08°S 61.02°E	20
F	18.49°S 64.92°E	32
H	15.30°S 61.50°E	8
K	13.82°S 62.44°E	9
L	17.56°S 61.79°E	17
N	16.82°S 65.87°E	17
P	17.56°S 66.33°E	16
S	15.40°S 57.98°E	6
T	13.49°S 62.80°E	6
U	15.91°S 58.73°E	5
V	15.55°S 55.92°E	6
W	14.59°S 58.70°E	5
Y	17.58°S 62.24°E	11
Z	17.20°S 62.41°E	7

The following craters have been renamed by the IAU:

- Vendelinus C — See Lamé (crater).
