= 872 Holda =

Main-belt asteroid

Discovery
- Discovered by: Max Wolf
- Discovery site: Heidelberg
- Discovery date: 21 May 1917

Designations
- Alternative designations: 1917 BZ

Orbital characteristics
- Epoch 31 July 2016 (JD 2457600.5)
- Uncertainty parameter 0
- Observation arc: 115.56 yr (42207 days)
- Aphelion: 2.9483 AU (441.06 Gm)
- Perihelion: 2.5146 AU (376.18 Gm)
- Semi-major axis: 2.7315 AU (408.63 Gm)
- Eccentricity: 0.079385
- Orbital period (sidereal): 4.51 yr (1648.9 d)
- Mean anomaly: 8.17394°
- Mean motion: 0° 13^{m} 5.988^{s} / day
- Inclination: 7.3752°
- Longitude of ascending node: 194.738°
- Argument of perihelion: 17.534°

Physical characteristics
- Mean radius: 15.02±1.25 km
- Synodic rotation period: 5.945 h (0.2477 d)
- Geometric albedo: 0.2127±0.041
- Absolute magnitude (H): 9.91

872 Holda is a minor planet orbiting the Sun.

The asteroid is named after Edward Singleton Holden, an American astronomer.
