= Somerville (crater) =

Crater on the Moon

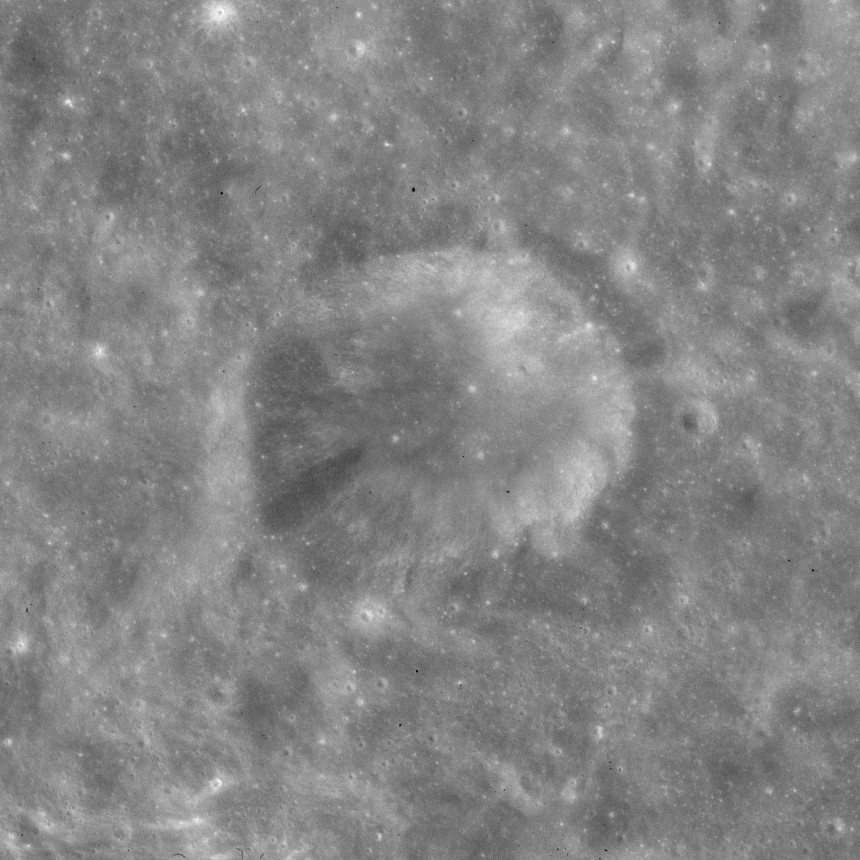
- Apollo 15 mapping camera image
- Coordinates: 8.3°S 64.9°E
- Diameter: 15 km
- Depth: Unknown
- Colongitude: 296° at sunrise
- Eponym: Mary F. Somerville

Somerville is a small lunar impact crater in the eastern part of the Moon. It lies to the east of the prominent crater Langrenus, and was designated Langrenus J before being given a name by the IAU. This is a roughly circular, bowl-shaped formation, with the larger but less conspicuous Langrenus H attached to the northwest rim. The rim has a protruding lip that extends slightly toward the southwest.

This is one of a handful of lunar craters named after a woman, Mary Somerville.
