= Lamé (crater) =

Lunar impact crater

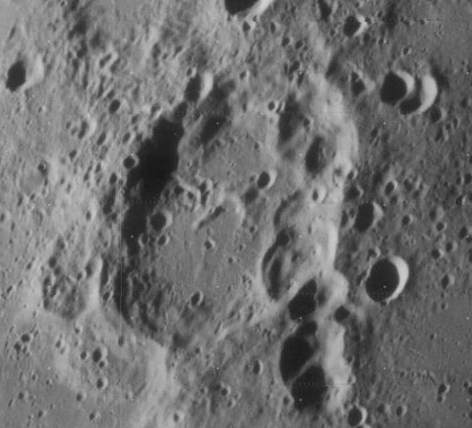
- Oblique Lunar Orbiter 4 image
- Coordinates: 14.7°S 64.5°E
- Diameter: 84 km
- Depth: 3.3 km
- Colongitude: 296° at sunrise
- Eponym: Gabriel Lamé

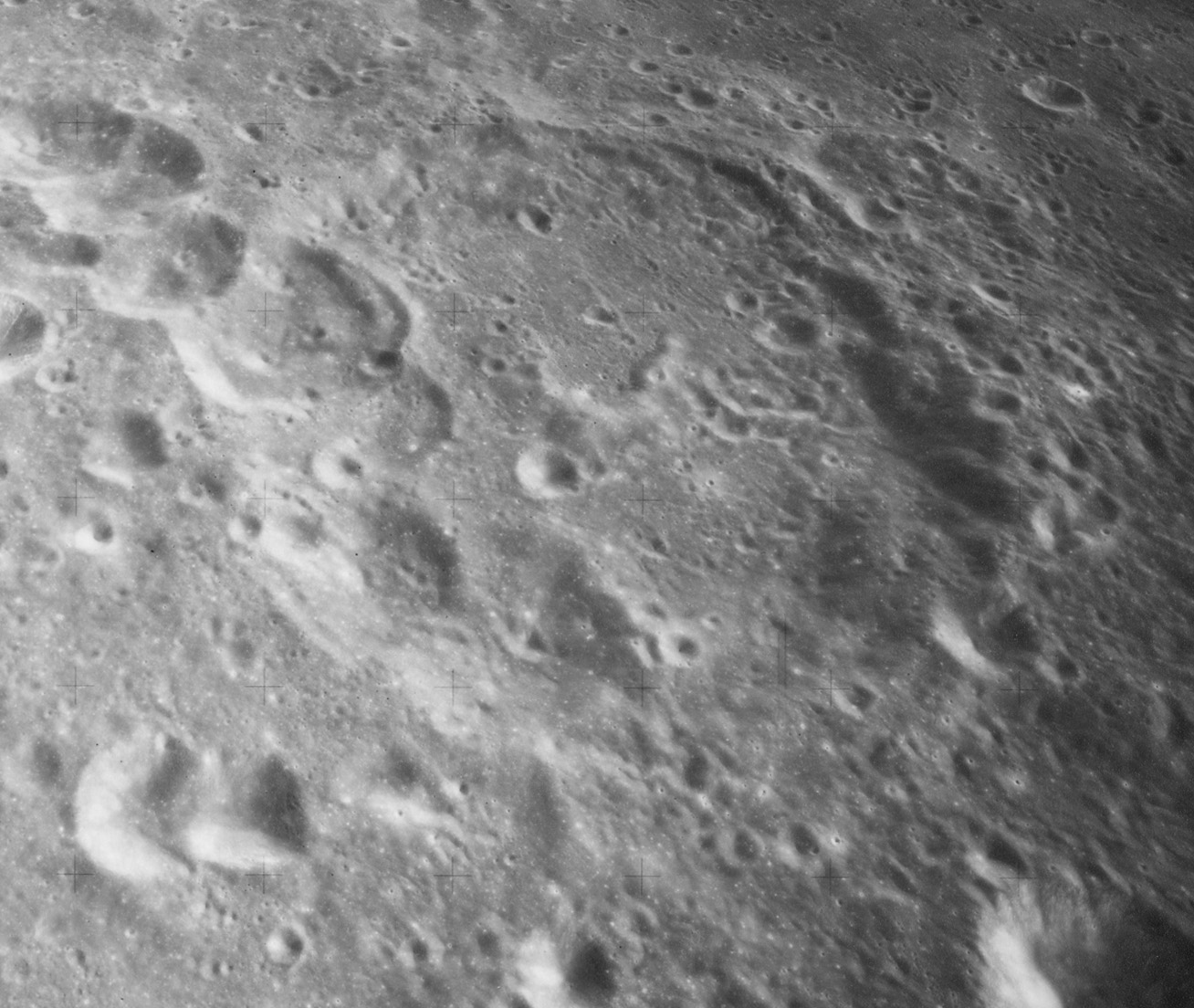
Oblique Apollo 15 Mapping Camera image

Lamé is a lunar impact crater located astride the northeast rim of the crater Langrenus, to the east of Mare Fecunditatis. The eastern crater rim appears overlaid by a series of overlapping craters that form an intermittent chain flowing nearly a hundred kilometers to the south. The crater rim protrudes only slightly above the surrounding terrain, but it has a significant rampart where the rim lies within Vendelinus. In the middle of the floor is a slight ridge, forming a central peak.

This crater is named after French mathematician Gabriel Lamé (1795–1870). On some older maps this crater was called Smith. It was previously designated Vendelinus C before being renamed by the IAU.

== Satellite craters ==
By convention these features are identified on lunar maps by placing the letter on the side of the crater midpoint that is closest to Lamé.

Lamé	Latitude	Longitude	Diameter
E	13.9° S	66.8° E	11 km
F	13.9° S	66.4° E	18 km
G	15.4° S	65.5° E	26 km
H	15.8° S	68.2° E	12 km
J	14.3° S	65.7° E	18 km
K	13.3° S	64.2° E	8 km
L	14.4° S	68.6° E	6 km
M	15.8° S	66.5° E	13 km
N	12.8° S	67.1° E	9 km
T	12.5° S	66.5° E	11 km
W	13.1° S	65.9° E	6 km
Z	15.9° S	65.9° E	17 km
