= Charles Atwood =

Charles Atwood or Attwood may refer to:

- Charles B. Atwood (1849–1896), architect in the city of Chicago
- Charles Attwood (1791–1875), English industrialist and politician, founder of the Weardale Iron and Coal Company
- Charles R. Attwood (1932–1998), American pediatrician

== See also ==
- Charles Atwood Kofoid (1865–1947), American zoologist
