= Naonobu (crater) =

Crater on the Moon

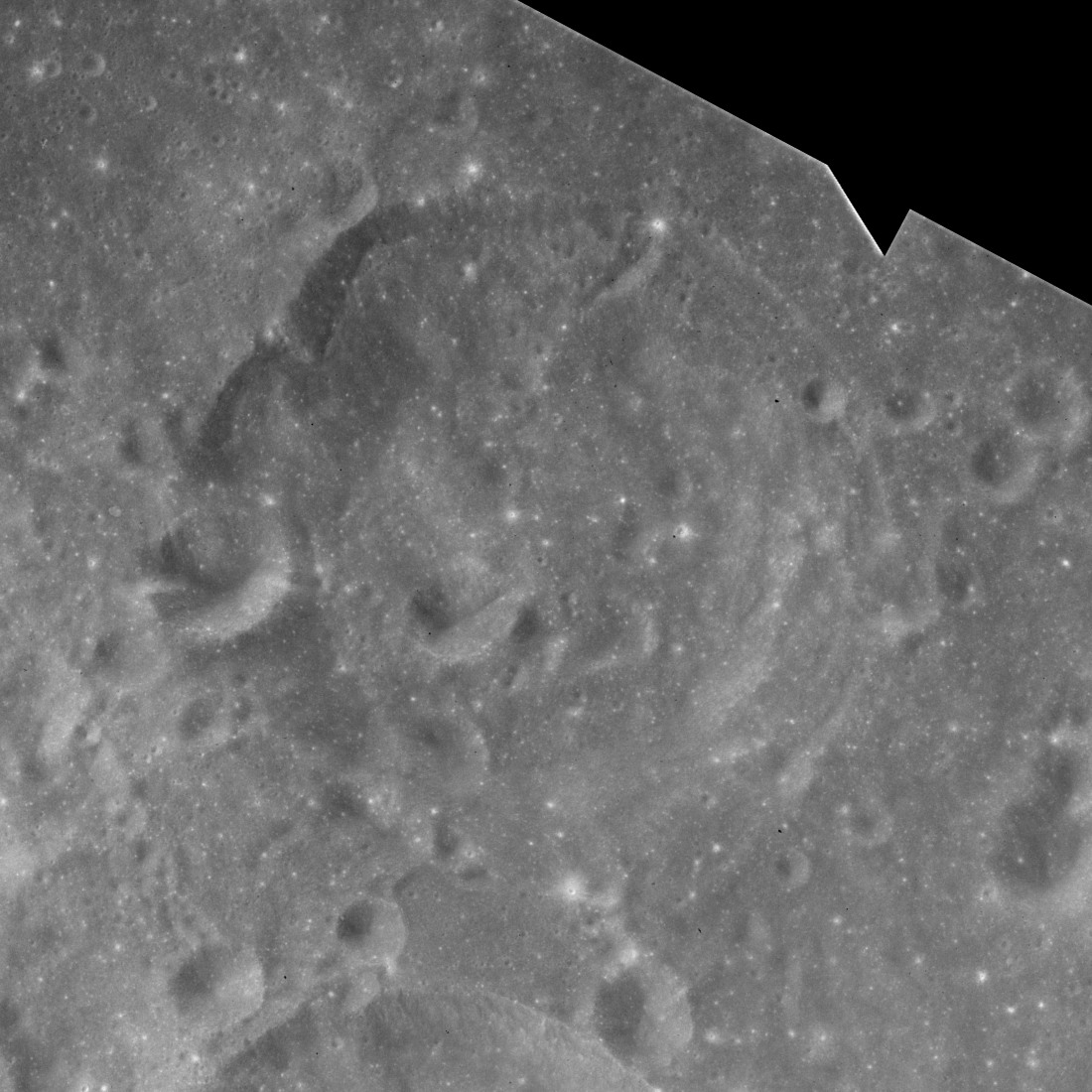
- Apollo 15 image
- Coordinates: 4.70°S 57.93°E
- Diameter: 32.96 km (20.48 mi)
- Depth: Unknown
- Colongitude: 302° at sunrise
- Eponym: Naonobu Ajima

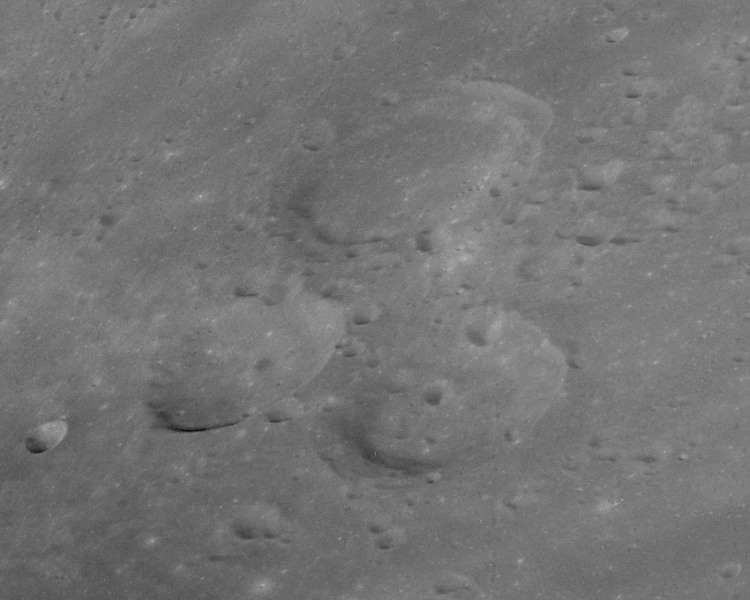
Oblique view of Bilharz (top), Atwood (lower left), and Naonobu (lower right), from Apollo 11

Naonobu is a small lunar impact crater named after Japanese mathematician Ajima Naonobu. It is located on the eastern Mare Fecunditatis, to the northwest of the prominent crater Langrenus, and it forms a triple-crater formation with the adjacent Atwood to the south and Bilharz just to the southwest. Naonobu and Atwood are separated by only a few kilometres.

The interior of this crater has been flooded with basaltic lava, leaving a relatively flat interior and a reduced outer rim. There is no central peak, but a small crater lies just to the southwest of the midpoint. A similar crater lies across the western interior of the rim.

This crater was previously designated Langrenus B before being renamed by the IAU in 1976.
