= Atwood machine =

Classroom demonstration used to illustrate principles of classical mechanics

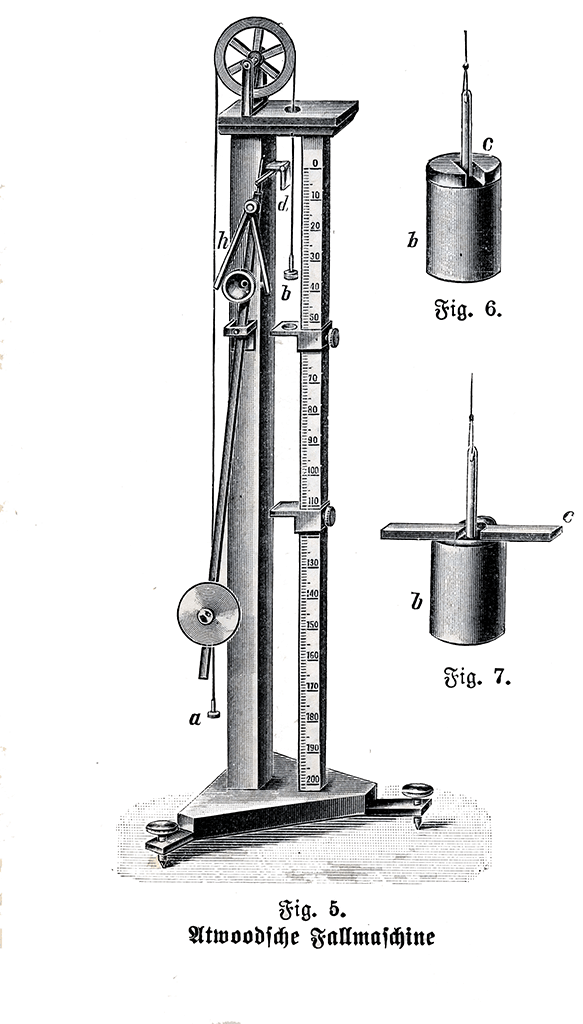
Illustration of the Atwood machine, 1905.

The Atwood machine (or Atwood's machine) was invented in 1784 by the English mathematician George Atwood as a laboratory experiment to verify the mechanical laws of motion with constant acceleration. Atwood's machine is a common classroom demonstration used to illustrate principles of classical mechanics.

The ideal Atwood machine consists of two objects of mass m_{1} and m_{2}, connected by an inextensible massless string over an ideal massless pulley.

Both masses experience uniform acceleration. When m_{1} = m_{2}, the machine is in neutral equilibrium regardless of the position of the weights.

== Equation for constant acceleration ==
The free body diagrams of the two hanging masses of the Atwood machine. Our sign convention, depicted by the acceleration vectors is that m_{1} accelerates downward and that m_{2} accelerates upward, as would be the case if m_{1} > m_{2}

An equation for the acceleration can be derived by analyzing forces. Assuming a massless, inextensible string and an ideal massless pulley, the only forces to consider are: tension force (T), and the weight of the two masses (W_{1} and W_{2}). To find an acceleration, consider the forces affecting each individual mass. Using Newton's second law (with a sign convention of $m_1 > m_2$) derive a system of equations for the acceleration (a).

As a sign convention, assume that a is positive when downward for $m_1$ and upward for $m_2$. Weight of $m_1$ and $m_2$ is simply $W_1 = m_1 g$ and $W_2 = m_2 g$ respectively.

Forces affecting m_{1}:
$$m_1 g - T = m_1 a$$
Forces affecting m_{2}:
$$T - m_2 g = m_2 a$$
and adding the two previous equations yields
$$m_1 g - m_2 g = m_1 a + m_2 a,$$
and the concluding formula for acceleration
$$a = g \frac{m_1 - m_2}{m_1 + m_2}$$

The Atwood machine is sometimes used to illustrate the Lagrangian method of deriving equations of motion.

== See also ==
- Frictionless plane
- Kater's pendulum – Reversible free swinging pendulum
- Spherical cow – Humorous concept in scientific models
- Swinging Atwood's machine – Variation of Atwood's machine incorporating a pendulum
