= Abu Ali al-Hasan al-Marrakushi =

Moroccan astronomer and mathematician

Abu Ali al-Hassan al-Marrakushi
- الحسن المراكشي
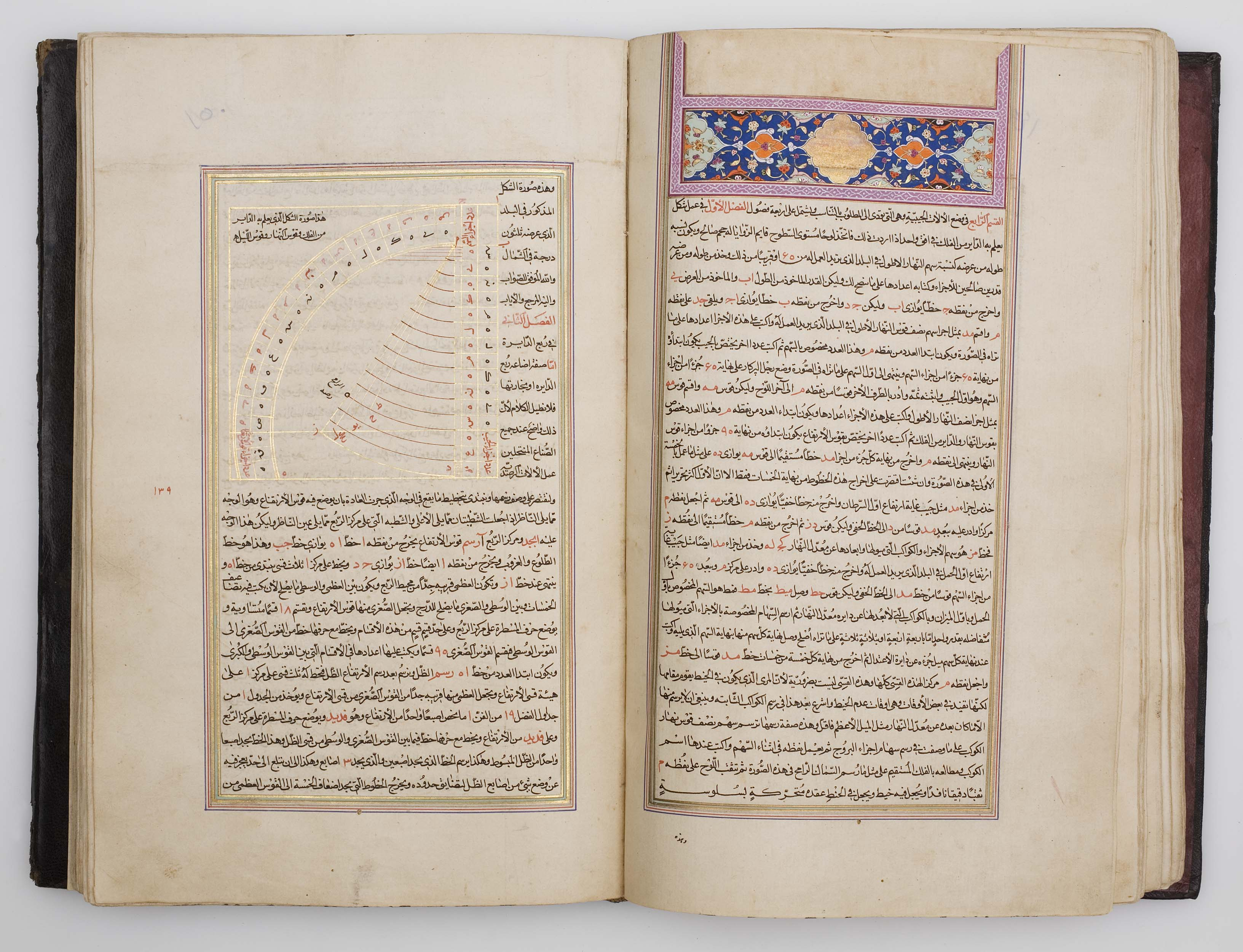
- The Jami‘ al-Mabadi’ wa’l-Ghayat, (Khalili Collection of Islamic Art)
- Born: fl. late 13th century

Academic work
- Era: Islamic Golden Age
- Main interests: Mathematics, astronomy
- Notable works: Jāmiʿ al-mabādiʾ wa’l-ghāyāt fī ʿilm al-mīqāt (Collection of the Principles and Objectives in the Science of Timekeeping)

Abu Ali al-Hassan al-Marrakushi (Arabic: الحسن المراكشي; late 13th century) was a Maghreb astronomer and mathematician from the Kingdom of Morocco . He was especially important in the field of trigonometry and practical astronomy. He wrote Jāmiʿ al-mabādiʾ wa’l-ghāyāt fī ʿilm al-mīqāt (Collection of the Principles and Objectives in the Science of Timekeeping), a treatise on spherical astronomy and astronomical instruments. The first part was translated into French by the orientalist and astronomer Jean Jacques Emmanuel Sédillot during the early 19th century, and published after Sédillot's death.

The treatise, which was written in Cairo between 1276 and 1282, is regarded as the most complete source to have survived about medieval Islamic astronomical instruments.

== Legacy ==
The crater Al-Marrakushi on the Moon is named after him.

== Sources ==
- Charette, François (2007). "Marrākushī: Sharaf al‐Dīn Abū ʿAlī al‐Ḥasan ibn ʿAlī ibn ʿUmar al‐Marrākushī". In Thomas Hockey; et al. (eds.). The Biographical Encyclopedia of Astronomers. New York: Springer. ISBN 978-0-387-31022-0.
- Hernández Pérez, Azucena (2021). "Art and Science in al-Andalus in the Late Medieval Mediterranean Cultures: Almohad, Nasrid and Ayyubid Astrolabes and their Contexts". In Marcos Cobaleda, María (ed.). Artistic and Cultural Dialogues in the Late Medieval Mediterranean. Springer Nature. pp. 239–251. doi:10.1007/978-3-030-53366-3. ISBN 978-3-030-53366-3.
- Rogers, J. M. (2008). The Arts of Islam: Treasures from the Nasser D. Khalili Collection (Revised and expanded ed.). Abu Dhabi: Tourism Development & Investment Company (TDIC). OCLC 455121277.
- Sédillot, Louis‐Amélie (1841). Mémoire sur les Instruments Astronomiques des Arabes. Paris: Imprimerie Royale – via Internet Archive.
