= Brett Atwood =

Website editor/content strategist/former print/online journalist

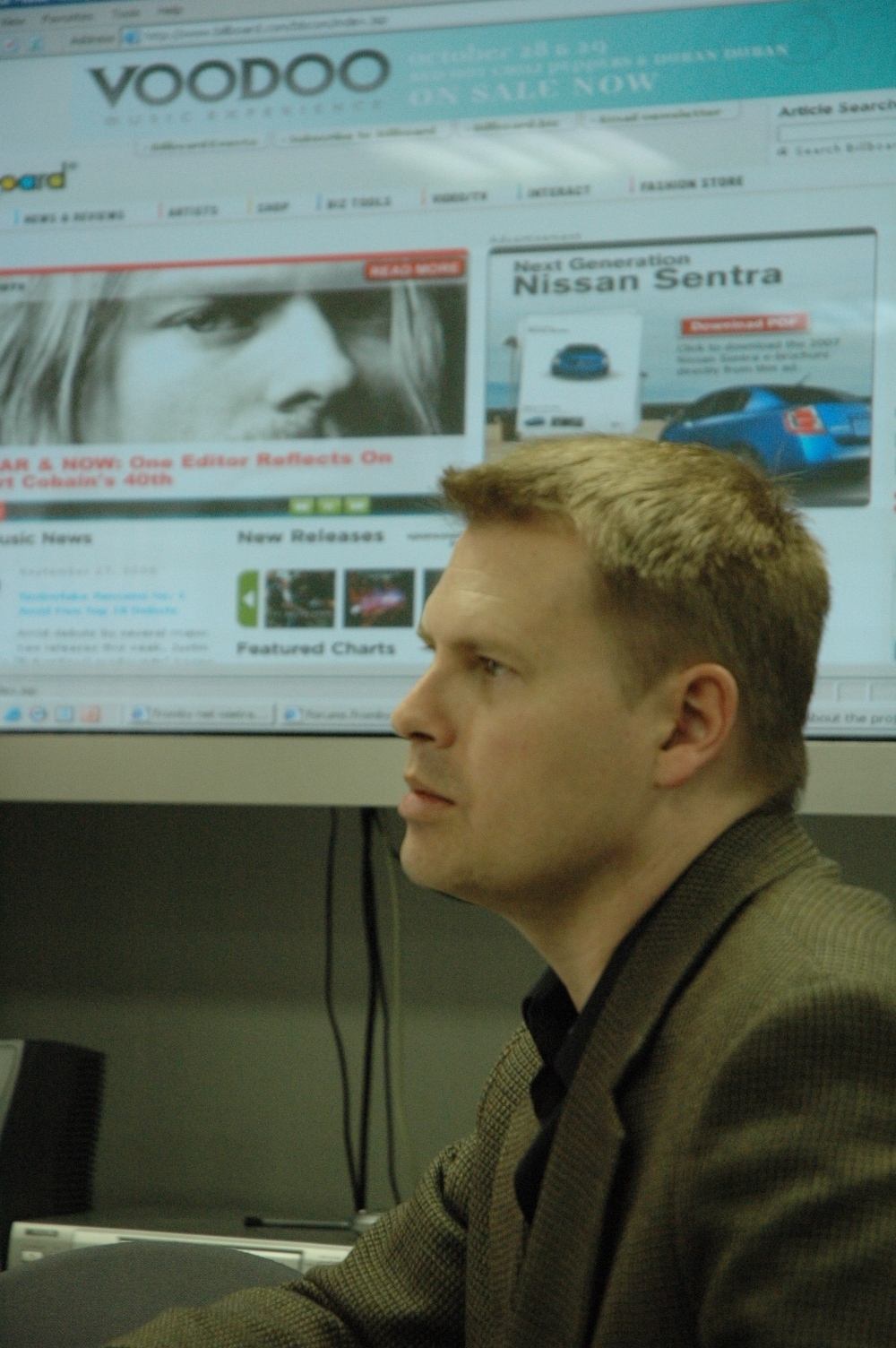
- Born: USA
- Occupation(s): Journalist, Academic
- Notable credit(s): Internet content strategist (Linden Lab, Amazon.com, RealNetworks)

Brett Atwood is a website editor, content strategist and former print and online journalist whose writings have appeared in Billboard, Rolling Stone, Vibe, The Hollywood Reporter and other publications. Atwood has held managing editor positions at leading Internet sites Amazon.com, Second Life and RealNetworks. In 2001, Atwood's career shifted to include academia, where he teaches at the Edward R. Murrow College of Communication at Washington State University. He holds an M.A. degree in communication from University of the Pacific in Stockton, California.

== Journalism ==
During his five-year stint as new media editor at Billboard, he was among the first reporters to document the development of Internet-based digital downloading and streaming media technologies. His expertise in this area has resulted in numerous analyst and commentator appearances at several national print and TV outlets, including Fox News, MSNBC, CNN, CBS Evening News, USA Today and The Wall Street Journal.

== Online ==
At Amazon.com, he managed and developed editorial content for several of the e-commerce site’s operations, including the debut of the Computer & Video Games, Electronics and Toys stores. At RealNetworks, he managed content development for various music properties at the streaming media company, including MusicNet, LiveConcerts.com and RealGuide Music. In addition, he co-founded Internet music service Rolling Stone Radio with Rolling Stone magazine. At Linden Lab, he works on editorial and content strategy for multiple products including the Internet-based 3D digital world Second Life and the social VR platform Sansar.

== Academia ==
Atwood teaches courses in digital content production, reporting and social media persuasion at the Edward R. Murrow College of Communication at Washington State University.

In 2006, he was the recipient of a U.S. Speaker and Specialist Grant from the U.S. Department of State. This grant enabled Atwood to travel to Minsk, Belarus to conduct workshops on Internet content development among independent journalists. Under the regime of Alexander Lukashenko, the government has all but suffocated traditional distribution outlets for independent journalists due to its intolerance of dissenting viewpoints.

In 2008, he received a grant from the McCormick Foundation to conduct a Virtual Journalism Summit featuring workshops and presentations about reporting within 3D spaces. The effort comes as a result of the growing popularity and influence of virtual reality worlds, where there are many real stories unfolding within the "metaverse" and its newly created 3D spaces. For example, real-world news organizations, such as CNN and Sky News, once held "in-world" virtual news bureaus that aimed to document and report on the virtual economy and activities within Second Life.

In 2010, he worked with the McCormick Foundation again to create the Murrow Center 3D Newsroom. This virtual world project features 3D "citizen journalism" training kiosks and a multimedia exhibit dedicated to famed broadcast journalist Edward R. Murrow.

In 2011, he was a co-recipient of a U.S. Department of State grant for the Study of the United States Institute for Student Leaders on New Media in Journalism (SUSI).
