= William Atwood (disambiguation) =

William Atwood may refer to:

- Bill Atwood (1911–1993), American baseball player
- Bill Atwood (bishop), American bishop
- Bill Atwood (musician), American musician
- William Atwood (c. 1650–1712), English lawyer
- William A. Atwood (1835–1908), American politician
- William Q. Atwood (1839–1910), American businessman
- William H. Atwood (1845 1909), American civil engineer

== See also ==
- William Attwood (1919–1989), American journalist and diplomat
- William Attwood (mayor) (died 1754), colonial mayor of Philadelphia
