= Bilharz (crater) =

Crater on the Moon

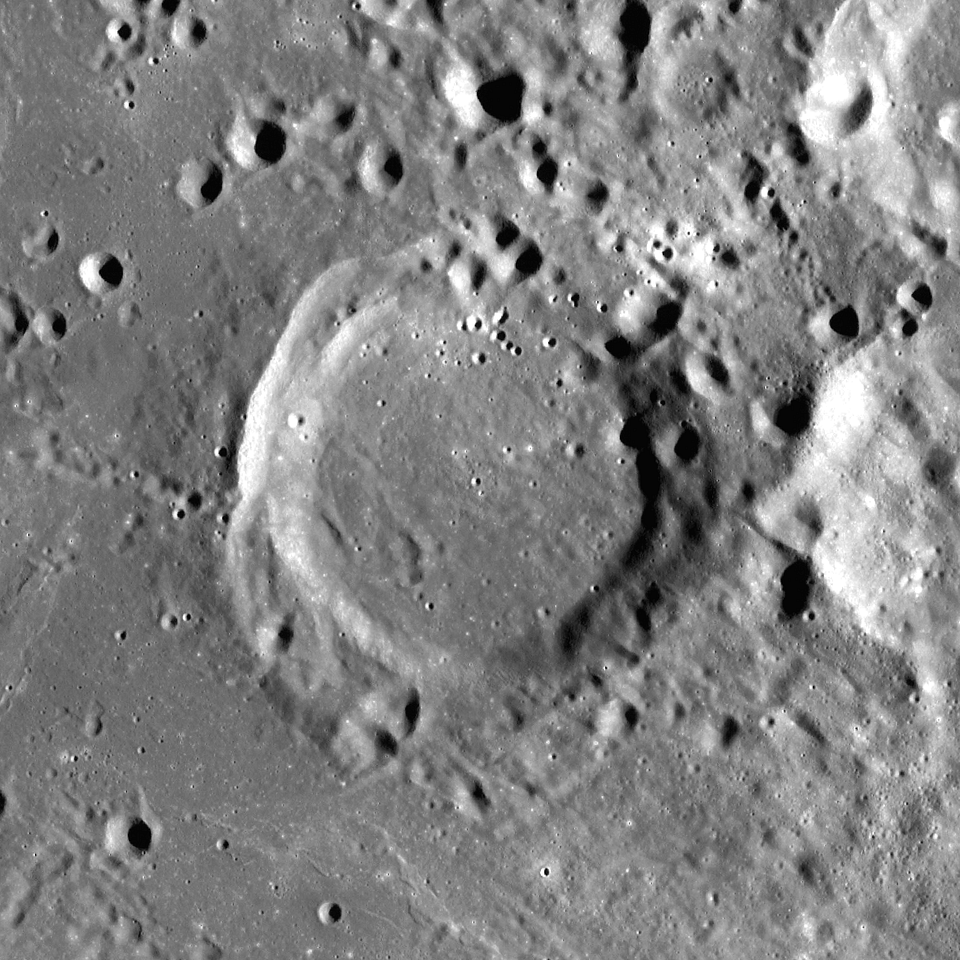
- Lunar Reconnaissance Orbiter image
- Coordinates: 5.83°S 56.34°E
- Diameter: 44.55 km (27.68 mi)
- Depth: 2.1 km
- Colongitude: 304° at sunrise
- Eponym: Theodore M. Bilharz

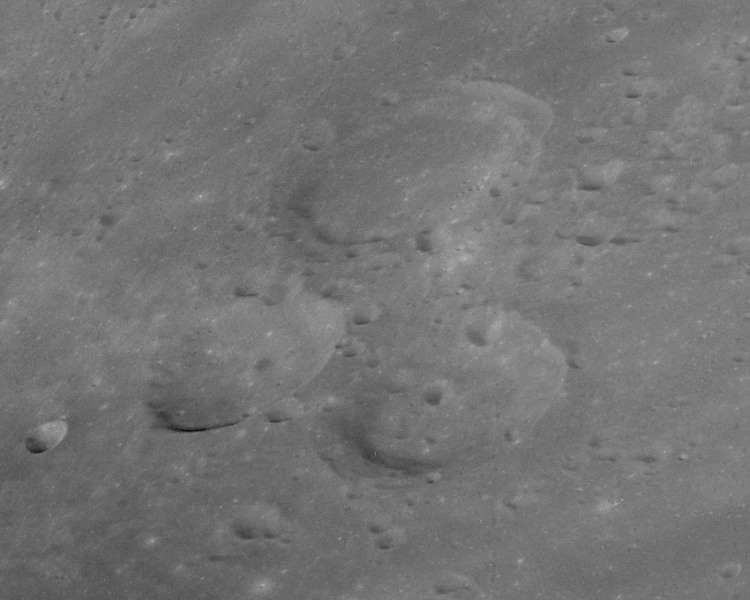
Oblique view of Bilharz (top), Atwood (lower left), and Naonobu (lower right), from Apollo 11

Bilharz is a lunar impact crater that lies in the eastern part of the Mare Fecunditatis. It is the largest member of a close triple-crater formation with Atwood to the east and Naonobu to the northeast. To the southeast is the crater Langrenus.

The interior of this crater has been resurfaced by basaltic lava, leaving the floor flat, shallow, and nearly featureless with just a few very small sub-craters. There is no central peak at the midpoint. The outer rim remains circular and only slightly worn.

This crater is named after German doctor and zoologist Theodore M. Bilharz (1825-1862). Prior to being named by the International Astronomical Union in 1976, this crater was identified as Langrenus F.
