= Swinging Atwood's machine =

Variation of Atwood's machine incorporating a pendulum

The Swinging Atwood's machine. The smaller mass, labelled m, is allowed to swing freely whereas the larger mass, M, can only move up and down. Assume the pivots to be points.

The swinging Atwood's machine (SAM) is a mechanism that resembles a simple Atwood's machine except that one of the masses is allowed to swing in a two-dimensional plane, producing a dynamical system that is chaotic for some system parameters and initial conditions.

Specifically, it comprises two masses (the pendulum, mass m and counterweight, mass M) connected by an inextensible, massless string suspended on two frictionless pulleys of zero radius such that the pendulum can swing freely around its pulley without colliding with the counterweight.

The conventional Atwood's machine allows only "runaway" solutions (i.e. either the pendulum or counterweight eventually collides with its pulley), except for $M=m$. However, the swinging Atwood's machine with $M>m$ has a large parameter space of conditions that lead to a variety of motions that can be classified as terminating or non-terminating, periodic, quasiperiodic or chaotic, bounded or unbounded, singular or non-singular due to the pendulum's reactive centrifugal force counteracting the counterweight's weight. Research on the SAM started as part of the 1982 senior thesis Smiles and Teardrops (referring to the shape of some trajectories of the system) by Nicholas Tufillaro at Reed College, directed by David J. Griffiths.

== Equations of motion ==
Motion of Swinging Atwood's Machine for M/m = 4.5

The swinging Atwood's machine is a system with two degrees of freedom. One may derive its equations of motion using either Hamiltonian mechanics or Lagrangian mechanics. Let the swinging mass be $m$ and the non-swinging mass be $M$. The kinetic energy of the system, $T$, is:

$$\begin{align}
T &= \frac{1}{2} M v^2_M + \frac{1}{2} mv^2_m \\
&= \frac{1}{2}M \dot{r}^2+\frac{1}{2} m \left(\dot{r}^2+r^2\dot{\theta}^2\right)
\end{align}$$

where $r$ is the distance of the swinging mass to its pivot, and $\theta$ is the angle of the swinging mass relative to pointing straight downwards. The potential energy $U$ is solely due to the acceleration due to gravity:

$$\begin{align}
U &= Mgr - mgr \cos{\theta}
\end{align}$$

We may then write down the Lagrangian, $\mathcal{L}$, and the Hamiltonian, $\mathcal{H}$ of the system:

$$\begin{align}
\mathcal{L} &= T-U\\
&= \frac{1}{2}M \dot{r}^2+\frac{1}{2} m \left(\dot{r}^2+r^2\dot{\theta}^2\right) - Mgr + mgr \cos{\theta}\\
\mathcal{H} &= T+U\\
&= \frac{1}{2}M \dot{r}^2+\frac{1}{2} m \left(\dot{r}^2+r^2\dot{\theta}^2\right) + Mgr - mgr \cos{\theta}
\end{align}$$

We can then express the Hamiltonian in terms of the canonical momenta, $p_r$, $p_\theta$:

$$\begin{align}
p_r &= \frac{\partial{\mathcal{L}}}{\partial \dot{r}} = \frac{\partial T}{\partial \dot{r}} = (M+m)\dot{r}\\
p_\theta &= \frac{\partial {\mathcal{L}}}{\partial \dot{\theta}} = \frac{\partial T}{\partial \dot{\theta}} = mr^2 \dot{\theta}\\
\therefore \mathcal{H} &= \frac{p_r^2}{2(M+m)} + \frac{p_\theta^2}{2mr^2} + Mgr - mgr \cos{\theta}
\end{align}$$

Lagrange analysis can be applied to obtain two second-order coupled ordinary differential equations in $r$ and $\theta$. First, the $\theta$ equation:

$$\begin{align}
\frac{\partial {\mathcal{L}}}{\partial \theta} &= \frac{d}{dt} \left(\frac{\partial {\mathcal{L}}}{\partial \dot{\theta}}\right)\\
-mgr \sin{\theta} &= 2mr \dot{r}\dot{\theta} + mr^2 \ddot{\theta}\\
r\ddot{\theta} + 2\dot{r}\dot{\theta} + g\sin{\theta} &= 0
\end{align}$$

And the $r$ equation:

$$\begin{align}
\frac{\partial {\mathcal{L}}}{\partial r} &= \frac{d}{dt} \left( \frac{\partial \mathcal{L}}{\partial \dot{r}}\right)\\
mr\dot{\theta}^2 - Mg + mg\cos{\theta} &= (M+m) \ddot{r}
\end{align}$$

We simplify the equations by defining the mass ratio $\mu = \frac{M}{m}$. The above then becomes:

$$(\mu+1)\ddot{r} - r\dot{\theta}^2 + g(\mu - \cos{\theta}) = 0$$

Hamiltonian analysis may also be applied to determine four first order ODEs in terms of $r$, $\theta$ and their corresponding canonical momenta $p_r$ and $p_\theta$:

$$\begin{align}
\dot{r}&=\frac {\partial{\mathcal{H}}} {\partial{p_r}} = \frac {p_r}{M+m} \\
\dot{p_r} &= - \frac {\partial{\mathcal{H}}} {\partial{r}} = \frac {p_\theta ^2}  {mr^3}  - Mg + mg\cos{\theta} \\
\dot{\theta}&=\frac {\partial{\mathcal{H}}} {\partial{p_\theta}} = \frac {p_\theta} {mr^2} \\
\dot{p_\theta} &= - \frac {\partial{\mathcal{H}}} {\partial{\theta}} = -mgr\sin{\theta}
\end{align}$$

Notice that in both of these derivations, if one sets $\theta$ and angular velocity $\dot{\theta}$ to zero, the resulting special case is the regular non-swinging Atwood machine:

$$\ddot{r} = g \frac{1-\mu}{1+\mu}=g\frac{m-M}{m+M}$$

The swinging Atwood's machine has a four-dimensional phase space defined by $r$, $\theta$ and their corresponding canonical momenta $p_r$ and $p_\theta$. However, due to energy conservation, the phase space is constrained to three dimensions.

=== System with massive pulleys ===
If the pulleys in the system are taken to have moment of inertia $I$ and radius $R$, the Hamiltonian of the SAM is then:

$$\mathcal{H}\left(r, \theta, \dot{r}, \dot{\theta} \right) =
\underbrace{ \frac{1}{2} M_t \left( R \dot{\theta} - \dot{r} \right) ^2
+ \frac{1}{2} m r^2 \dot{\theta}^2 }_{T}
+ \underbrace{ gr \left(M - m \cos{\theta} \right)
+ gR \left( m \sin{\theta} - M \theta \right)}_{U},$$

Where M_{t} is the effective total mass of the system,

$$M_t = M + m + \frac{I}{R^2}$$

This reduces to the version above when $R$ and $I$ become zero. The equations of motion are now:

$$\begin{align}
\mu_t ( \ddot{r} - R \ddot{\theta}) & = r \dot{\theta}^2 + g (\cos {\theta} - \mu ) \\
r \ddot{\theta}    & = - 2 \dot{r} \dot{\theta} + R \dot{\theta}^2 - g \sin {\theta} \\
\end{align}$$

where $\mu_t = M_t / m$.

=== Integrability ===
Hamiltonian systems can be classified as integrable and nonintegrable. SAM is integrable when the mass ratio $\mu = M/m = 3$. The system also looks pretty regular for $\mu = 4 n^2 - 1 = 3, 15, 35, ...$, but the $\mu = 3$ case is the only known integrable mass ratio. It has been shown that the system is not integrable for $\mu \in (0,1) \cup (3,\infty)$. For many other values of the mass ratio (and initial conditions) SAM displays chaotic motion.

Numerical studies indicate that when the orbit is singular (initial conditions: $r=0, \dot{r}=v, \theta=\theta_0, \dot{\theta}=0$), the pendulum executes a single symmetrical loop and returns to the origin, regardless of the value of $\theta_0$. When $\theta_0$ is small (near vertical), the trajectory describes a "teardrop", when it is large, it describes a "heart". These trajectories can be exactly solved algebraically, which is unusual for a system with a non-linear Hamiltonian.

== Trajectories ==
The swinging mass of the swinging Atwood's machine undergoes interesting trajectories or orbits when subject to different initial conditions, and for different mass ratios. These include periodic orbits and collision orbits.

=== Nonsingular orbits ===
For certain conditions, system exhibits complex harmonic motion. The orbit is called nonsingular if the swinging mass does not touch the pulley.

Selection of nonsingular orbits
An orbit of the swinging Atwood's machine for $\mu=2$, $\theta_0=\frac{\pi}{2}$, and zero initial velocity.

An orbit of the swinging Atwood's machine for $\mu=3$, $\theta_0=\frac{\pi}{2}$, and zero initial velocity.

An orbit of the swinging Atwood's machine for $\mu=5$, $\theta_0=\frac{\pi}{2}$, and zero initial velocity.

An orbit of the swinging Atwood's machine for $\mu=6$, $\theta_0=\frac{\pi}{2}$, and zero initial velocity.

An orbit of the swinging Atwood's machine for $\mu=16$, $\theta_0=\frac{\pi}{2}$, and zero initial velocity.

An orbit of the swinging Atwood's machine for $\mu=19$, $\theta_0=\frac{\pi}{2}$, and zero initial velocity.

An orbit of the swinging Atwood's machine for $\mu=21$, $\theta_0=\frac{\pi}{2}$, and zero initial velocity.

An orbit of the swinging Atwood's machine for $\mu=24$, $\theta_0=\frac{\pi}{2}$, and zero initial velocity.

==== Periodic orbits ====
Type A orbits for $\theta_0$ ranging from 0.1 to 3.1.

When the different harmonic components in the system are in phase, the resulting trajectory is simple and periodic, such as the "smile" trajectory, which resembles that of an ordinary pendulum, and various loops. In general a periodic orbit exists when the following is satisfied:

$$r(t+\tau) = r(t),\, \theta(t+\tau) = \theta(t)$$

The simplest case of periodic orbits is the "smile" orbit, which Tufillaro termed Type A orbits in his 1984 paper.

Selection of periodic orbits
A "smile" orbit of the swinging Atwood's machine for $\mu=1.665$, $\theta_0=\frac{\pi}{2}$, and zero initial velocity.

An orbit of the swinging Atwood's machine for $\mu=2.394$, $\theta_0=\frac{\pi}{2}$, and zero initial velocity.

An orbit of the swinging Atwood's machine for $\mu=1.1727$, $\theta_0=\frac{\pi}{2}$, and zero initial velocity.

An orbit of the swinging Atwood's machine for $\mu=1.555$, $\theta_0=\frac{\pi}{2}$, and zero initial velocity.

=== Singular orbits ===
The motion is singular if at some point, the swinging mass passes through the origin. Since the system is invariant under time reversal and translation, it is equivalent to say that the pendulum starts at the origin and is fired outwards:

$$r(0) = 0$$

The region close to the pivot is singular, since $r$ is close to zero and the equations of motion require dividing by $r$. As such, special techniques must be used to rigorously analyze these cases.

The following are plots of arbitrarily selected singular orbits.

Selection of singular orbits
An orbit of the swinging Atwood's machine for $\mu=10$, $\theta_0=\frac{\pi}{2}$, and zero initial velocity.

An orbit of the swinging Atwood's machine for $\mu=25$, $\theta_0=\frac{\pi}{2}$, and zero initial velocity.

==== Collision orbits ====
Type B orbits for $\theta_0$ ranging from 0.1 to 3.1.

Collision (or terminating singular) orbits are subset of singular orbits formed when the swinging mass is ejected from its pivot with an initial velocity, such that it returns to the pivot (i.e. it collides with the pivot):

$$r(\tau) = r(0) = 0, \, \tau > 0$$

The simplest case of collision orbits are the ones with a mass ratio of 3, which will always return symmetrically to the origin after being ejected from the origin, and were termed Type B orbits in Tufillaro's initial paper. They were also referred to as teardrop, heart, or rabbit-ear orbits because of their appearance.

When the swinging mass returns to the origin, the counterweight mass, $M$ must instantaneously change direction, causing an infinite tension in the connecting string. Thus we may consider the motion to terminate at this time.

== Boundedness ==
For any initial position, it can be shown that the swinging mass is bounded by a curve that is a conic section. The pivot is always a focus of this bounding curve. The equation for this curve can be derived by analyzing the energy of the system, and using conservation of energy. Let us suppose that $m$ is released from rest at $r=r_0$ and $\theta=\theta_0$. The total energy of the system is therefore:

$$E = \frac{1}{2}M \dot{r}^2+\frac{1}{2} m \left(\dot{r}^2+r^2\dot{\theta}^2\right) + Mgr - mgr \cos{\theta} = Mgr_0 - mgr_0 \cos{\theta_0}$$

However, notice that in the boundary case, the velocity of the swinging mass is zero. Hence we have:

$$Mgr - mgr \cos{\theta}=Mgr_0 - mgr_0 \cos{\theta_0}$$

To see that it is the equation of a conic section, we isolate for $r$:

$$\begin{align}
r&=\frac{h}{1-\frac{\cos{\theta}}{\mu}}\\
h&=r_0\left(1-\frac{\cos{\theta_0}}{\mu}\right)
\end{align}$$

Note that the numerator is a constant dependent only on the initial position in this case, as we have assumed the initial condition to be at rest. However, the energy constant $h$ can also be calculated for nonzero initial velocity, and the equation still holds in all cases. The eccentricity of the conic section is $\frac{1}{\mu}$. For $\mu>1$, this is an ellipse, and the system is bounded and the swinging mass always stays within the ellipse. For $\mu=1$, it is a parabola and for $\mu<1$ it is a hyperbola; in either of these cases, it is not bounded. As $\mu$ gets arbitrarily large, the bounding curve approaches a circle. The region enclosed by the curve is known as the Hill's region.

== Recent three dimensional extension ==
A new integrable case for the problem of three dimensional Swinging Atwood Machine (3D-SAM) was announced in 2016. Like the 2D version, the problem is integrable when $M = 3m$.
