= Langrenus (crater) =

Crater on the Moon

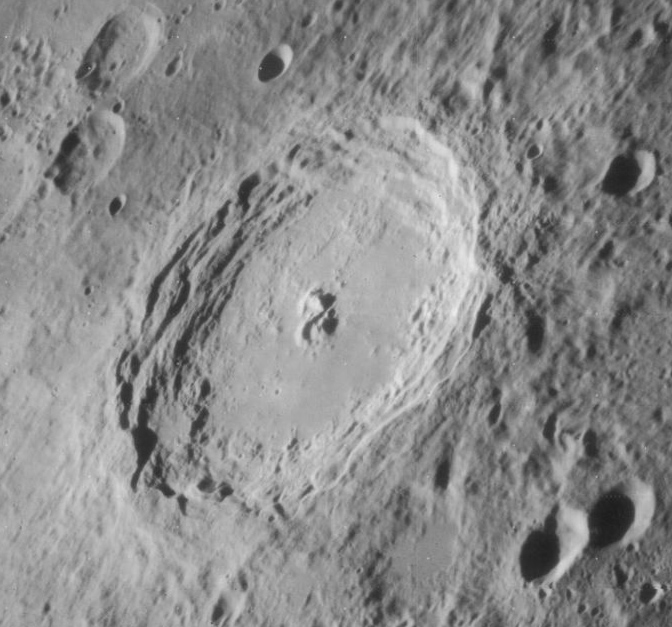
- Oblique Lunar Orbiter 4 image
- Coordinates: 8.86°S 61.04°E
- Diameter: 131.98 km (82.01 mi)
- Depth: 4.5 km
- Colongitude: 300° at sunrise
- Formation: Eratosthenian
- Eponym: Michel F. van Langren

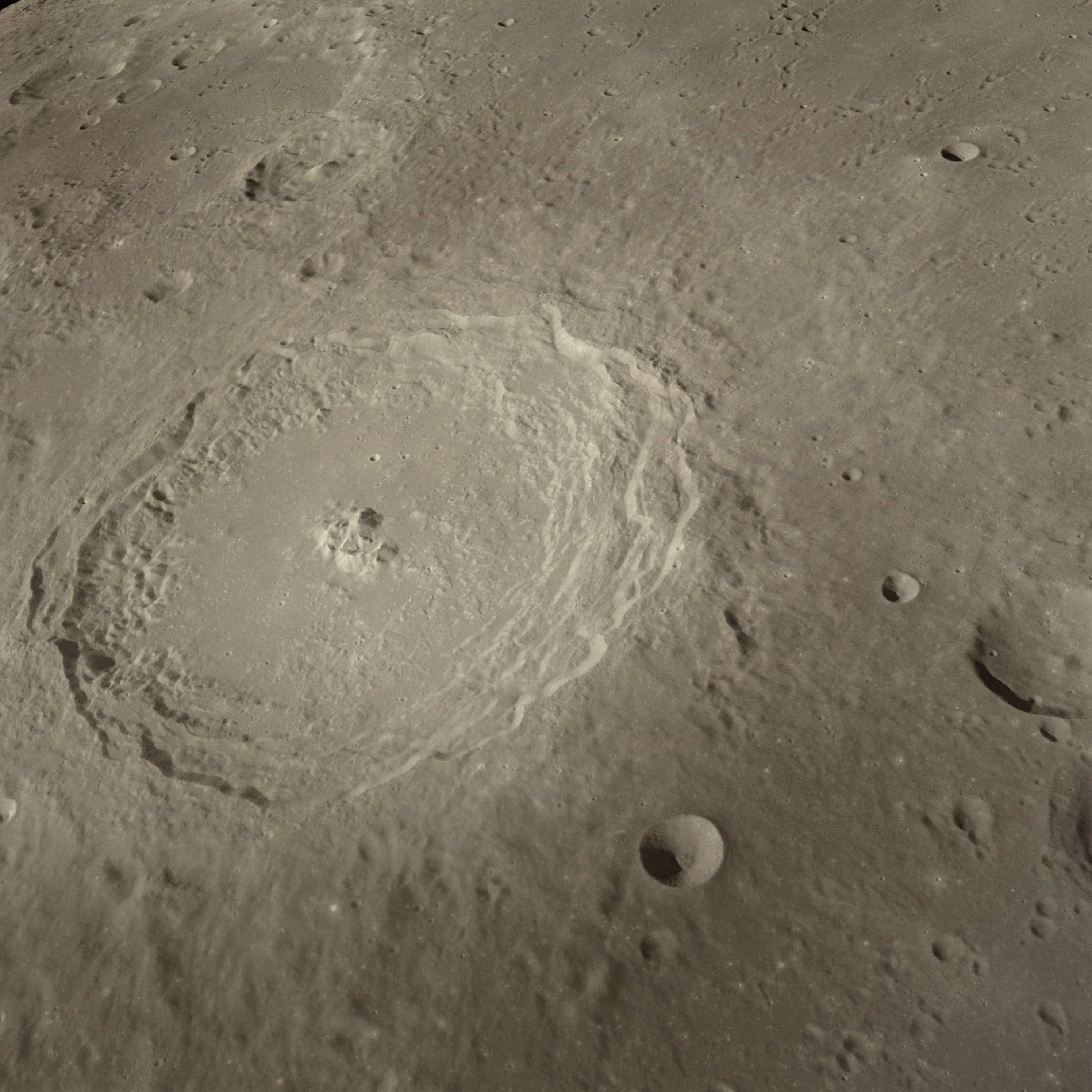
This view is from Apollo 8, the first crewed mission to the Moon. During the mission, astronaut James Lovell described Langrenus as "quite a huge crater; it's got a central cone to it. The walls of the crater are terraced, about six or seven terraces on the way down."

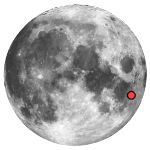
Crater location

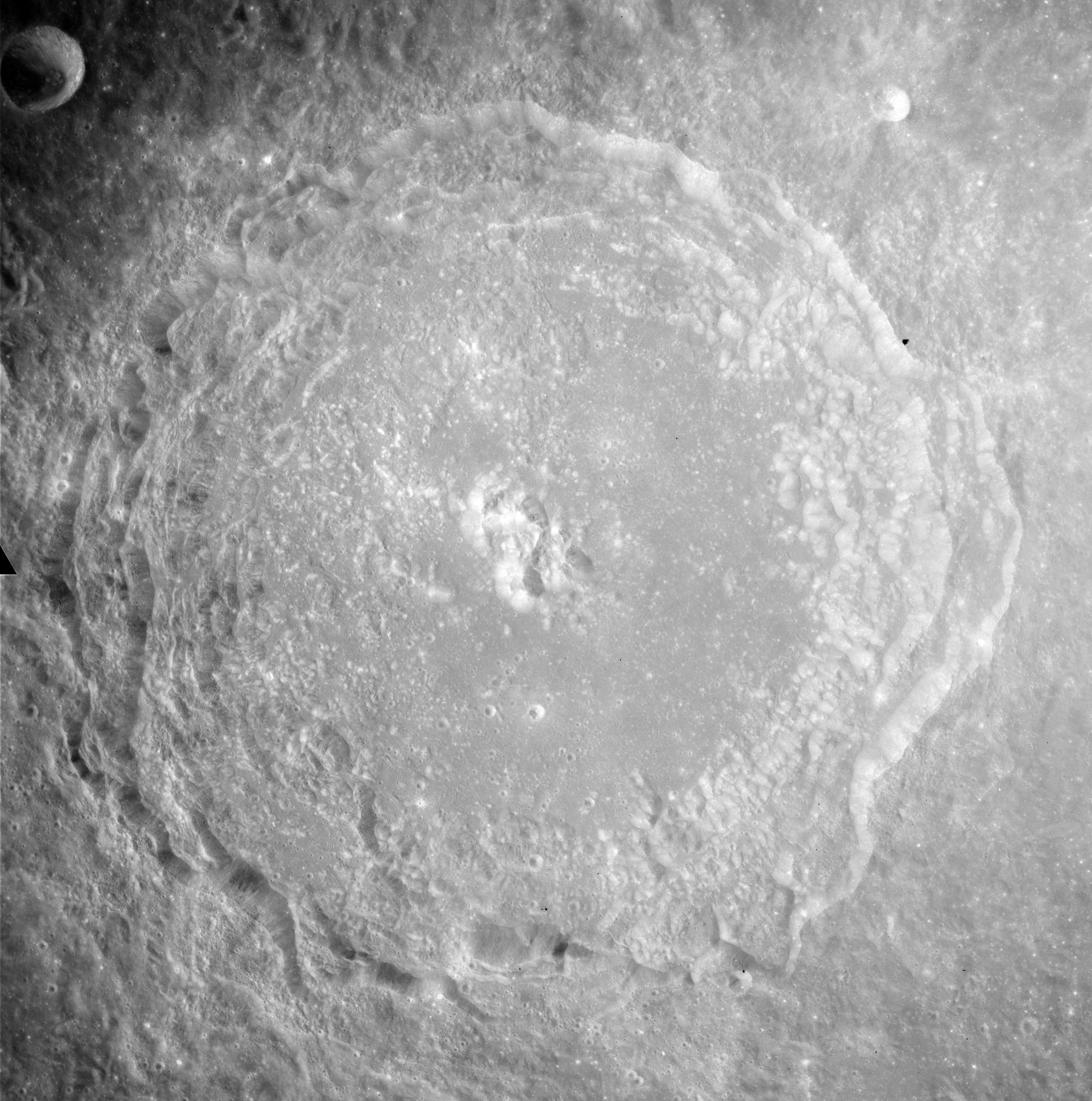
Apollo 15 Mapping camera image

Langrenus is an impact crater located near the eastern lunar limb. British astronomer T. W. Webb calls it "a superb object under oblique sunshine, with its terraced ring." The feature is circular in shape, but appears oblong due to foreshortening. It lies on the eastern shore of the Mare Fecunditatis. To the south is the overlapping crater pair Vendelinus and the smaller Lamé.

On the lunar geologic timescale, Langrenus is a crater of Eratosthenian age. The inner wall of Langrenus is wide and irregularly terraced, with an average width of about 20 kilometers. The outer ramparts are irregular and hilly, and there is a bright, fragmented ray system spread across the mare to the west.

The interior of the crater has a higher albedo than the surroundings, so the crater appears bright when the Sun is overhead. The crater floor is covered by many boulders, and is slightly irregular in the northwest half. The central peaks rise about a kilometer above the floor, and a peak on the eastern rim ascends to an altitude of 3 km. The infrared spectrum of pure crystalline plagioclase has been identified on the central peak.

On December 30, 1992, Audouin Dollfus of the Observatoire de Paris observed a series of glows on the floor of this crater using the one-meter telescope. These glows changed form with time, and Dollfus expressed the belief that this was likely a gaseous emission. The cracked floor of the crater may have been the source of the gas.

Flemish astronomer Michael van Langren was the first person to draw a lunar map while giving names to many of the features, in 1645. He named this crater after himself; it is the only one of his named features that has retained his original designation.

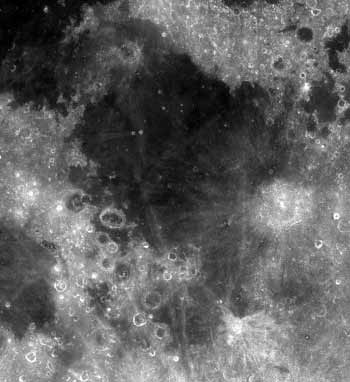
On the eastern edge of Mare Fecunditatis is the crater Langrenus, seen as the lighter grey area on the right-center of the photo.

== Satellite craters ==
By convention these features are identified on lunar maps by placing the letter on the side of the crater midpoint that is closest to Langrenus.

Langrenus	Latitude	Longitude	Diameter
E	12.7° S	60.6° E	30 km
G	12.1° S	65.4° E	23 km
H	8.0° S	64.3° E	23 km
L	13.2° S	62.2° E	12 km
M	9.8° S	66.4° E	17 km
N	9.0° S	65.7° E	12 km
P	12.1° S	63.1° E	42 km
Q	11.9° S	60.7° E	12 km
R	7.7° S	63.6° E	5 km
S	6.7° S	64.7° E	9 km
T	4.6° S	62.5° E	42 km
U	12.6° S	57.1° E	4 km
V	13.2° S	55.9° E	5 km
W	8.6° S	67.3° E	23 km
X	12.4° S	64.7° E	25 km
Y	7.8° S	66.9° E	27 km
Z	7.1° S	66.4° E	20 km

Many of the more significant associated craters that surround Langrenus have since been renamed by the IAU.

- Langrenus A — See Barkla.
- Langrenus B — See Naonobu.
- Langrenus C — See Acosta.
- Langrenus D — See Al-Marrakushi.
- Langrenus F — See Bilharz.
- Langrenus J — See Somerville.
- Langrenus K — See Atwood.
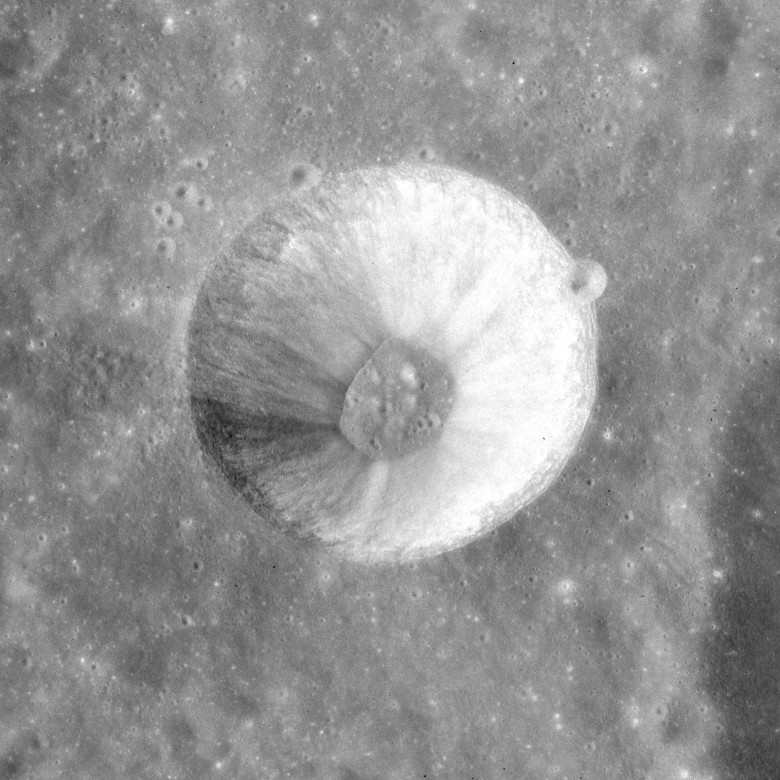
Langrenus M

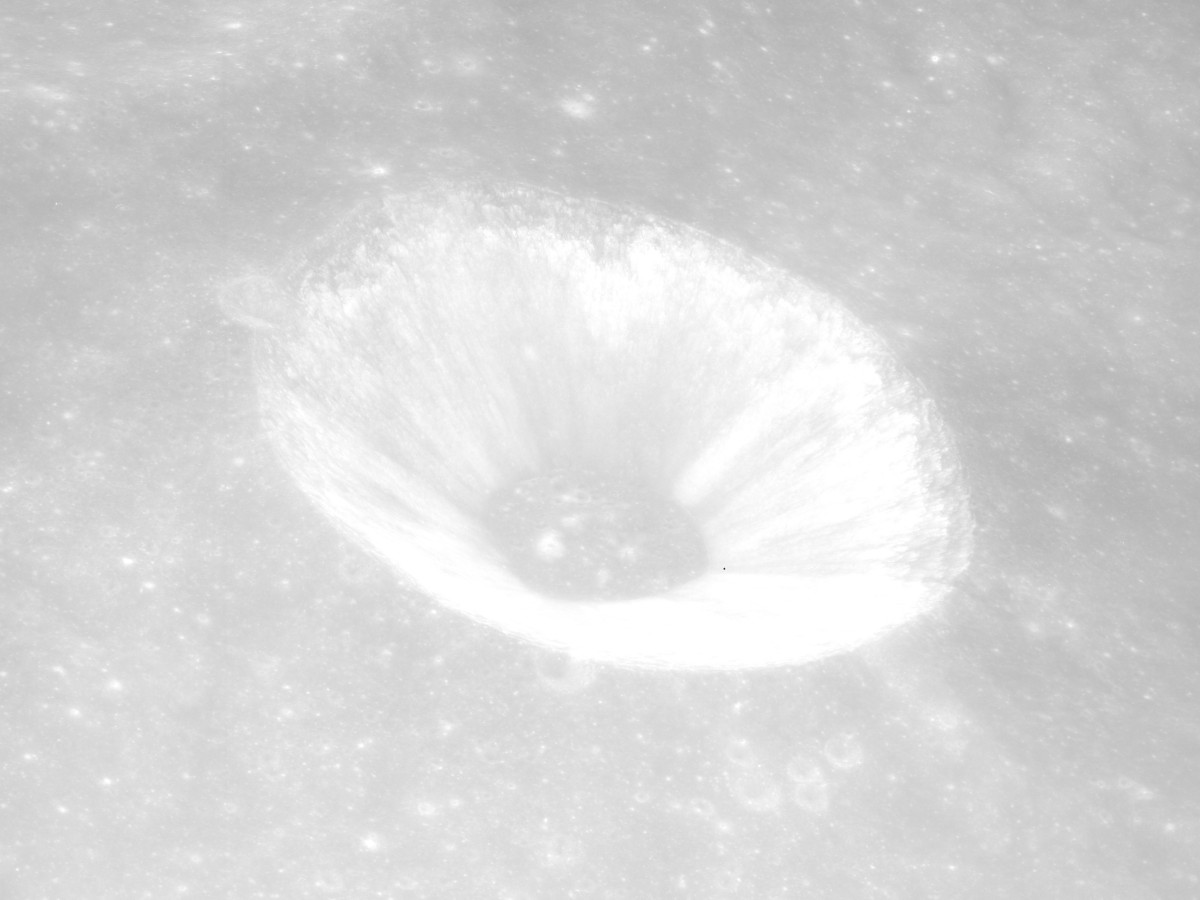
Langrenus M

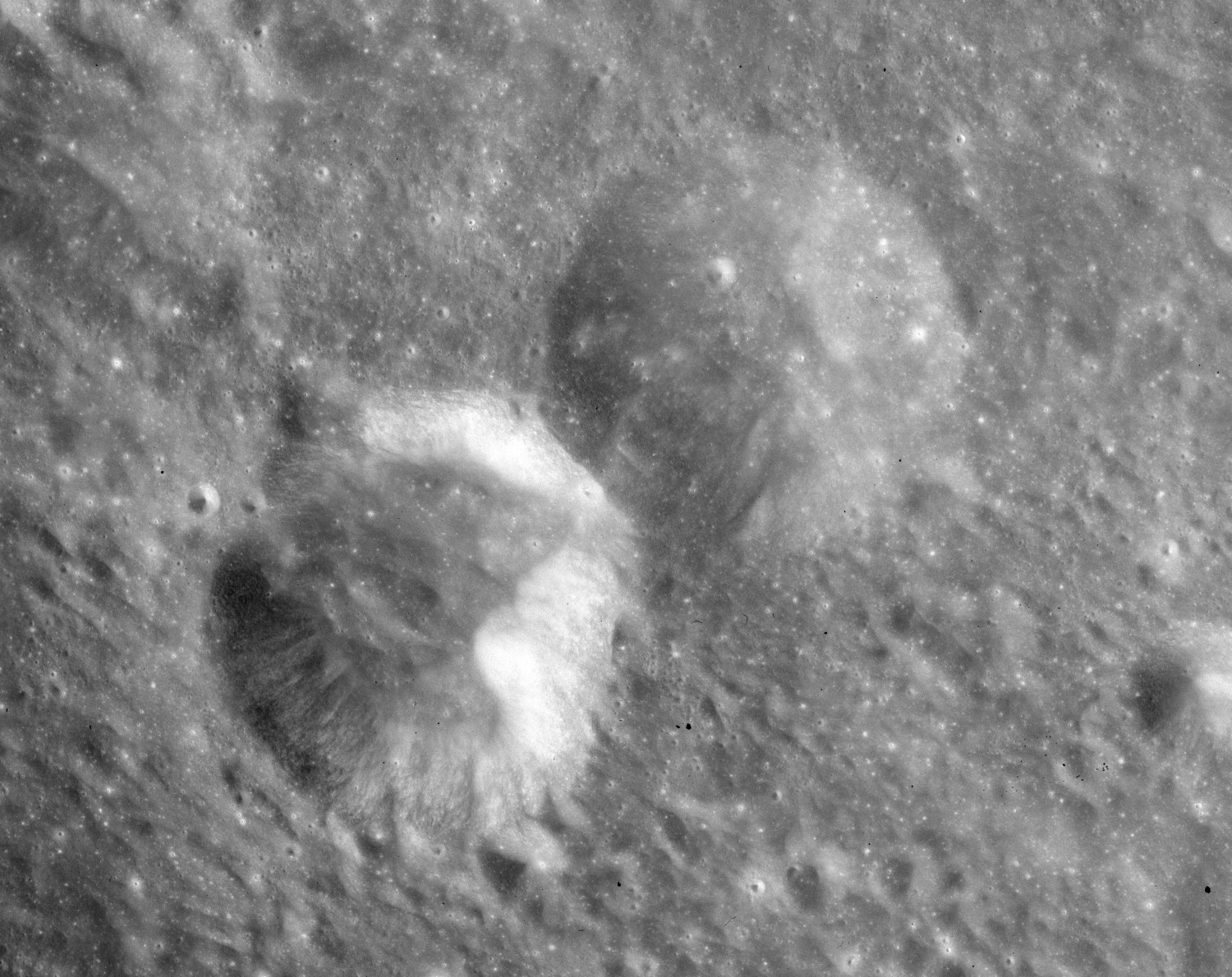
Langrenus X (lower left) and unnamed crater (upper right)
