= Edward S. Holden =

American astronomer (1846–1914)

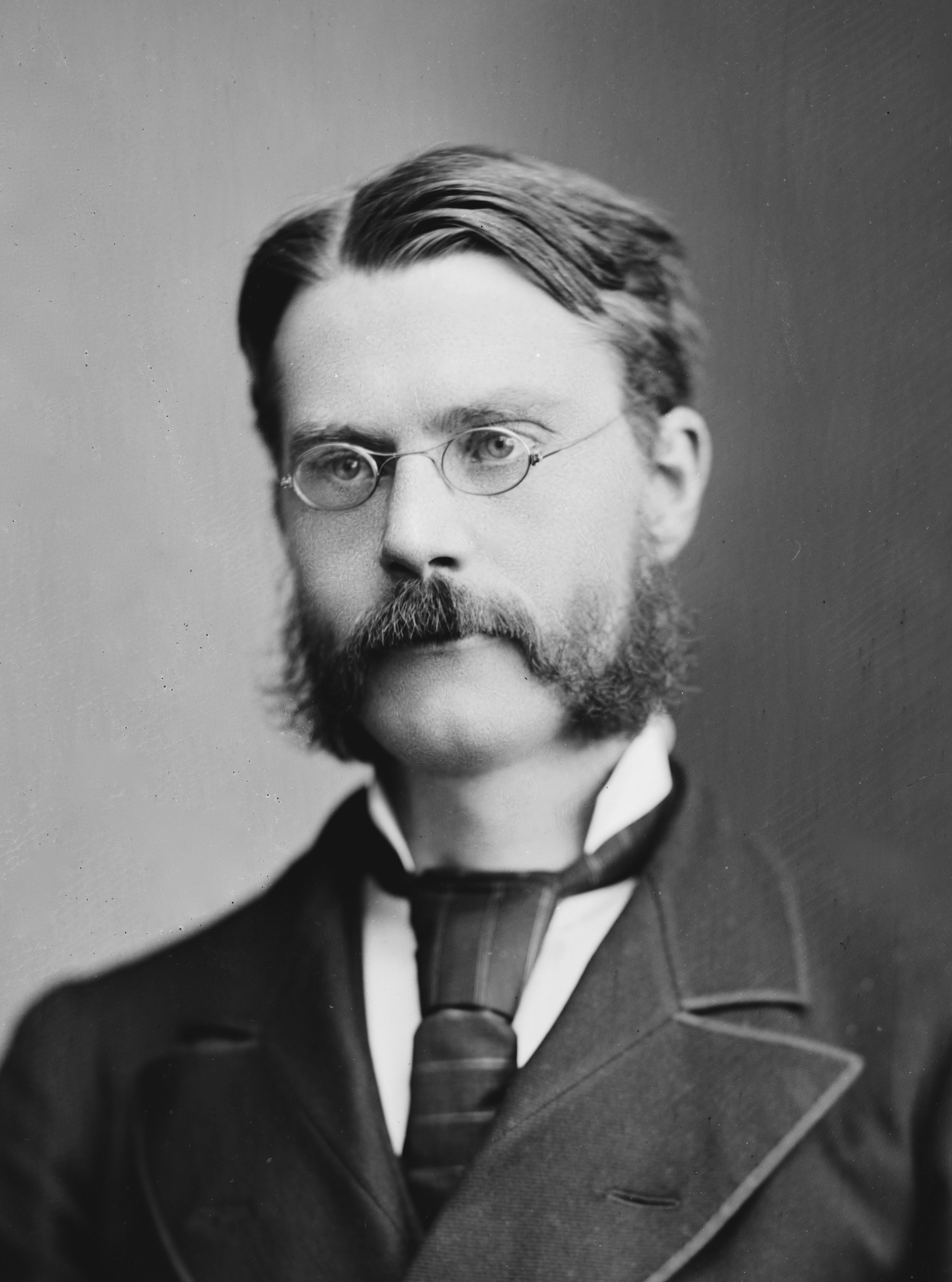
- Edward Singleton Holden sometime between 1870 and 1880
- Born: November 5, 1846; St. Louis, Missouri
- Died: March 16, 1914 (aged 67); West Point, New York
- Education: Washington University in St. Louis, B.S. degree; West Point, class of 1870
- Occupations: Astronomer, university president, professor of mathematics, librarian
- Employer(s): US Naval Observatory, Washburn Observatory at the University of Wisconsin–Madison, Lick Observatory, University of California, United States Military Academy
- Organization: Astronomical Society of the Pacific
- Known for: Fifth president of the University of California; discovered 22 NGC objects
- Parent(s): Jeremiah and Sarah Holden
- Relatives: Cousin George Phillips Bond, grandson, inventor Edward Singleton Holden
- Awards: Member, National Academy of Sciences

Edward Singleton Holden (November 5, 1846 – March 16, 1914) was an American astronomer and the fifth president of the University of California.

== Early years ==
He was born in St. Louis, Missouri, in 1846 to Edward and Sarah Frances (Singleton) Holden. From 1862 to 1866, he attended Washington University in St. Louis, where he obtained a B.S. degree. He later trained at West Point in the class of 1870.

== Career ==
In 1873 he became professor of mathematics at the US Naval Observatory, where he made a favorable impression on Simon Newcomb. On August 28, 1877, a few days after Asaph Hall discovered the moons of Mars Deimos and Phobos, he claimed to have found a third satellite of Mars. Further analysis showed large mistakes in his observations. He was director of Washburn Observatory at the University of Wisconsin–Madison from 1881 to 1885. He was elected a member of both the American National Academy of Sciences and the American Academy of Arts and Sciences in 1885. He discovered a total of 22 NGC objects during his work at Washburn Observatory.

Holden was president of the University of California from 1885 until 1888, and the first director of the Lick Observatory from 1888 until the end of 1897. He resigned as a result of internal dissent over his management among his subordinates. While at the Lick Observatory, he was the founder of the Astronomical Society of the Pacific and its first president (1889–1891). He also became a member of the American Philosophical Society. Holden was awarded five honorary degrees: an M.A. degree from Washington University in 1879, an LL.D. from the University of Wisconsin in 1886, an LL.D. from Columbia University in 1887, a Sc.D. from the University of the Pacific in 1896 and a Litt.D. from Fordham College in 1910.

In 1901, Holden became the librarian of the United States Military Academy at West Point, where he remained until his death. He was buried at the West Point Cemetery on March 18, 1914.

== Works ==
He wrote many books on popular science (and on other subjects, such as flags and heraldry), including science books intended for children, for example:

- Sir William Herschel: His Life and Works, 1881.
- The Mogul emperors of Hindustan, A.D. 1398 – A.D. 1707. New York : C. Scribner's Sons. 1895. On the Mughal Emperors.
- Real Things In Nature. A Reading Book of Science for American Boys and Girls, 1916.

== Legacy ==
Holden was a founding member of the Cosmos Club.

The asteroid 872 Holda, the crater Holden on the Moon and the crater Holden on Mars are all named in his honor.

== Family ==
His cousin George Phillips Bond was director of Harvard College Observatory. His grandson, also named Edward Singleton Holden, was a well known inventor with numerous patents to his name. He is credited with designing the rolled stainless steel gauge present in most modern fire extinguishers.

Academic offices
Preceded by W.T. Reid	President of the University of California; 1885–1888	Succeeded by Horace Davis
