= Al-Marrakushi (crater) =

Crater on the Moon

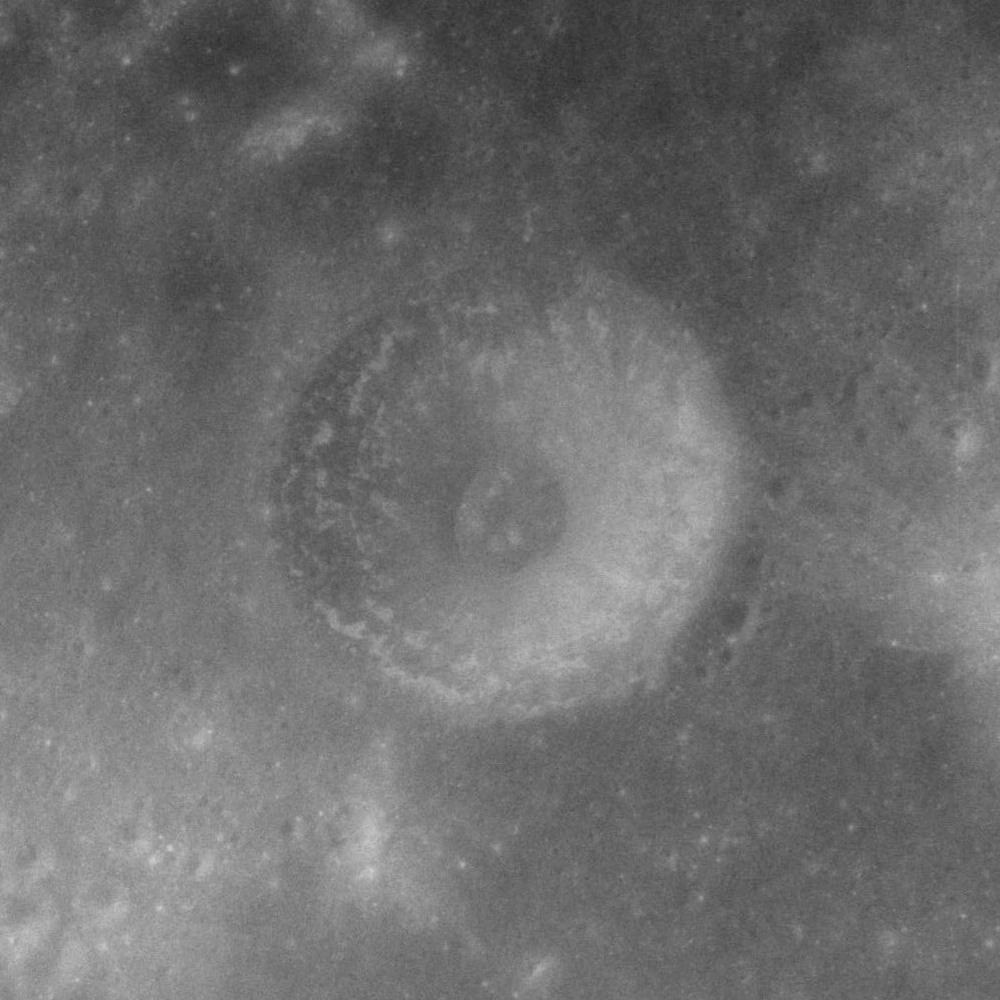
- Apollo 12 image
- Coordinates: 10.4°S 55.8°E
- Diameter: 8.57 km (5.33 mi)
- Depth: Unknown
- Colongitude: 304° at sunrise
- Eponym: Al-Marrakushi

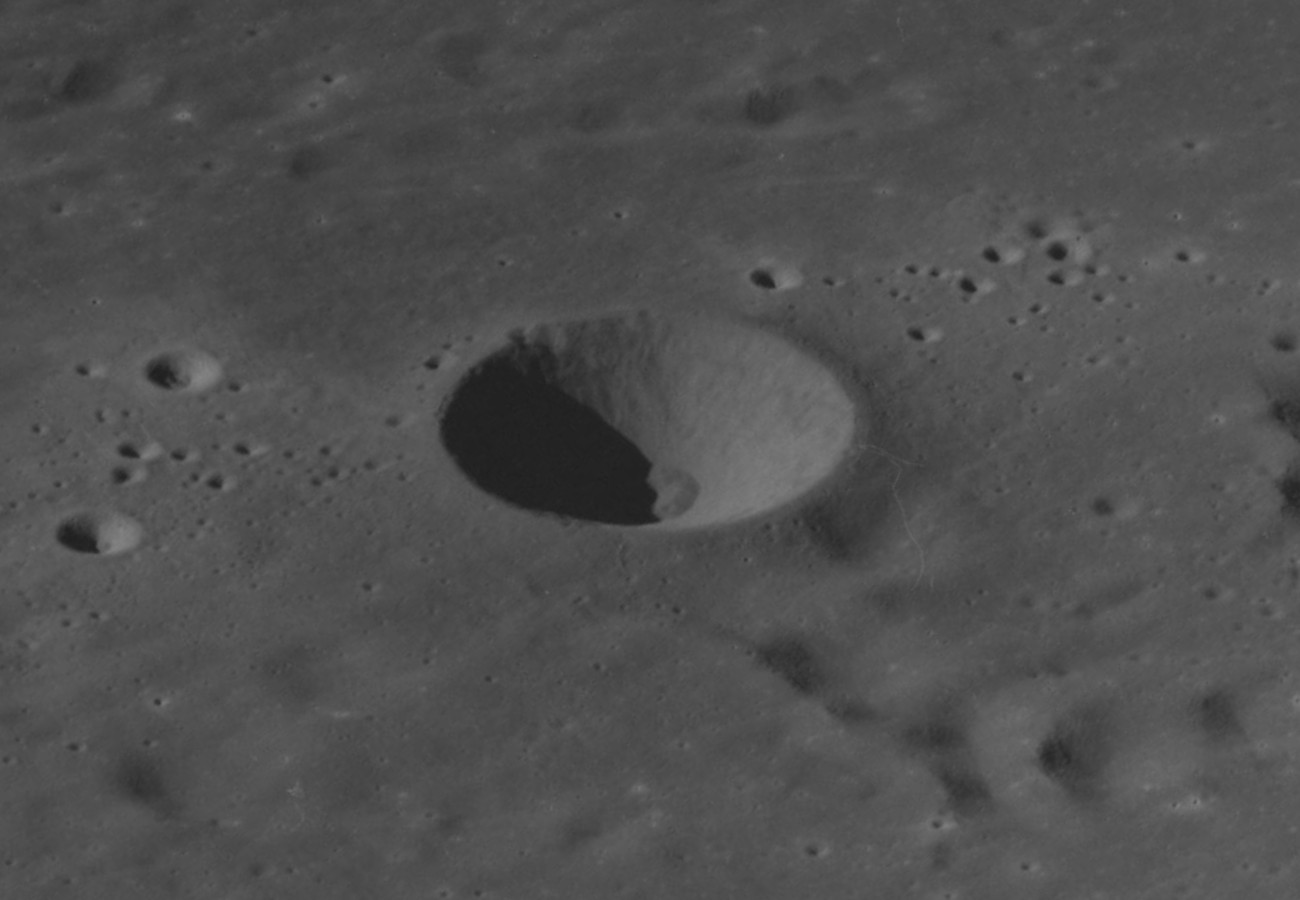
Apollo 8 image. The clusters of small craters to the left and right are secondary craters from Langrenus.

Al-Marrakushi is a small, relatively isolated lunar impact crater in the eastern Mare Fecunditatis. It is a circular, symmetrical formation, with inner walls that slope down to the midpoint. This crater has a higher iron content than the surrounding mare. To the northeast is the prominent crater Langrenus. The mare near Al-Marrakushi is marked by ray material from its larger neighbor.

This crater was identified as Langrenus D until it was given a name by the IAU in 1976. It was named after Moroccan astronomer and mathematician Abu Ali al-Hasan al-Marrakushi (fl. 2nd half of 13th century).
