= Atwood (crater) =

Crater on the Moon

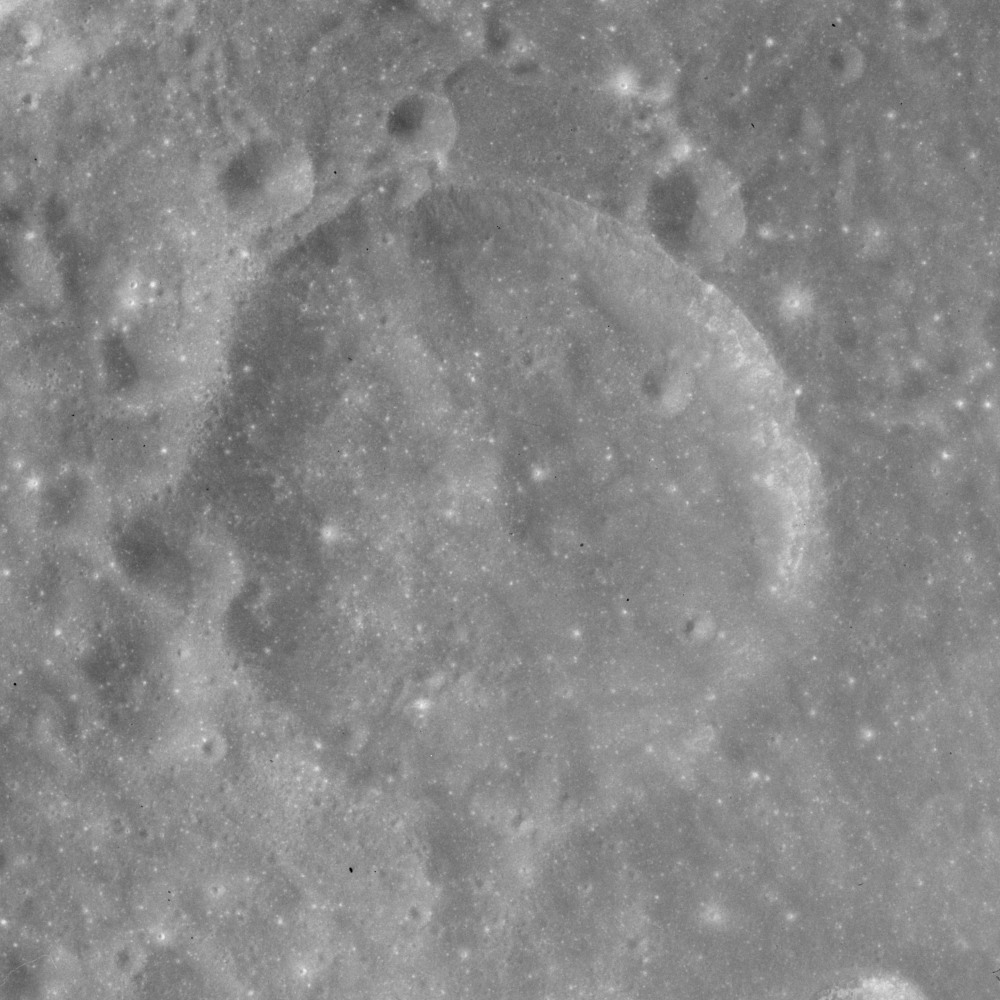
- Apollo 15 image
- Coordinates: 5.88°S 57.78°E
- Diameter: 28.64 km (17.80 mi)
- Depth: Unknown
- Colongitude: 302° at sunrise
- Eponym: George Atwood

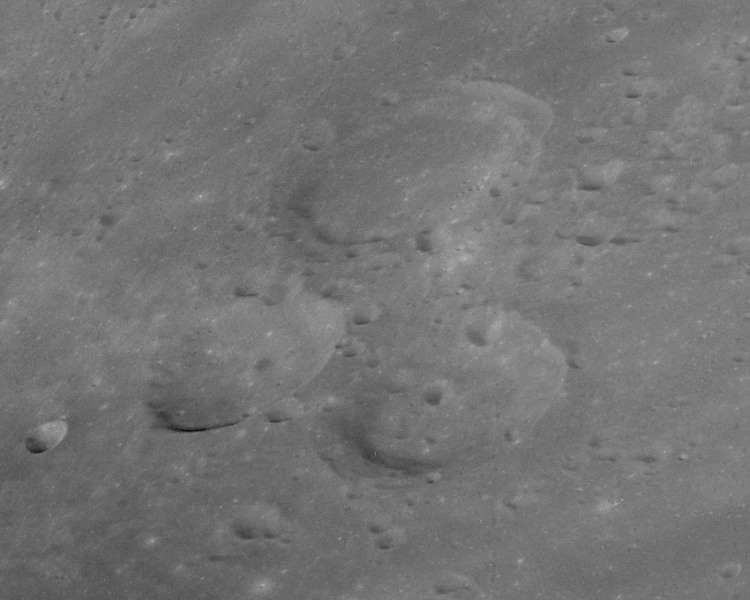
Oblique view of Bilharz (top), Atwood (lower left), and Naonobu (lower right), from Apollo 11

Atwood is a small earth moon impact crater that is located on the Mare Fecunditatis, to the northwest of the prominent crater Langrenus. It forms a triple-crater formation with Naonobu attached to the north rim and Bilharz near the west rim.

Atwood lies near the edge of the outer ramparts of Langrenus, and the ejecta forms low ridges attached to the south rim of Atwood. Within the flat interior floor is a low central peak that joins a ridge line to the north rim of the crater.

This crater is named after English mathematician George Atwood (1745–1807). Atwood was formerly designated Langrenus K, before being renamed by the IAU in 1976.
