= Black (crater) =

Crater on the Moon

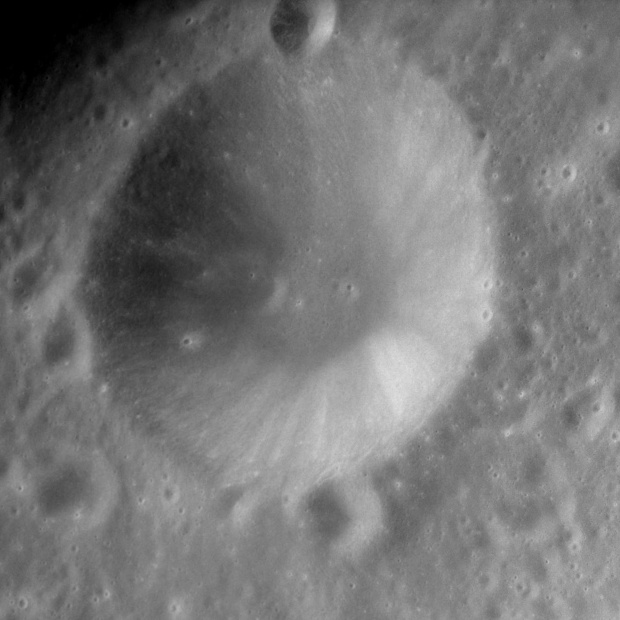
- Apollo 12 image
- Coordinates: 9.2°S 80.4°E
- Diameter: 19.46 km (12.09 mi)
- Depth: 3.17 km (1.97 mi)
- Colongitude: 280° at sunrise
- Eponym: Joseph Black

Black is a small lunar impact crater that is located near the eastern limb of the Moon, just to the southwest of the Mare Smythii. It lies just to the southeast of the walled basin Kästner. To the south-southwest of Black is the crater Ansgarius, and to the east is the small Dale.

Black is circular and bowl shaped with a well-defined edge, and inner walls that slope down to a small interior floor. It is not significantly marked by erosion or impacts. The northwest wall is separated from the rim of Kästner by less than one crater diameter.

This crater was formerly designated Kästner F before being named after the French-born Scottish chemist Joseph Black (1728-1799). Its designation was officially adopted by the IAU in 1976.
