= Barkla =

Barkla may refers to:

- Charles Barkla (1877–1944), British physicist, recipient of the 1917 Nobel Prize in Physics
  - Barkla (crater), a lunar impact crater named after him
- Nick Barkla, Australian actor
- Barkla Shop, a small hamlet in mid Cornwall, England
