= Kästner (crater) =

Crater on the Moon

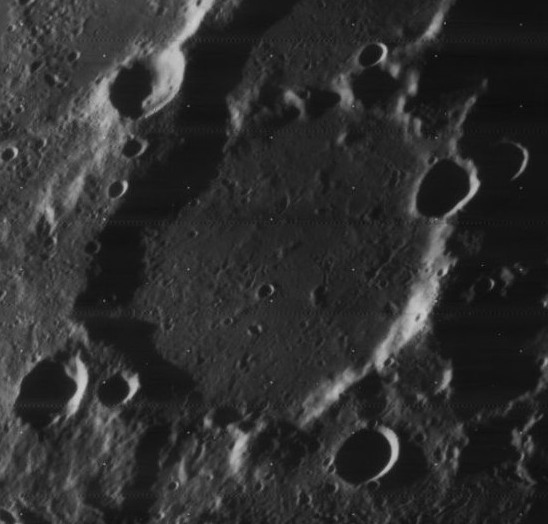
- Oblique Lunar Orbiter 4 image
- Coordinates: 6.90°S 78.94°E
- Diameter: 116.07 km
- Depth: 3.4 km
- Colongitude: 283° at sunrise
- Eponym: Abraham G. Kästner

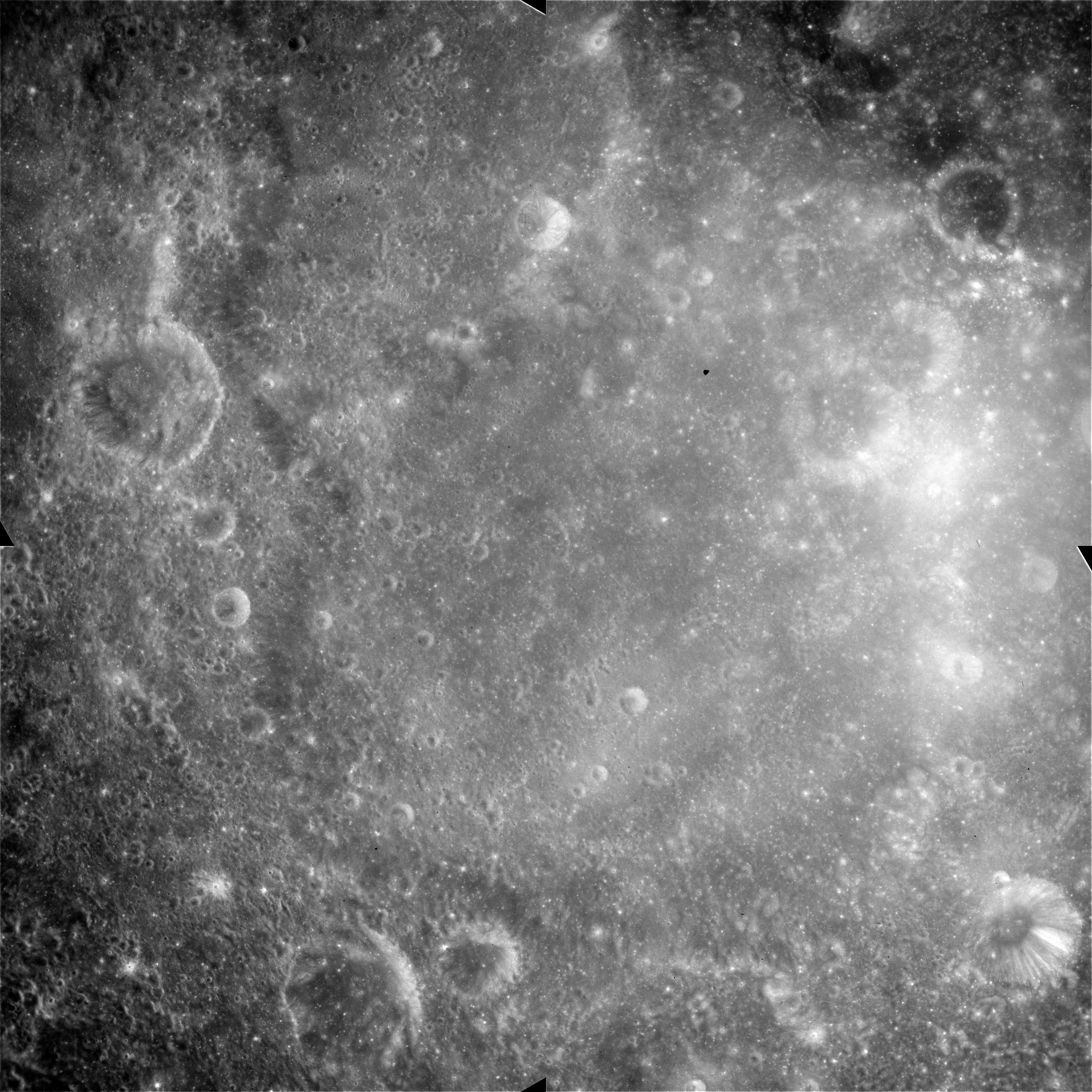
Apollo 15 mapping camera image with high sun angle, showing degree of erosion of the rims

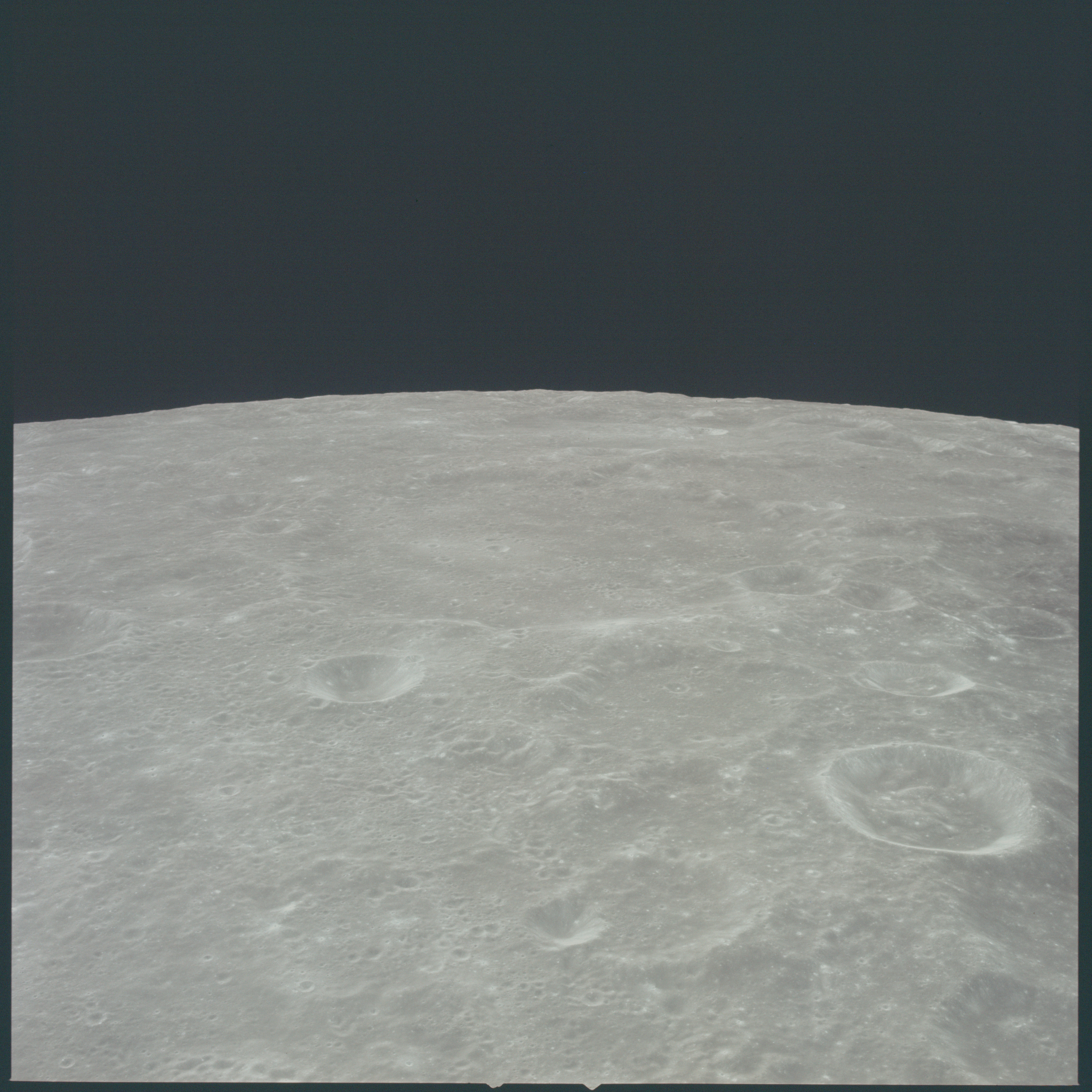
Oblique view centered on Kästner from Apollo 12, facing northwest

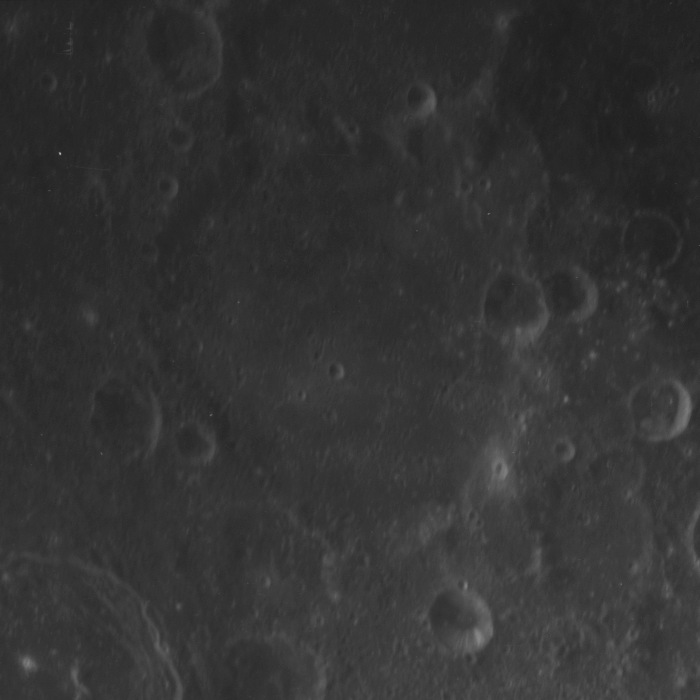
Oblique view from Apollo 14

Kästner is a lunar impact crater that is located near the eastern limb of the Moon, to the southwest of the Mare Smythii. Just to the northwest of Kästner is a walled plain named Gilbert. To the south is the prominent crater Ansgarius, and to the southwest lies La Pérouse.

This formation belongs to the category termed a walled plain. It has a worn, irregular outer wall that is overlaid by several small craters and there is a small break along the north-northeast. Along the northeastern rim is Kästner B, and to the southwest is the small Kästner E. A shallow, unnamed crater is attached to the southern rim. The interior floor is relatively level and featureless, with only a few small craters and minor ridges.

The crater's name was approved by the IAU in 1961.

== Satellite craters ==
By convention these features are identified on lunar maps by placing the letter on the side of the crater midpoint that is closest to Kästner.

Kästner	Latitude	Longitude	Diameter
A	4.5° S	77.3° E	25 km
B	6.3° S	80.7° E	20 km
C	8.0° S	76.9° E	19 km
E	8.1° S	77.6° E	10 km
G	4.2° S	79.0° E	72 km
R	6.9° S	82.3° E	17 km
S	8.0° S	83.2° E	30 km

The following crater has been renamed by the IAU.

- Kästner F — See Black.

Kästner B, R, and S are called Defoe, Chekhov, and Cellini on some older maps, but these names were not approved by the IAU.
