= Dale (crater) =

Crater on the Moon

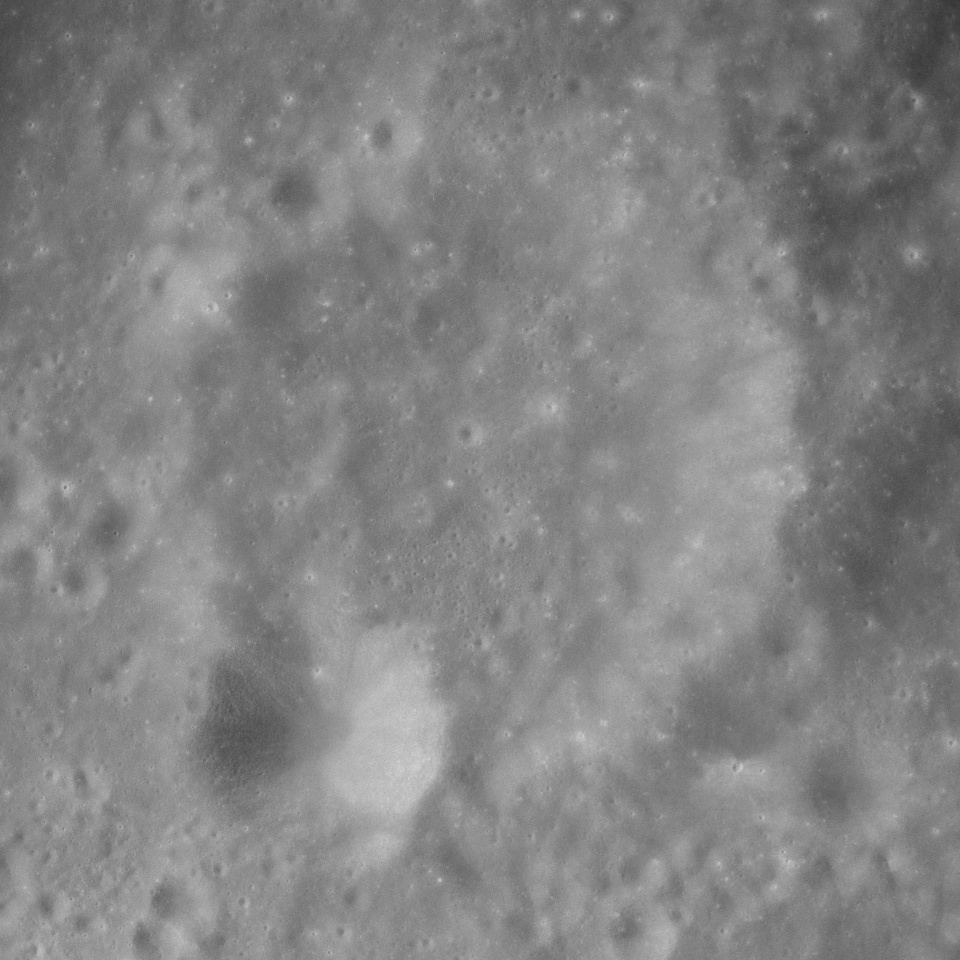
- Apollo 12 image
- Coordinates: 9.56°S 82.93°E
- Diameter: 23.41 km (14.55 mi)
- Depth: Unknown
- Colongitude: 278° at sunrise
- Eponym: Henry H. Dale

Dale is a small lunar impact crater located in the far eastern part of the Moon's near side, to the south of the Mare Smythii. It lies to the southeast of the larger crater Kastner and northeast of Ansgarius. The crater is located in a part of the lunar surface that is subject to libration, which can hide it from view for periods of time.

This is a relatively shallow and insignificant crater formation with a somewhat eroded outer rim. A smaller crater lies across the south-southwestern rim, creating a break into the interior. The rim is somewhat lower along the north edge than elsewhere.

The crater is named after British physiologist and Nobel laureate Sir Henry Hallett Dale. Its designation was officially adopted by the International Astronomical Union in 1976
