= Kapteyn (crater) =

Crater on the Moon

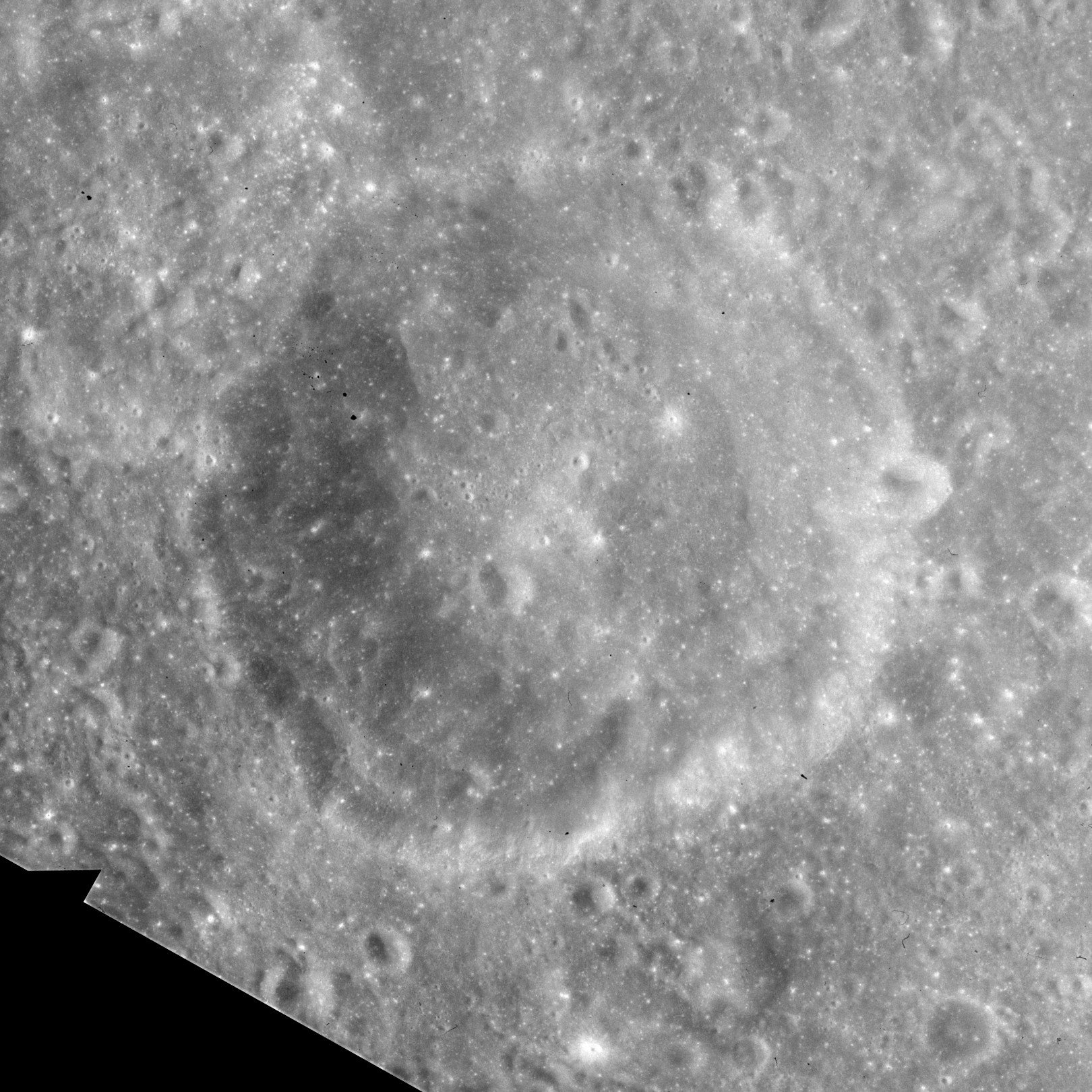
- Apollo 15 Mapping Camera image
- Coordinates: 10.79°S 70.59°E
- Diameter: 48.65 km (30.23 mi)
- Depth: Unknown
- Colongitude: 290° at sunrise
- Eponym: Jacobus C. Kapteyn

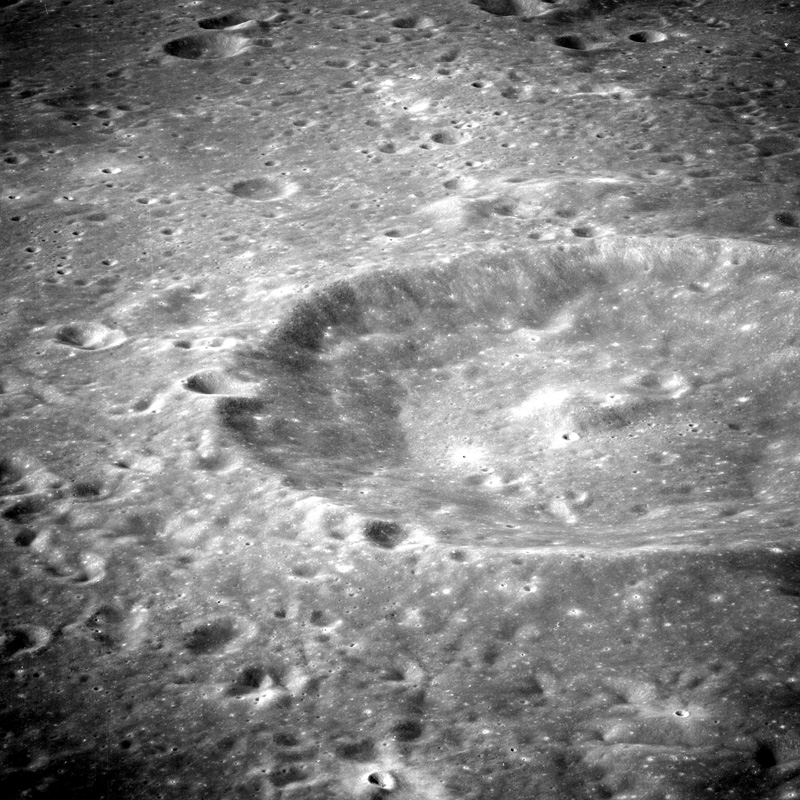
Oblique view from Apollo 8, facing south

Kapteyn is a lunar impact crater that is near the eastern limb of the Moon, to the west of the crater La Pérouse. West of Kapteyn is the slightly smaller Barkla, and farther to the west-northwest is the prominent Langrenus. Von Behring is to the north-northeast.

This crater is circular in shape, although it appears oval when viewed from the Earth due to foreshortening. The rim is only slightly worn, with no craters of note along the edge or the inner walls. There is a shelf along the eastern inner wall. At the midpoint of the interior floor is a central peak.

This crater is named after Dutch astronomer Jacobus C. Kapteyn (1851–1922). Its designation was officially adopted by the IAU in 1964.

== Satellite craters ==
By convention these features are identified on lunar maps by placing the letter on the side of the crater midpoint that is closest to Kapteyn.

Kapteyn	Latitude	Longitude	Diameter
A	14.2° S	71.3° E	31 km
B	15.6° S	71.0° E	39 km
C	13.3° S	70.2° E	48 km
D	14.5° S	70.6° E	12 km
E	8.8° S	69.3° E	31 km
F	14.5° S	70.3° E	9 km
K	13.1° S	71.9° E	8 km
Z	11.2° S	72.5° E	6 km
