= Von Behring (crater) =

Crater on the Moon

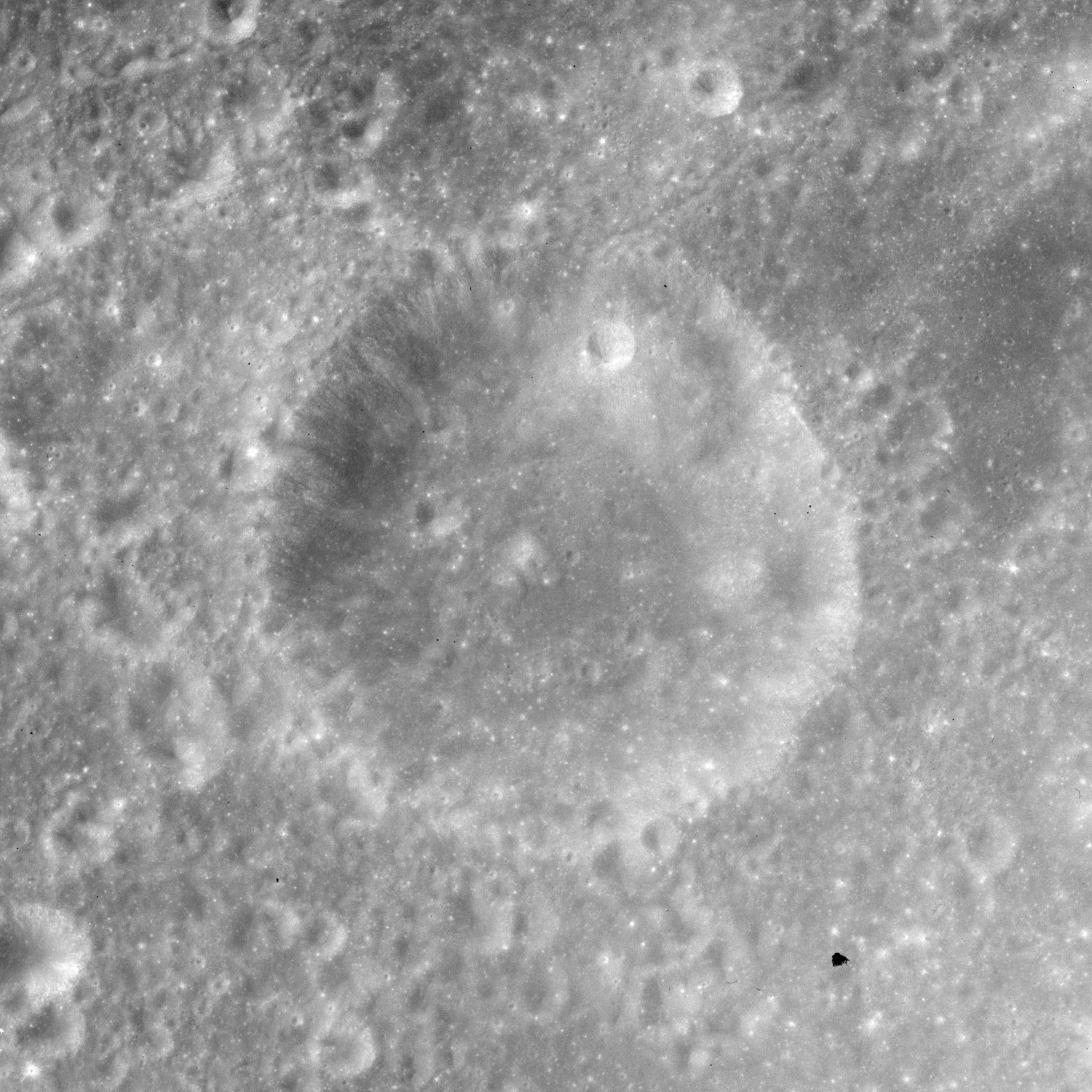
- Apollo 15 Mapping Camera image
- Coordinates: 7.75°S 71.72°E
- Diameter: 37.65 km (23.39 mi)
- Depth: 2.3 km
- Colongitude: 289° at sunrise
- Eponym: Emil A. von Behring

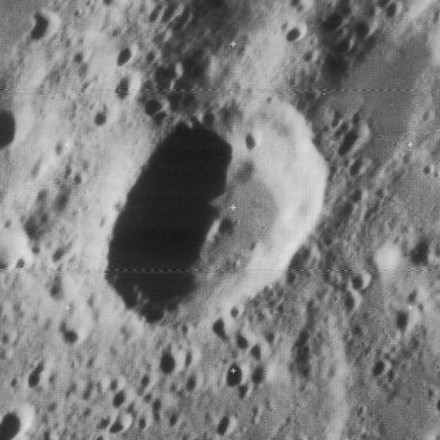
Lunar Orbiter 4 image

von Behring is a small lunar impact crater that is located in the eastern part of the Moon. It lies north-northeast of the larger Kapteyn and is to the northwest of La Pérouse. The crater is circular and symmetrical, with an outer rim that is only lightly eroded. There is a small central peak at the midpoint of the interior floor.

The crater was formerly designated Maclaurin F before being renamed by the IAU in 1979.
