= Alexander Stevenson (physician) =

British physician

Alexander Stevenson MD PRCPSG FRSE (1726–1791) was an 18th-century British physician who co-founded the Royal Society of Edinburgh in 1783. He was also twice President of the Royal College of Physicians and Surgeons of Glasgow (1757 and 1773).

== Life ==
He was born in Edinburgh in 1725/26 the son of Dr John Stevenson. Some sources say he was born in Dolgain in Ayrshire.

He studied medicine at Glasgow University gaining his doctorate (MD) in 1746. He set up practice in Glasgow and from 1766 to 1789 was also Professor of Medicine at Glasgow University, succeeding Prof Joseph Black.

On 29 October 1773 he had breakfast (also with Profs Reid and Anderson) with James Boswell and Dr Samuel Johnson during their visit to Glasgow.

He lived his later years in a house on the east side of Virginia Street.

He died in Glasgow on 29 May 1791.

== Family ==
He was married to Jean Pickegg.

His sister, Juliana Stevenson, was mother to Thomas Charles Hope. Hope succeeded him in his role as Professor of Medicine following his retirement in 1789.
