= Thomas Charles Hope =

British physician, chemist and lecturer

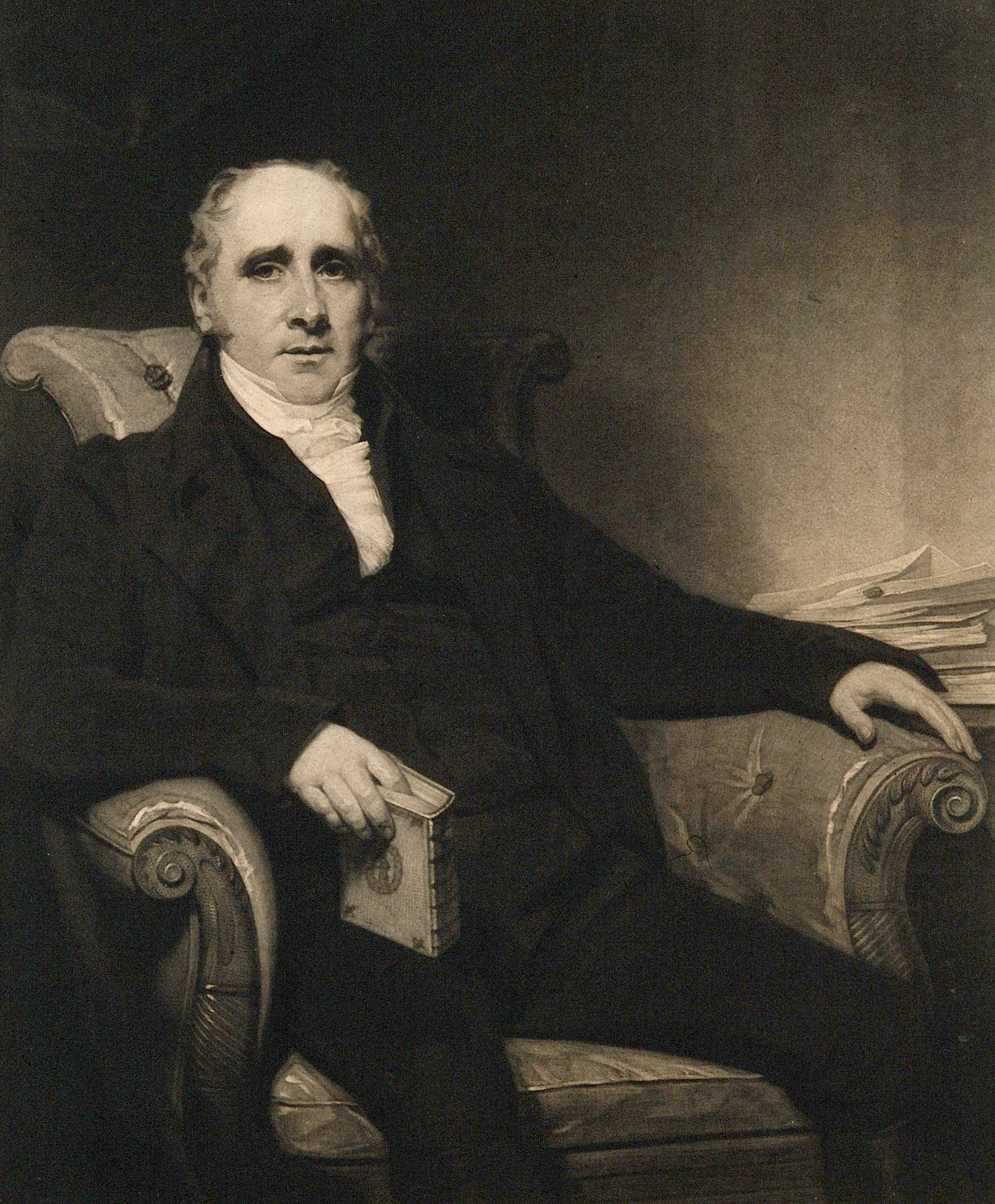
- Thomas Charles Hope, portrait by Henry Raeburn
- Born: 21 July 1766; Edinburgh, Scotland, Kingdom of Great Britain
- Died: 13 June 1844 (aged 77); Edinburgh, Scotland, United Kingdom of Great Britain and Ireland
- Education: University of Edinburgh; University of Paris
- Known for: Maximum density of water (Hope's experiment); Discovery of strontium
- Scientific career
- Fields: Chemistry, medicine
- Workplaces: Lecturer in chemistry, University of Glasgow; Professor of medicine and chemistry, University of Edinburgh; President, Royal College of Physicians of Edinburgh (1815–1819)
- Thesis: Tentamen inaugurale, quaedam de plantarum motibus et vita complectens (1787)
- Doctoral advisor: Joseph Black

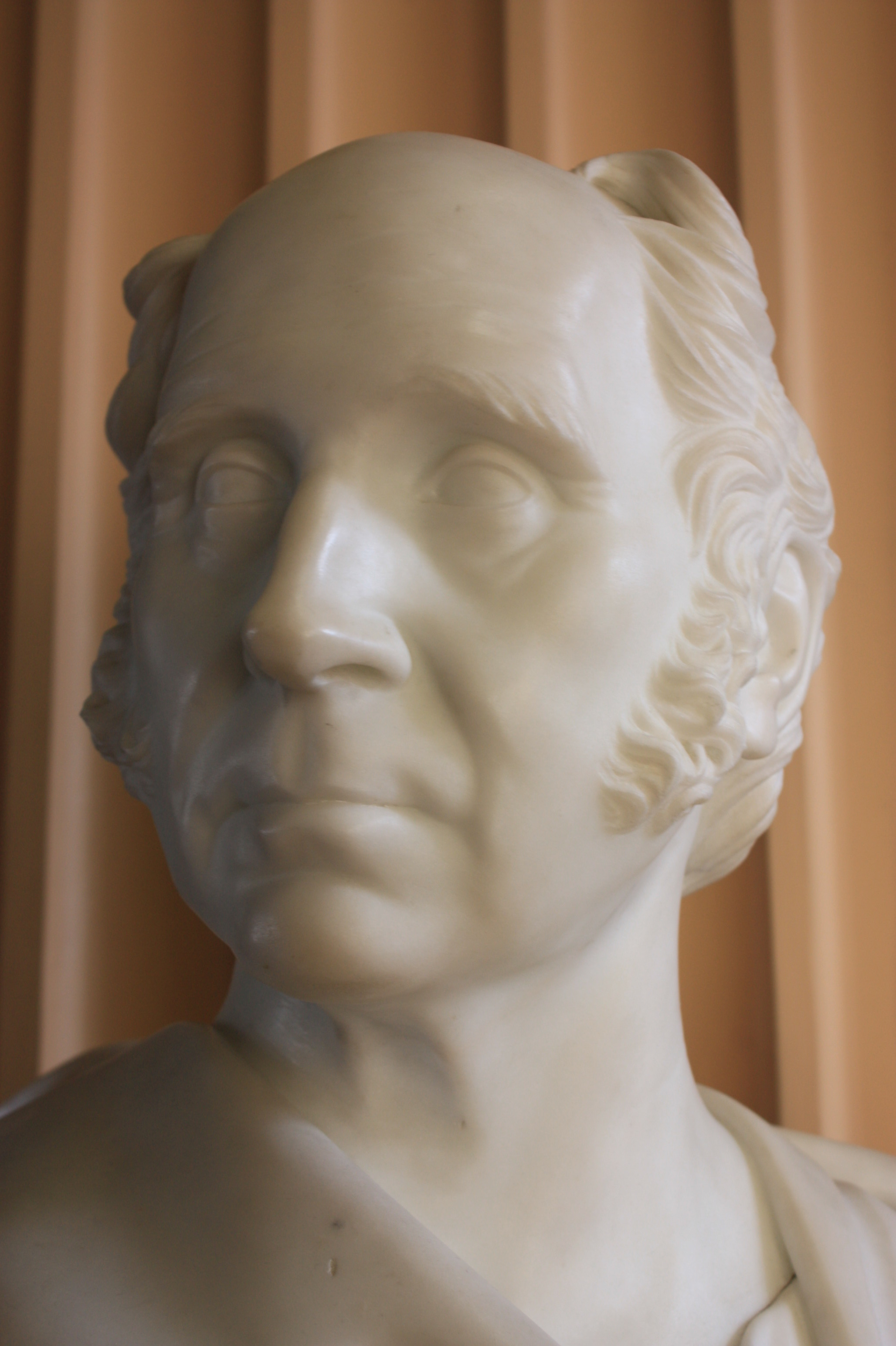
Bust of Thomas Charles Hope by Sir John Steell, Old College, University of Edinburgh

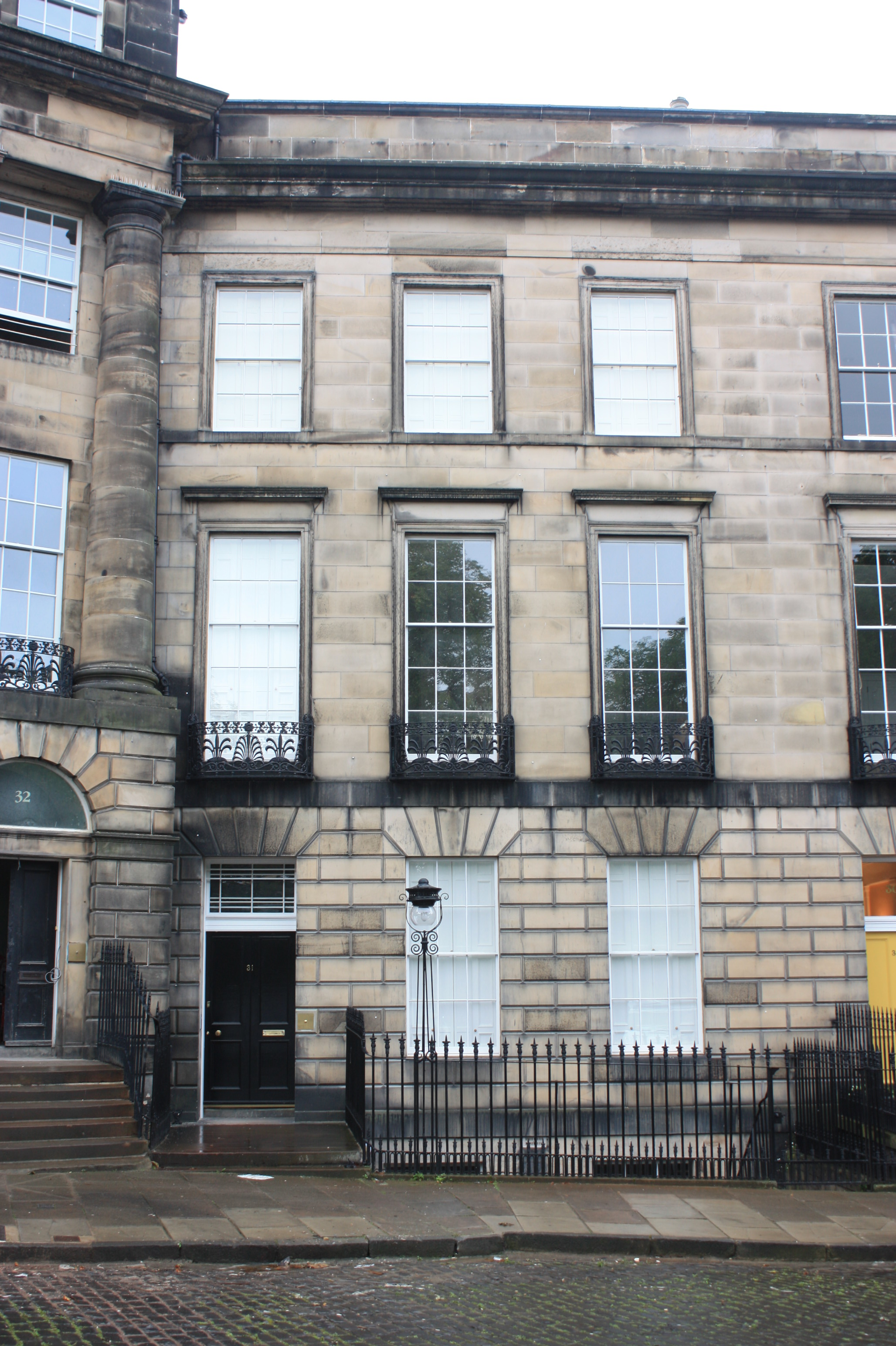
31 Moray Place, Edinburgh

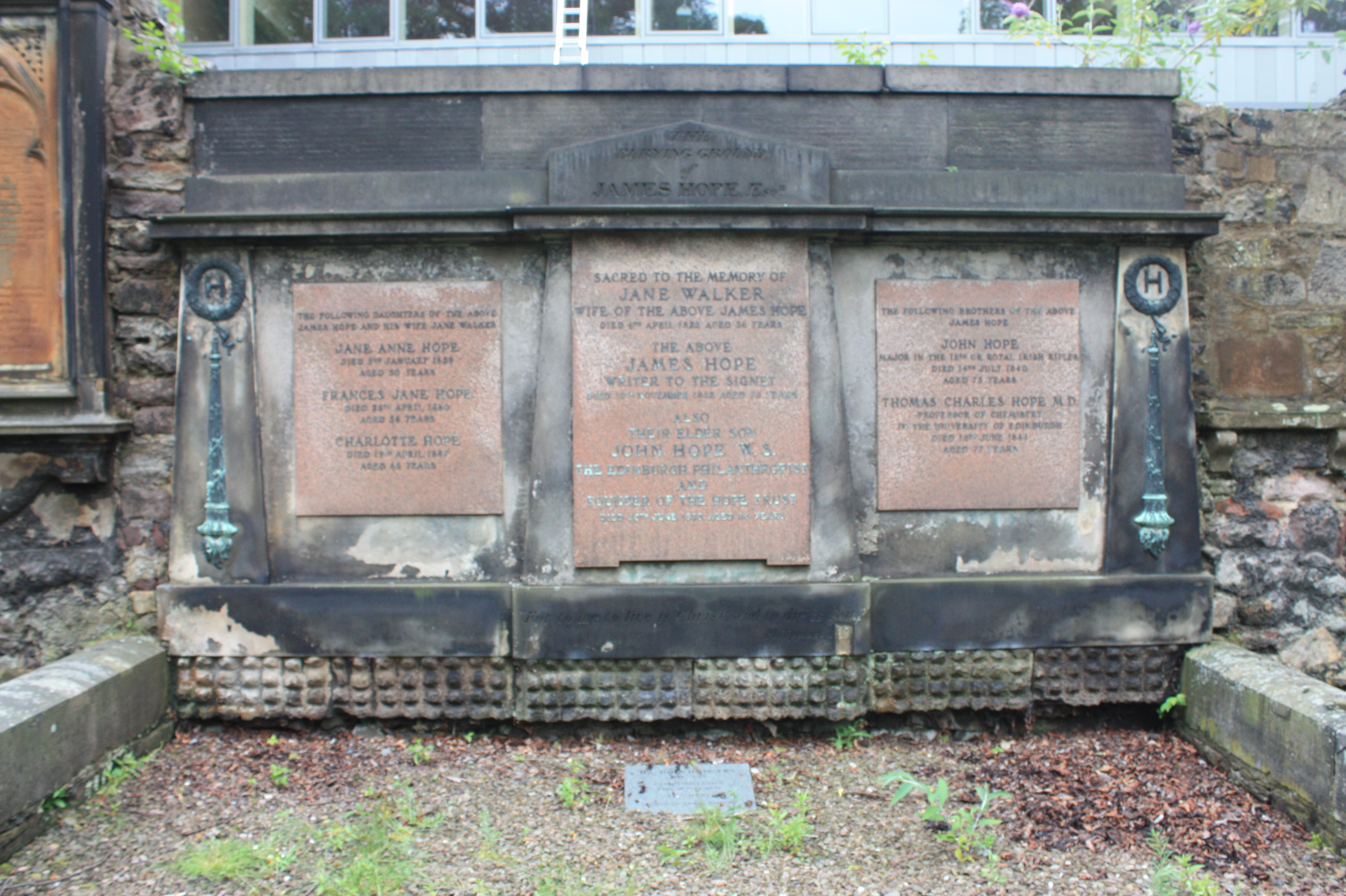
The Hope grave, Greyfriars Kirkyard, Edinburgh

Thomas Charles Hope FRSE FRS PRCPE FFPSG (21 July 1766 – 13 June 1844) was a Scottish physician, chemist and lecturer. He proved the existence of the element strontium, and gave his name to "Hope's Experiment", which shows that water reaches its maximum density at 4 °C (39 °F).

In 1815 Hope was elected as president of the Royal College of Physicians of Edinburgh (1815–19), and as vice-president of Royal Society of Edinburgh (1823–33) during the presidencies of Walter Scott and Thomas Makdougall Brisbane.

Charles Darwin was one of Hope's students at the college, and Darwin viewed his chemistry lectures as highlights in his otherwise largely dull education at the university.

== Early life ==
Born in Edinburgh, the third son of Juliana Stevenson and surgeon and botanist John Hope, he lived at High School Yards on the south side of the old town.

He was educated next door to his house at the High School, the University of Edinburgh (MD 1787) and the University of Paris. At the university he was a student of Professor Joseph Black.

Hope was a nephew of the physician Alexander Stevenson FRSE.

== University of Glasgow and the discovery of strontium ==
Hope was appointed lecturer in chemistry at the University of Glasgow in 1787, and professor of medicine in 1789.

In January 1788, on the proposal of John Walker, Daniel Rutherford and Alexander Monro, he was elected a Fellow of the Royal Society of Edinburgh.

In 1791–1792, Hope completed experiments on the chemical element strontium, proposing the name Stronities for it, after Strontian, the west highland village where he found strontianite. The element was later renamed to strontium. On 4 November 1793, Hope presented his findings, An account of a Mineral from Strontian and of a Peculiar Species of Earth which it contains, to the Royal Society of Edinburgh.

In the experiment that bears his name, Hope determined the maximum density of water and explained why icebergs float.

== Edinburgh and the university ==
Hope was elected a fellow of the Royal Society of Edinburgh in 1788, and served as its vice president from 1822 to 1833. In 1791 following the death of his uncle, Alexander Stevenson, Hope succeeded him in his uncle's role as professor of Medicine at Glasgow University.

In 1795 Hope was selected by Joseph Black as his assistant (1795–1799) and eventual successor to the professorship of medicine and chemistry (1799–1843) at the University of Edinburgh. Hope’s goal was to more fully combine the practice of medicine with his chemical instruction.

In 1796 Hope was elected a member of the Harveian Society of Edinburgh and served as president in 1800 and 1816.

In 1800 Hope won the annual Edinburgh Arrow archery competition.

In 1804 he became a member of the Highland Society.

In 1805 he was elected a member of the Aesculapian Club.

In May 1810 he was elected a Fellow of the Royal Society of London.

From 1815 to 1819 he served as President of the Royal College of Physicians of Edinburgh.

Between 1824–40 Hope worked with scientists based in Poissy, France. With the town's major, Jean-François Senincourt, he tried to establish a university in the town. Within a few years their aims began to be realised as medical students crowded his lectures.

In 1828 he gave £800 to found a chemistry prize at the University of Edinburgh.

In the 1830s he is listed as living at 31 Moray Place, a large townhouse in the Moray Estate on the western edge of Edinburgh's New Town.

In 1843 he resigned the professorship.

He died at his home, 31 Moray Place in Edinburgh's West End in 1844. He is buried in Greyfriars Kirkyard in central Edinburgh. The grave lies against the western wall of the original churchyard, towards the north-west corner.

== Works ==
- Hope, Thomas Charles. An account of a mineral from Strontian: and of a peculiar species of earth which it contains. p. 39.
- Hope, Thomas Charles. "On the beads for ascertaining the specific gravity of liquid". Transactions of the Highland & Agricultural Society. 5 (1). Highland and Agricultural Society: 181.
- Hope, Thomas Charles; Rutherford, Daniel; Duncan, Andrew (1796). Thomas Charles Hope lectures: on Chemistry. p. 280.
- Telford, Thomas; Hope, Thomas Charles (1813). Reports on the means of improving the supply of water for the city of Edinburgh: and on the quality of the different springs in the neighbourhood. Printed for Archibald Constable. p. 76.
- Hope, Thomas Charles; University of Edinburgh (1833). Summary of a memorial to be presented to the Right Honourable the Lord Provost ...: respecting the institution of a professorship of practical chemistry in the University of Edinburgh. p. 17.

== Hope's apparatus ==
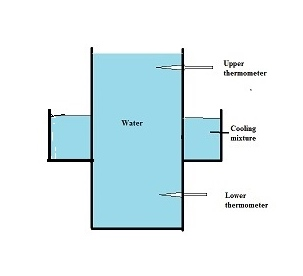
Hope's apparatus

Hope's apparatus consists of a vertical vessel full of water surrounded round the middle by a trough of cooling ice. Two thermometers, one above and one below the trough, measure the temperature of the water. It is designed to demonstrate that water reaches its maximum density at 4 °C (39 °F).

As the water in the central part of the vessel cools towards 4 °C (39 °F) (and thus becomes denser) it sinks to the bottom of the vessel, displacing the warmer water. The lower thermometer will then read a constant 4 °C (39 °F). Further cooling towards 0 °C (32 °F) will cause the now less dense water to rise to the top of the vessel, where the upper thermometer will then read a constant 0 °C (32 °F).
