= Joseph Black =

British physicist and chemist (1728–1799)

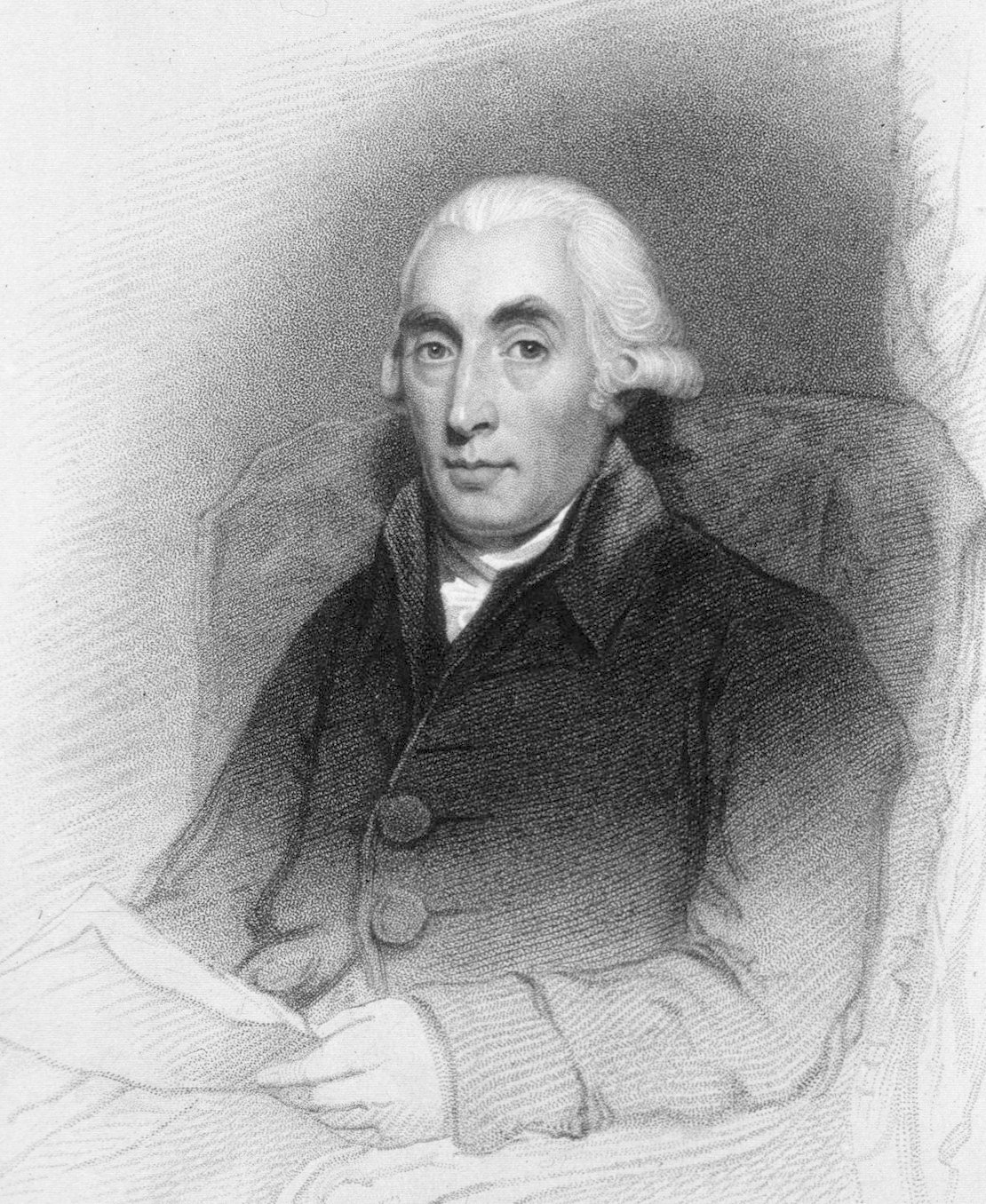
- Mezzotint engraving by James Heath after Sir Henry Raeburn
- Born: 16 April 1728; Bordeaux, France
- Died: 6 November 1799 (aged 71); Edinburgh, Scotland
- Education: University of Glasgow; University of Edinburgh
- Known for: The discovery of Magnesium carbon dioxide Latent heat specific heat Invention of Analytical balance
- Scientific career
- Fields: Medicine, physics, chemistry
- Workplaces: University of Edinburgh
- Academic advisors: William Cullen
- Notable students: James Edward Smith; Thomas Charles Hope

Joseph Black (16 April 1728 – 6 November 1799) was a Scottish physicist and chemist, known for his discoveries of magnesium, latent heat, specific heat, and carbon dioxide. He was professor of anatomy and chemistry at the University of Glasgow for 10 years from 1756, and then professor of medicine and chemistry at the University of Edinburgh from 1766, teaching and lecturing there for more than 30 years.

The chemistry buildings at both the University of Edinburgh and the University of Glasgow are named after Black. The latter celebrated its centenary in 2024, with alumni from eighty years back attending.

== Early life and education ==
Black was born "on the banks of the river Garonne" in Bordeaux, France, the sixth of the 12 children of Margaret Gordon (d. 1747) and John Black. His mother was from an Aberdeenshire family that had connections with the wine business and his father was from Belfast, Ireland, and worked as a factor in the wine trade. He was educated at home until the age of 12, after which he attended grammar school in Belfast. In 1746, at the age of 18, he entered the University of Glasgow, studying there for four years before spending another four at the University of Edinburgh, furthering his medical studies. During his studies he wrote a doctorate thesis on the treatment of kidney stones with the salt magnesium carbonate.

== Scientific Studies ==
=== Chemistry ===
==== Chemical principles ====
Like most 18th-century experimentalists, Black's conceptualisation of chemistry was based on five principles of matter: Water, Salt, Earth, Fire and Metal. He added the principle of Air when his experiments showed the presence of carbon dioxide, which he called fixed air, thus contributing to pneumatic chemistry.

Black's research was guided by questions relating to how the principles combined with each other in various different forms and mixtures. He used the term affinity to describe the force that held such combinations together. Throughout his career he used a variety of diagrams and formulas to teach his University of Edinburgh students how to manipulate affinity through different kinds of experimentation.

==== Analytical balance ====
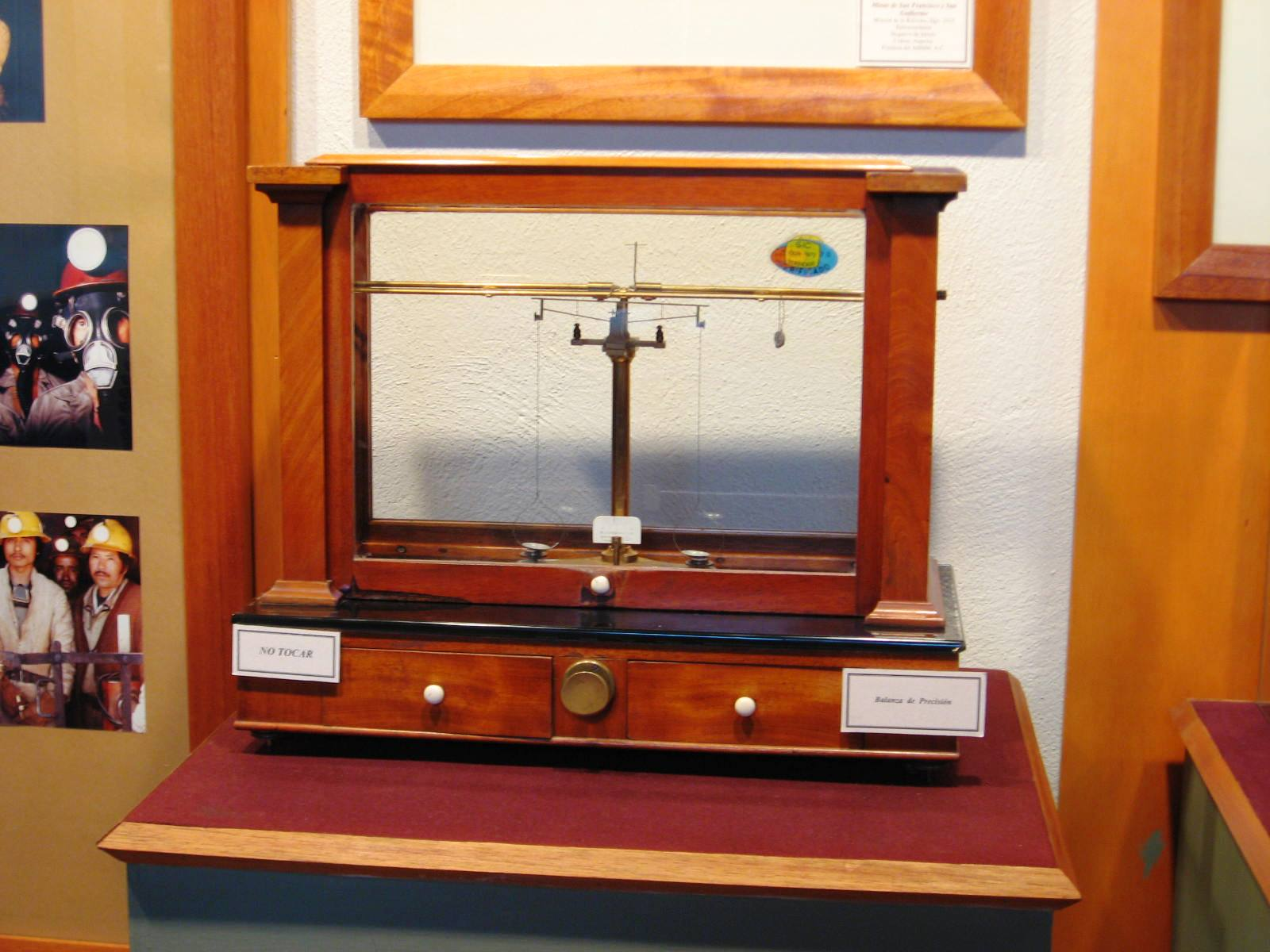
A precision analytical balance

In about 1750, while still a student, Black developed the analytical balance based on a light-weight beam balanced on a wedge-shaped fulcrum. Each arm carried a pan on which the sample or standard weights was placed. It far exceeded the accuracy of any other balance of the time and became an important scientific instrument in most chemistry laboratories.

==== Carbon dioxide ====
Black also explored the properties of a gas produced in various reactions. He found that limestone (calcium carbonate) could be heated or treated with acids to yield a gas he called "fixed air." He observed that the fixed air was denser than air and did not support either flame or animal life. Black also found that when bubbled through an aqueous solution of lime (calcium hydroxide), it would precipitate calcium carbonate. He used this phenomenon to illustrate that carbon dioxide is produced by animal respiration and microbial fermentation.

=== Heat ===
In 1757, Black was appointed Regius Professor of the Practice of Medicine at the University of Glasgow. In 1756 or soon thereafter, he began an extensive study of heat.

==== Specific heat ====
In 1760, Black realized that when two different substances of equal mass but different temperatures are mixed, the changes in number of degrees in the two substances differ, though the heat gained by the cooler substance and lost by the hotter is the same. Black related an experiment conducted by Daniel Gabriel Fahrenheit on behalf of Dutch physician Herman Boerhaave. For clarity, he then described a hypothetical, but realistic variant of the experiment: If equal masses of 100 °F water and 150 °F mercury are mixed, the water temperature increases by 20 ° and the mercury temperature decreases by 30 ° (to 120 °F), though the heat gained by the water and lost by the mercury is the same. This clarified the distinction between heat and temperature. It also introduced the concept of specific heat capacity, being different for different substances. Black wrote: “Quicksilver [mercury] ... has less capacity for the matter of heat than water.”

==== Latent heat ====
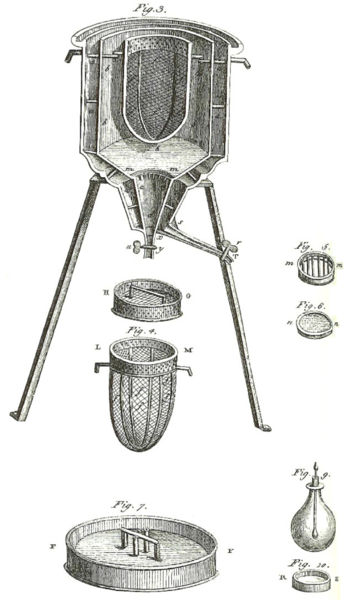
The world's first ice-calorimeter, used in the winter of 1782–83, by Antoine Lavoisier and Pierre-Simon Laplace, to determine the heat evolved in various chemical changes, calculations which were based on Joseph Black's prior discovery of latent heat.

In 1761, Black deduced that the application of heat to ice at its melting point does not cause a rise in temperature of the ice/water mixture, but rather an increase in the amount of water in the mixture. Additionally, Black observed that the application of heat to boiling water does not result in a rise in temperature of a water/steam mixture, but rather an increase in the amount of steam. From these observations, he concluded that the heat applied must have combined with the ice particles and boiling water and become latent.

The theory of latent heat marks the beginning of thermodynamics. Black's theory of latent heat was one of his more-important scientific contributions, and one on which his scientific fame chiefly rests. He also showed that different substances have different specific heats.

The theory ultimately proved important not only in the development of abstract science but in the development of the steam engine. Black and James Watt became friends after meeting around 1757 while both were at Glasgow. Black provided significant financing and other support for Watt's early research in steam power. Black's discovery of the latent heat of water would have been interesting to Watt, informing his attempts to improve the efficiency of the steam engine invented by Thomas Newcomen and develop the science of thermodynamics.

== Professorship ==
In 1766, treading in the footsteps of his friend and former teacher at the University of Glasgow, Black succeeded William Cullen as Professor of Medicine and Chemistry at the University of Edinburgh (Cullen had moved to Edinburgh in 1755). His position at Glasgow University was filled by Alexander Stevenson.

At this point he gave up research and devoted himself exclusively to teaching. In this he was successful with audience attendance at his lectures increasing from year to year for more than thirty years. His lectures had a powerful effect in popularising chemistry and attendance at them even came to be a fashionable amusement.

Black was widely recognised as one of the most popular lecturers at the university. His chemistry course regularly attracted an exceptionally high number of students, with many attending two or three times. In addition to regularly introducing cutting-edge topics and meticulously selecting visually impressive experiments, Black employed a wide array of successful teaching tools that made chemistry accessible to his students (many of whom were as young as 14 years old). His students came from across the United Kingdom, its colonies and Europe, and hundreds of them preserved his lectures in their notebooks and disseminated his ideas after they left university.

He became one of the principal ornaments of the university; and his lectures were attended by an audience which continued increasing from year to year, for more than thirty years. It could not be otherwise. His personal appearance and manners were those of a gentleman, and peculiarly pleasing. His voice in lecturing was low, but fine; and his articulation so distinct, that he was perfectly well heard by an audience consisting of several hundreds. His discourse was so plain and perspicuous, his illustration by experiment so apposite, that his sentiments on any subject never could be mistaken even by the most illiterate; and his instructions were so clear of all hypothesis or conjecture, that the hearer rested on his conclusions with a confidence scarcely exceeded in matters of his own experience.

On 17 November 1783 he became one of the founders of the Royal Society of Edinburgh. From 1788 to 1790 he was president of the Royal College of Physicians of Edinburgh. He was a member of the revision committee for the editions of the college's Pharmacopoeia Edinburgensis of 1774, 1783, and 1794. Black was appointed principal physician to King George III in Scotland.

Black's research and teaching were reduced as a result of poor health. From 1793 his health declined further and he gradually withdrew from his teaching duties. In 1795, Charles Hope was appointed his coadjutor in his professorship, and in 1797, he lectured for the last time.

== Personal life ==
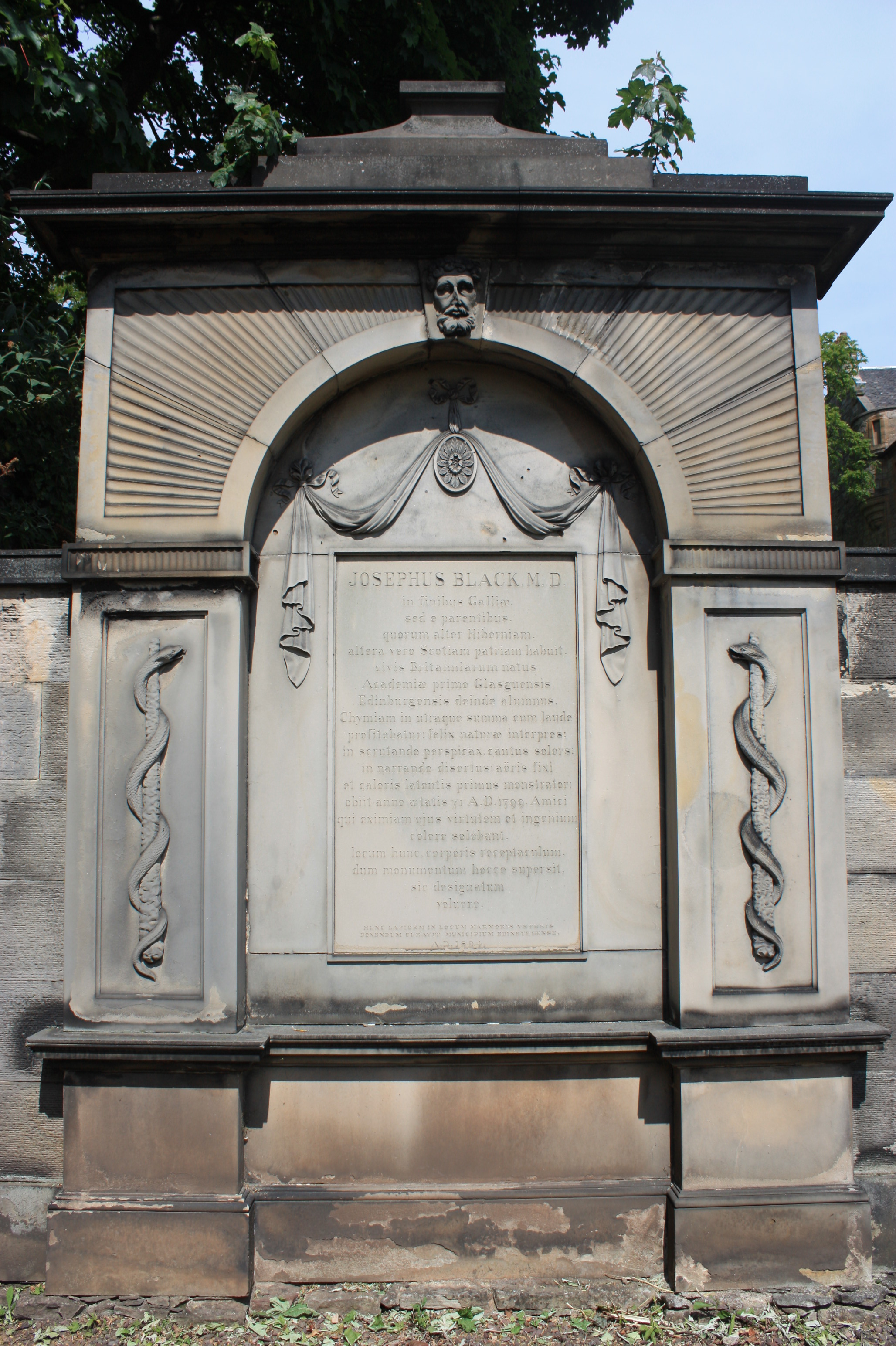
Joseph Black's grave in Greyfriars Kirkyard in Edinburgh

Black was a member of The Poker Club. He was 1st cousin, great friend and colleague to Adam Ferguson FRSE who married his niece Katherine Burnett in 1767, and associated with David Hume, Adam Smith, and the literati of the Scottish Enlightenment. He was also close to pioneering geologist James Hutton.

In 1773 he is listed as living on College Wynd on the south side of the Old Town. In the 1790s, he used Sylvan House in Sciennes as a summer retreat. A plaque, unveiled in 1991, commemorates his occupancy of the house.

Black never married. He died peacefully at his home 12 Nicolson Street in south Edinburgh in 1799 at the age of 71 and is buried in Greyfriars Kirkyard. The large monument lies in the sealed section to the south-west known as the Covenanter's Prison. The lunar crater Black was named after him in 1976.

In 2011, scientific equipment believed to belong to Black was discovered during an archaeological dig at the University of Edinburgh.

== See also ==
- Calorimetry
- Heat
- Pneumatic chemistry
- Thermochemistry
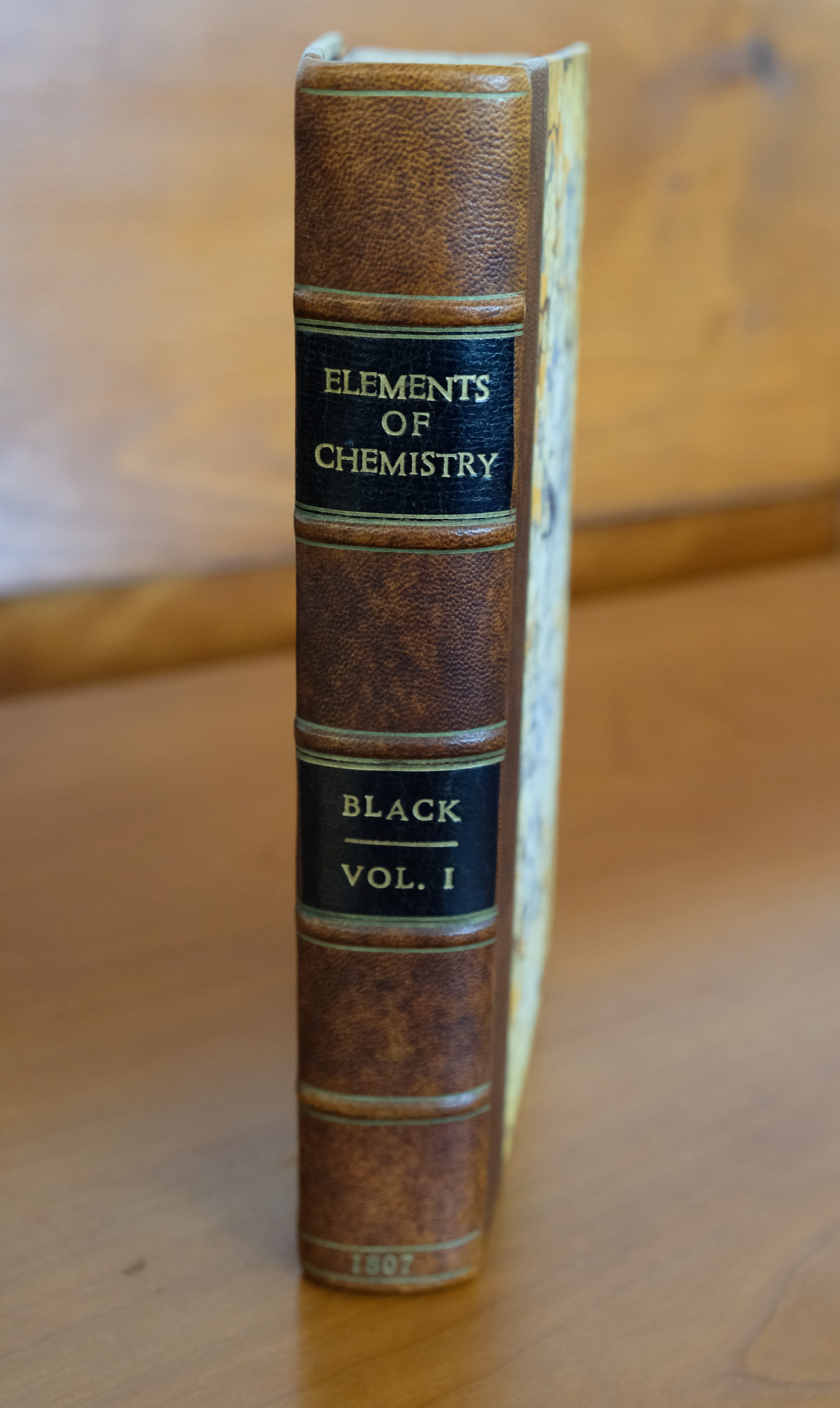
1807 copy of volume I of Joseph Black's Lectures on the Elements of Chemistry

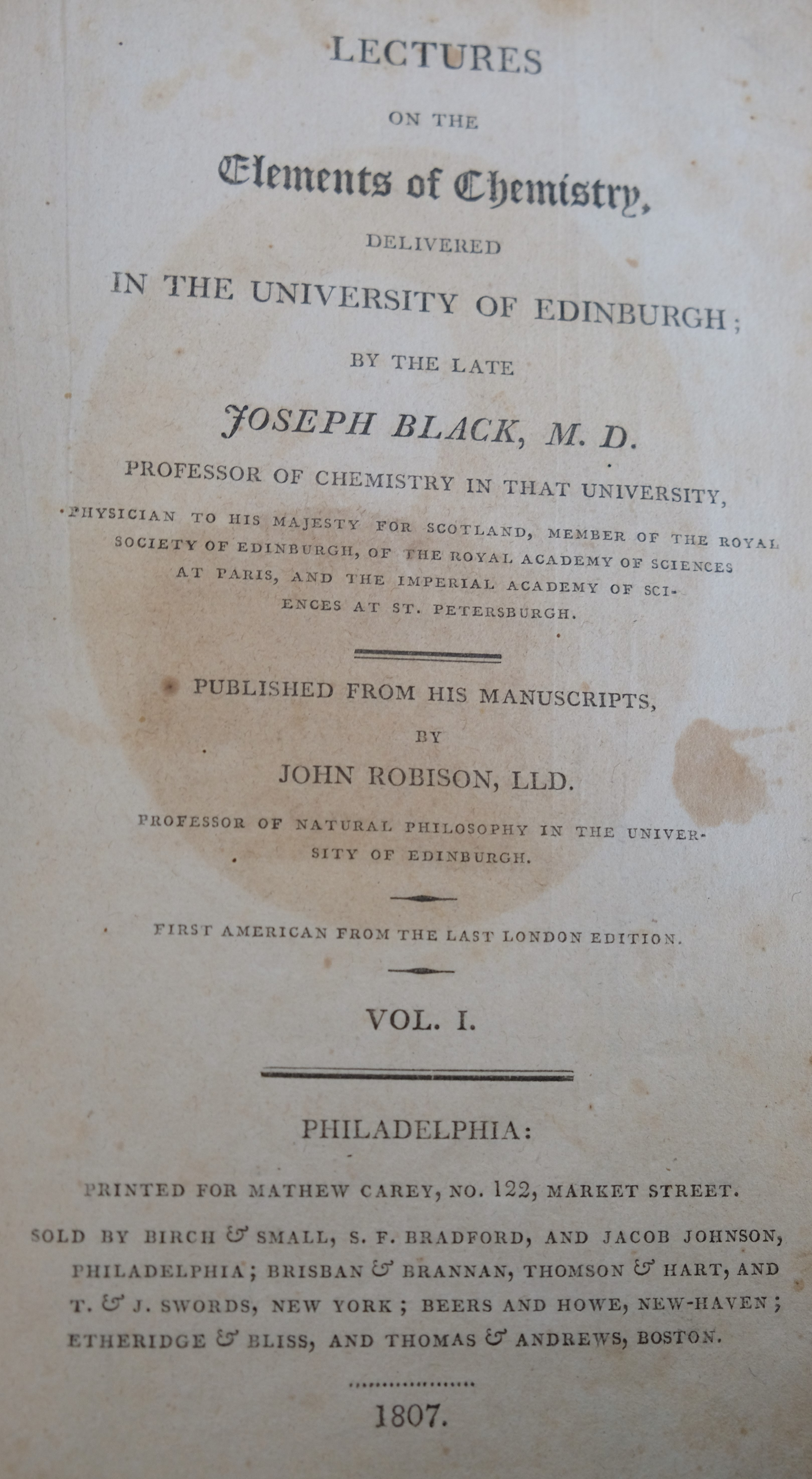
First page of a 1807 copy of volume I of Joseph Black's Lectures on the Elements of Chemistry

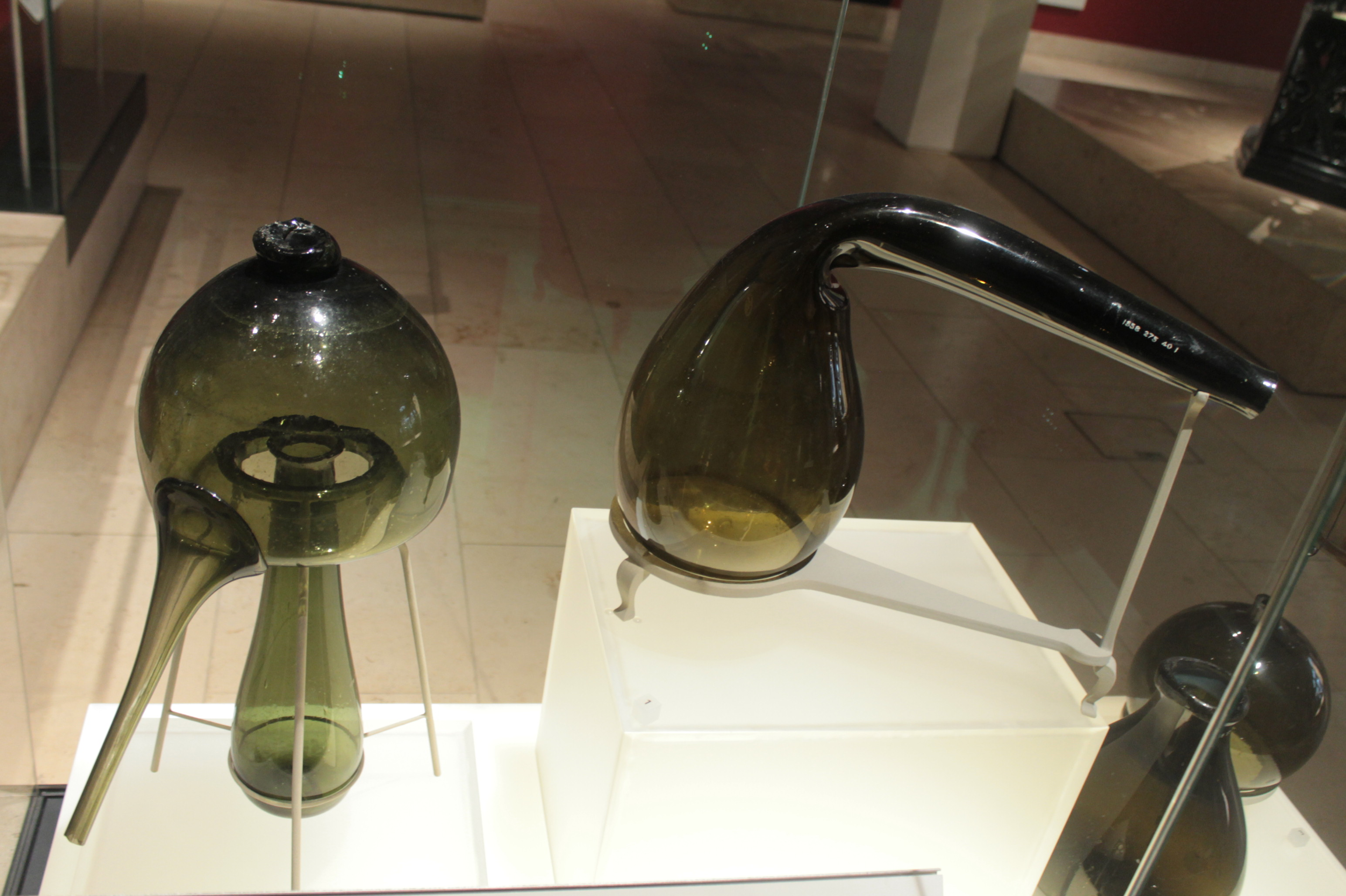
Alembics owned by Joseph Black, National Museum of Scotland
