= Barkla (crater) =

Lunar impact crater

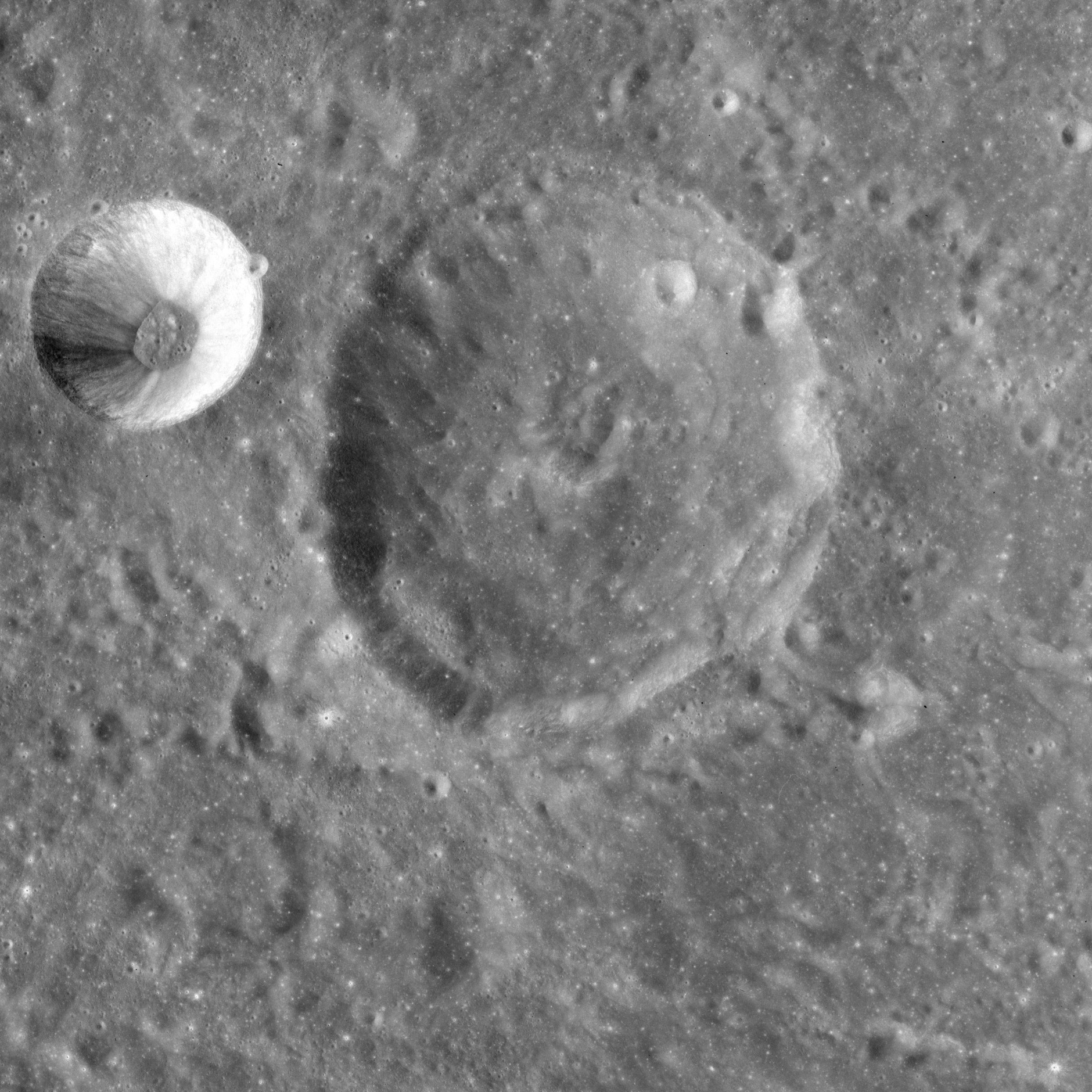
- Barkla (upper center) from Apollo 15. The smaller, brighter crater at upper left is Langrenus M. NASA photo.
- Coordinates: 10.7°S 67.2°E
- Diameter: 40.90 km (25.41 mi)
- Depth: Unknown
- Colongitude: 293° at sunrise
- Eponym: Charles G. Barkla

Barkla is a lunar impact crater that lies near the eastern limb of the Moon. It is located to the east of the prominent crater Langrenus. Due east of Barkla is Kapteyn, a formation only slightly larger with a similar size. Southwest of Barkla is the crater Lamé.

The rim of Barkla is very nearly circular, although it is slightly elongated to the northeast and southwest. The wall shows little appearance of erosion from subsequent impacts, and is not overlain by any craterlets of note. At the midpoint of the floor is a central peak, which joins a low ridge running to the south and northeast.

This crater is named after British physicist Charles G. Barkla (1877-1944), who was the 1917 Nobel laureate in physics for his discovery of characteristic X-rays. It was formerly named Langrenus A, before its designation was officially adopted by the IAU in 1979.
