= La Pérouse (crater) =

Crater on the Moon

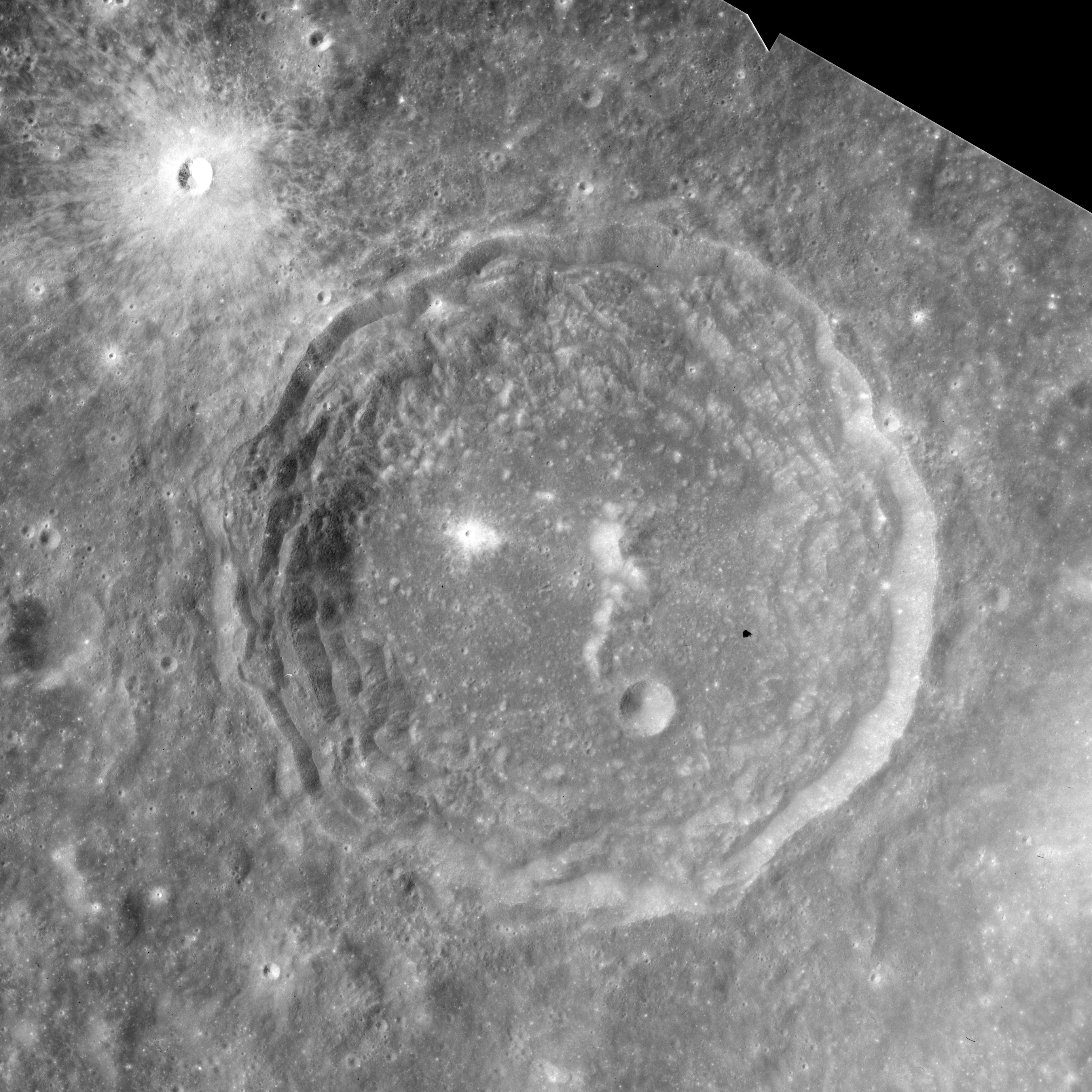
- Apollo 15 Mapping Camera image
- Coordinates: 10.67°S 76.28°E
- Diameter: 80.40 km
- Depth: 4.78 km
- Colongitude: 285° at sunrise
- Formation: Late Imbrian
- Eponym: Jean-François de La Pérouse

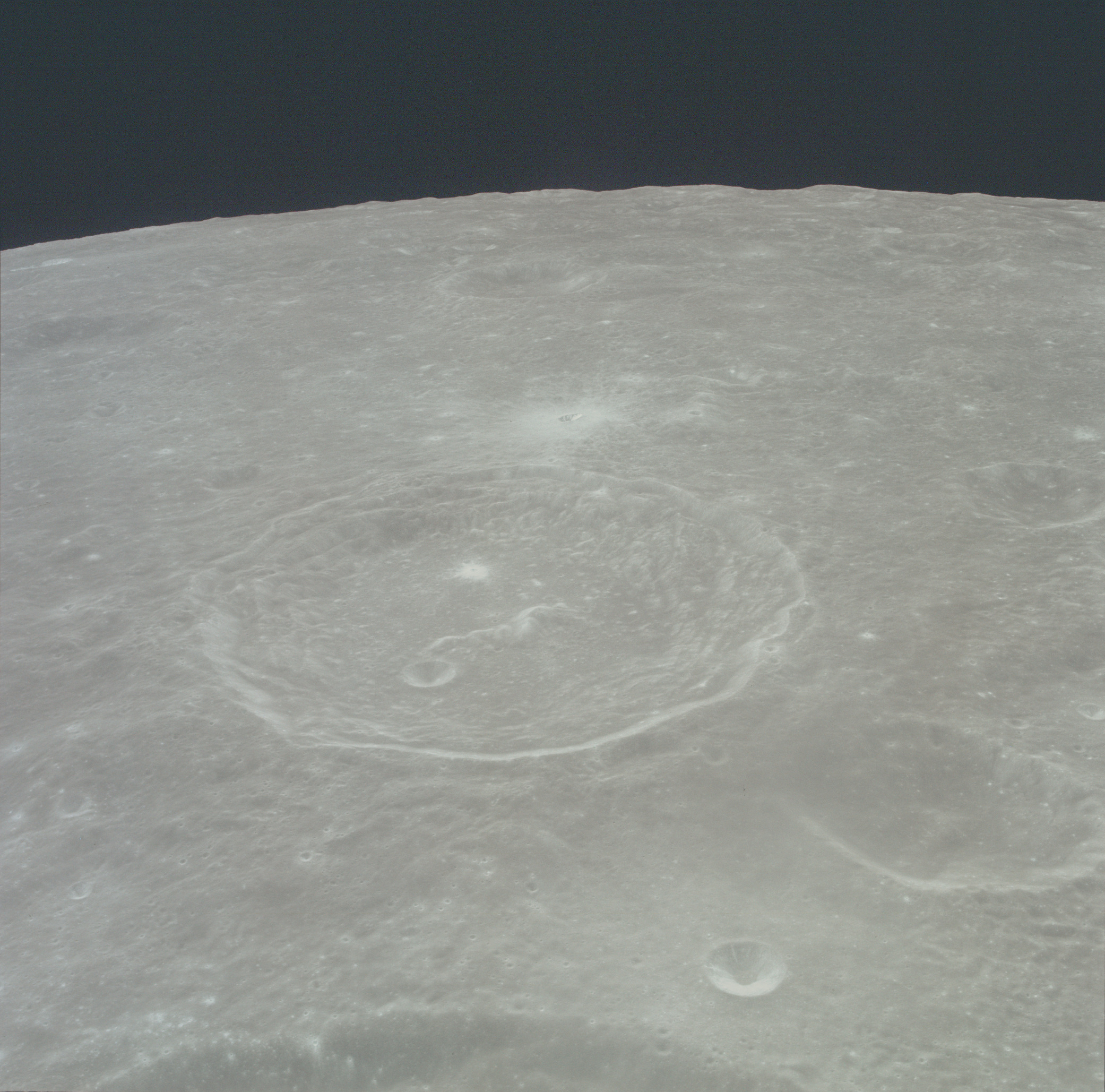
Oblique Apollo 12 image facing northwest. The small bright crater beyond the far rim is La Pérouse A, and beyond it in the central background is Von Behring

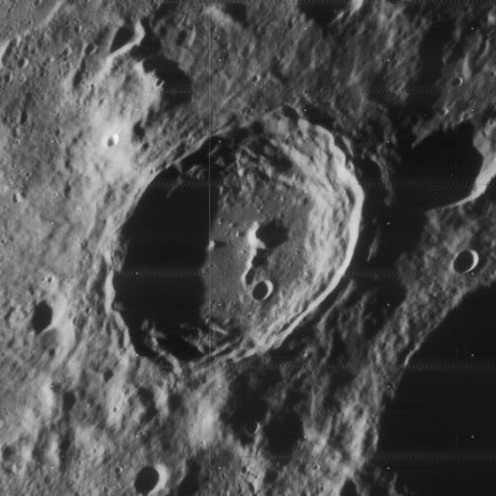
Oblique Lunar Orbiter 4 image, with a much lower sun angle

La Pérouse is a lunar impact crater that is located near the eastern limb of the Moon. It lies northwest of the larger crater Ansgarius, and to the east of Kapteyn. This crater appears foreshortened due to its location, but the rim is nearly circular when viewed from orbit.

This formation dates to the Late Imbrian period on the lunar geologic timescale. The rim of La Pérouse is not significantly worn by subsequent impacts, and its features are well-defined. Terraces line much of the inner wall, and there is a small outer rampart. There are also small outward bulges in the rim to the south-southeast and south-southwest. Within the interior floor is a central ridge offset to the northeast of the midpoint, and this formation is somewhat elongated to the southeast. There is a small crater (La Pérouse D) in the southeastern part of the floor.

The crater's name was approved by the IAU in 1935. The name is sometimes spelled 'La Peyrouse'.

== Satellite craters ==
By convention these features are identified on lunar maps by placing the letter on the side of the crater midpoint that is closest to La Pérouse.

La Pérouse	Latitude	Longitude	Diameter
A	9.3° S	74.7° E	4 km
D	11.2° S	76.6° E	7 km
E	10.2° S	78.5° E	34 km

The small but bright La Pérouse A is surrounded by a ray system (higher albedo ejecta). D lies at the south tip of the central peak, and E is a subdued crater to the east.

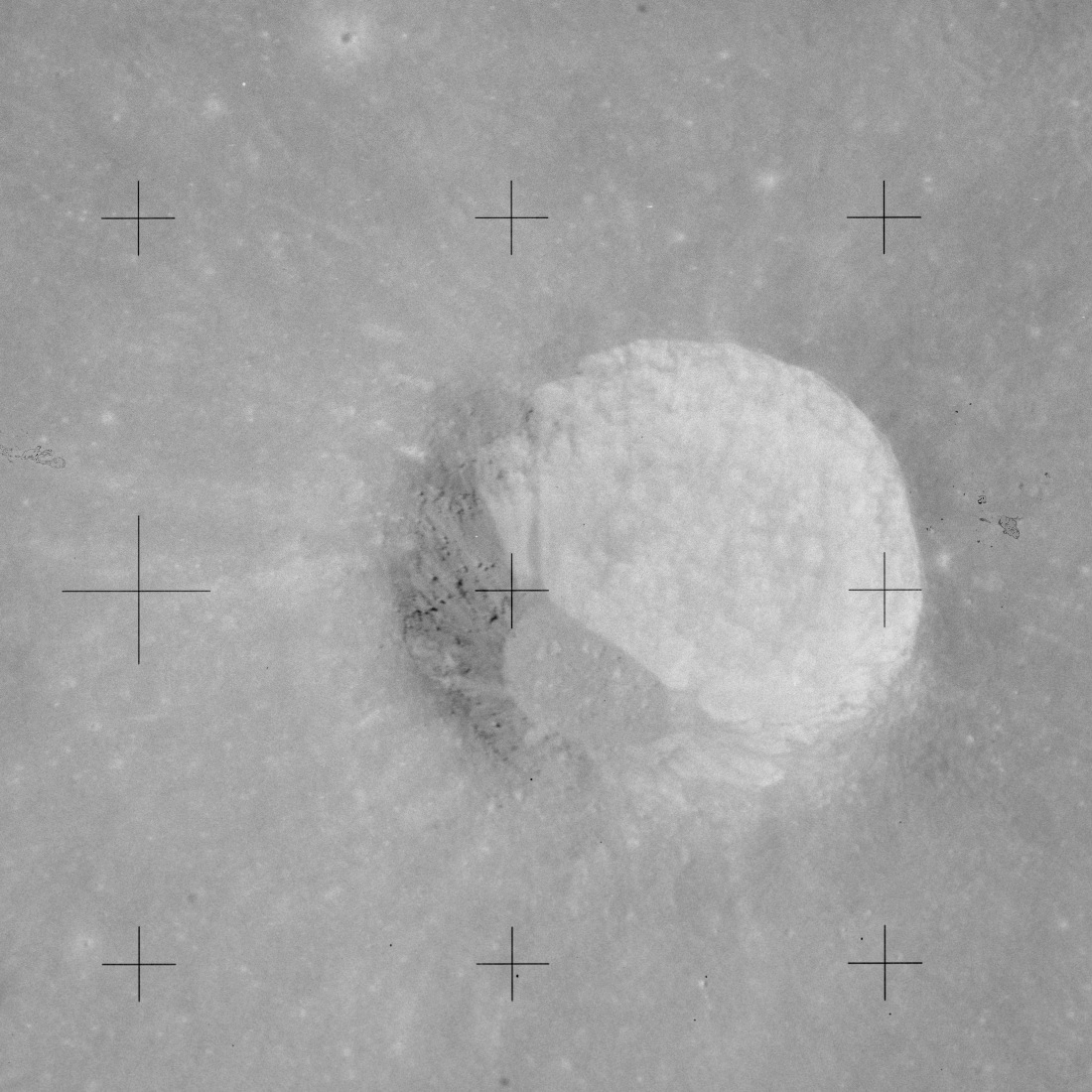
La Pérouse A, from Apollo 15

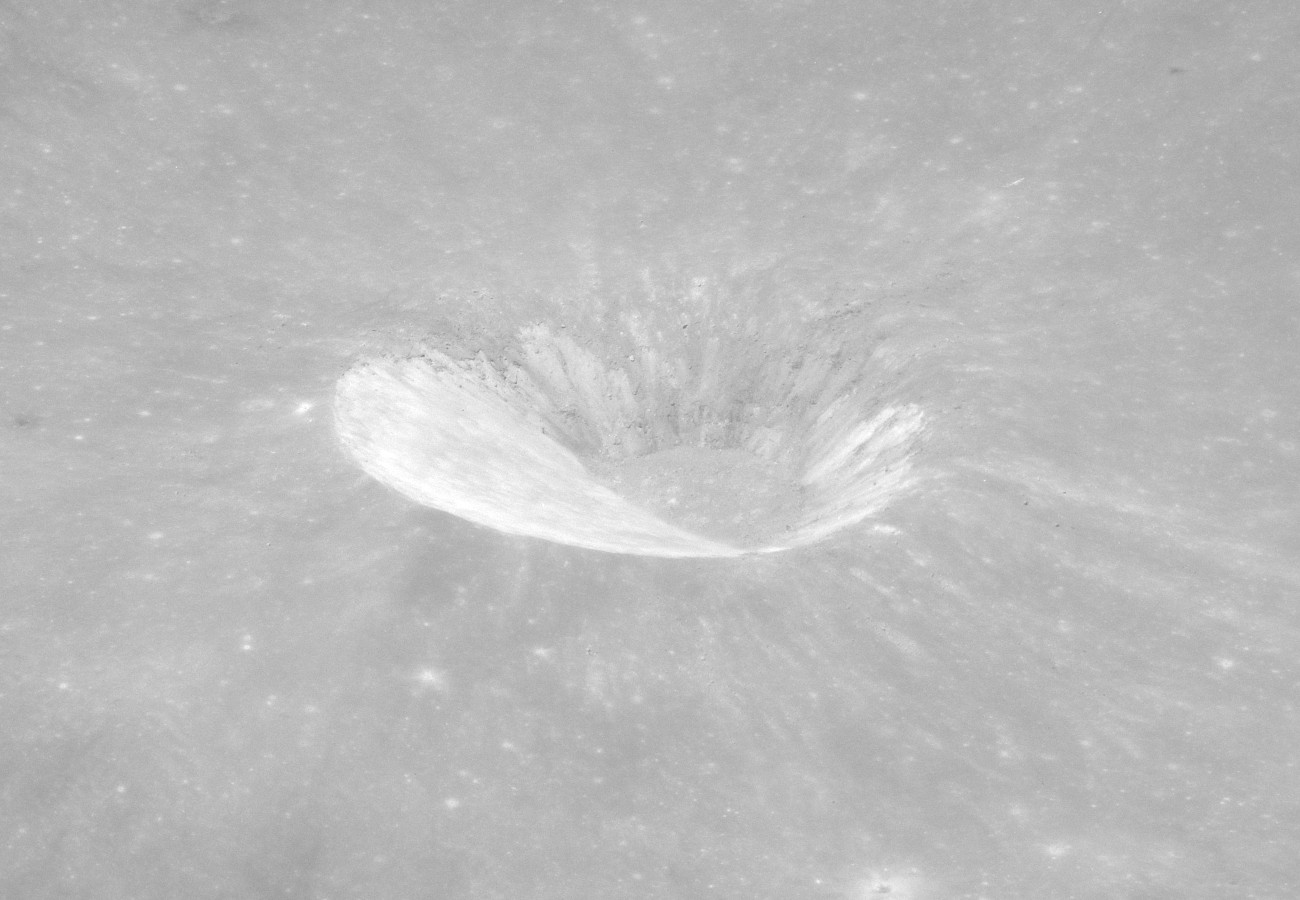
La Pérouse A, from Apollo 16
