= Charles Barkla =

British physicist (1877–1944)

Charles Barkla FRS FRSE
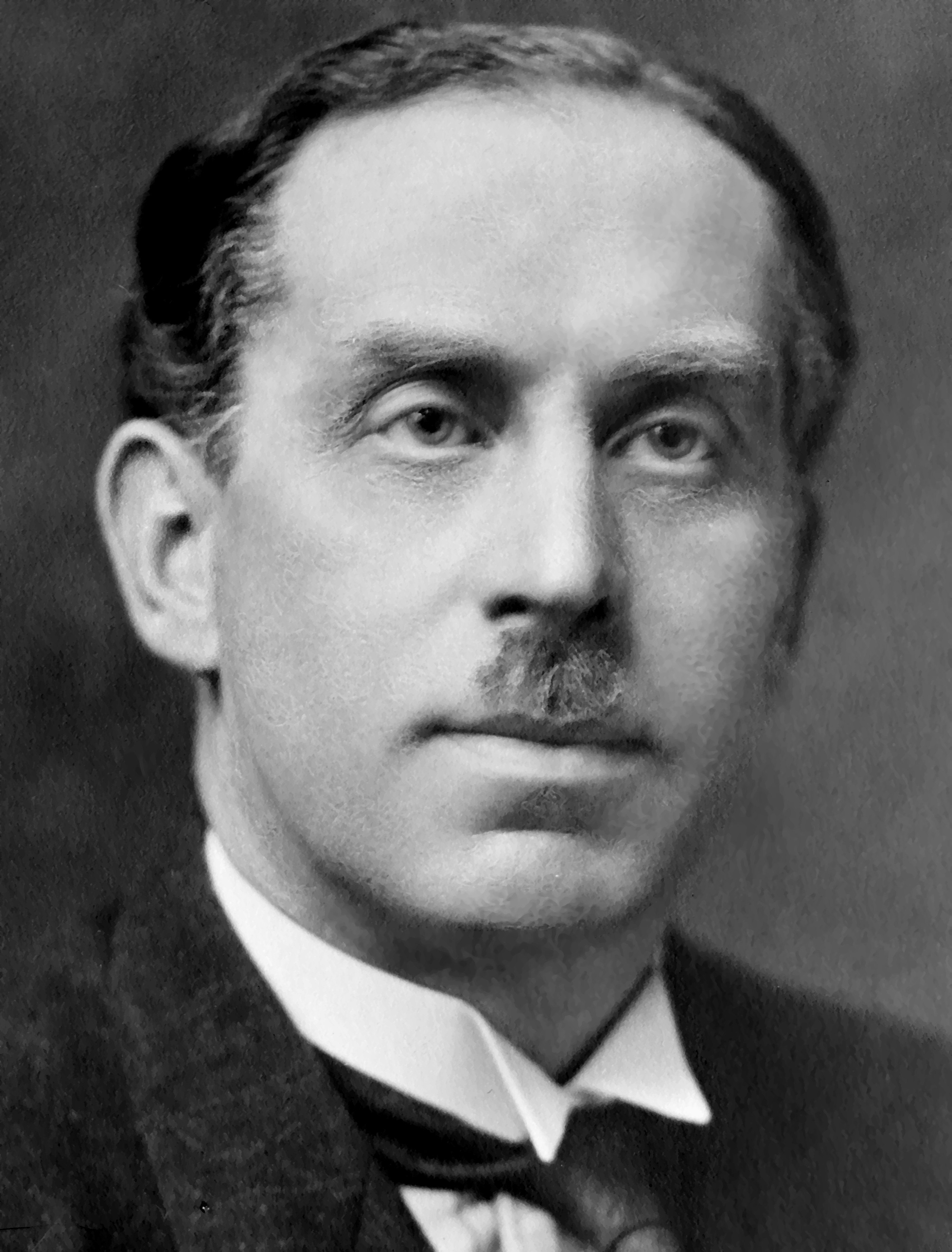
- Born: Charles Glover Barkla; 7 June 1877; Widnes, England
- Died: 23 October 1944 (aged 67); Edinburgh, Scotland
- Education: University College Liverpool (BSc, MSc); Trinity College, Cambridge; King's College, Cambridge
- Known for: Discovery of characteristic X-rays
- Spouse: Mary Esther Cowell (m. 1907)
- Children: 3
- Awards: Nobel Prize in Physics (1917); Hughes Medal (1917)
- Scientific career
- Fields: Physics
- Workplaces: University of Liverpool; University of London; University of Edinburgh
- Academic advisors: Oliver Lodge; J. J. Thomson
- Doctoral students: Marion Ross

Charles Glover Barkla (7 June 1877 – 23 October 1944) was a British physicist who received the Nobel Prize in Physics in 1917 for his discovery of characteristic X-rays.

== Biography ==
=== Education ===
Charles Glover Barkla was born on 7 June 1877 in Widnes, Lancashire, England, the son of Sarah (née Glover) and John Martin Barkla, Secretary of the Atlas Chemical Company. Barkla studied at the Liverpool Institute, and then proceeded to University College Liverpool (now the University of Liverpool) in 1894 with a County Council Scholarship and a Bibby Scholarship. He initially studied mathematics, but later specialised in physics under Oliver Lodge. During the absence of Lodge due to ill health, Barkla replaced him in lectures. In 1898, he graduated with first-class honours in Physics, and received a master's degree the following year.

In 1899, Barkla was admitted to Trinity College, Cambridge, with an 1851 Research Fellowship to study under J. J. Thomson in the Cavendish Laboratory. During his first two years at Cambridge, under the direction of Thomson, he studied the velocity of electromagnetic waves along wires of different widths and materials. After a year and a half at Trinity College, his love of music led him to transfer to King's College, Cambridge, in order to sing in its choir. His voice was of remarkable beauty and his solo performances were always fully attended.

=== Career ===
In 1902, Barkla returned to the University of Liverpool as an Oliver Lodge Fellow. In 1909, he succeeded Harold Albert Wilson as Wheatstone Professor of Physics at the University of London. In 1913, Barkla was appointed Professor of Natural Philosophy at the University of Edinburgh, where he remained until his death.

== Research ==
In 1903, Barkla studied secondary X-rays from gases radiated by other X-rays, developing a new experimental setup. This topic was relevant to the question of whether X-rays were indeed a type of electromagnetic radiation as many physicists suspected, because Lionel Wilberforce proposed to use these secondary rays to generate tertiary ones and prove the existence of polarisation by rotating the detecting part of his experimental apparatus. Tertiary radiation was too feeble to measure, so he assembled a slightly different setup. Using his new setup, he was able to prove that X-rays can indeed be polarised and are therefore electromagnetic. He published a brief summary of his findings in Nature in March 1904 and a more detailed account in the Philosophical Transactions of the Royal Society in 1905.

Barkla made significant progress in developing and refining the laws of X-ray scattering, X-ray spectroscopy, the principles governing the transmission of X-rays through matter, and especially the principles of the excitation of secondary X-rays.

Barkla proposed the J-phenomenon as a hypothetical form of X-ray behaviour similar to X-ray fluorescence. However, other scientists were not persuaded that this was a different mechanism from other known effects such as Compton scattering, so the theory was not successful.

== Personal life and death ==
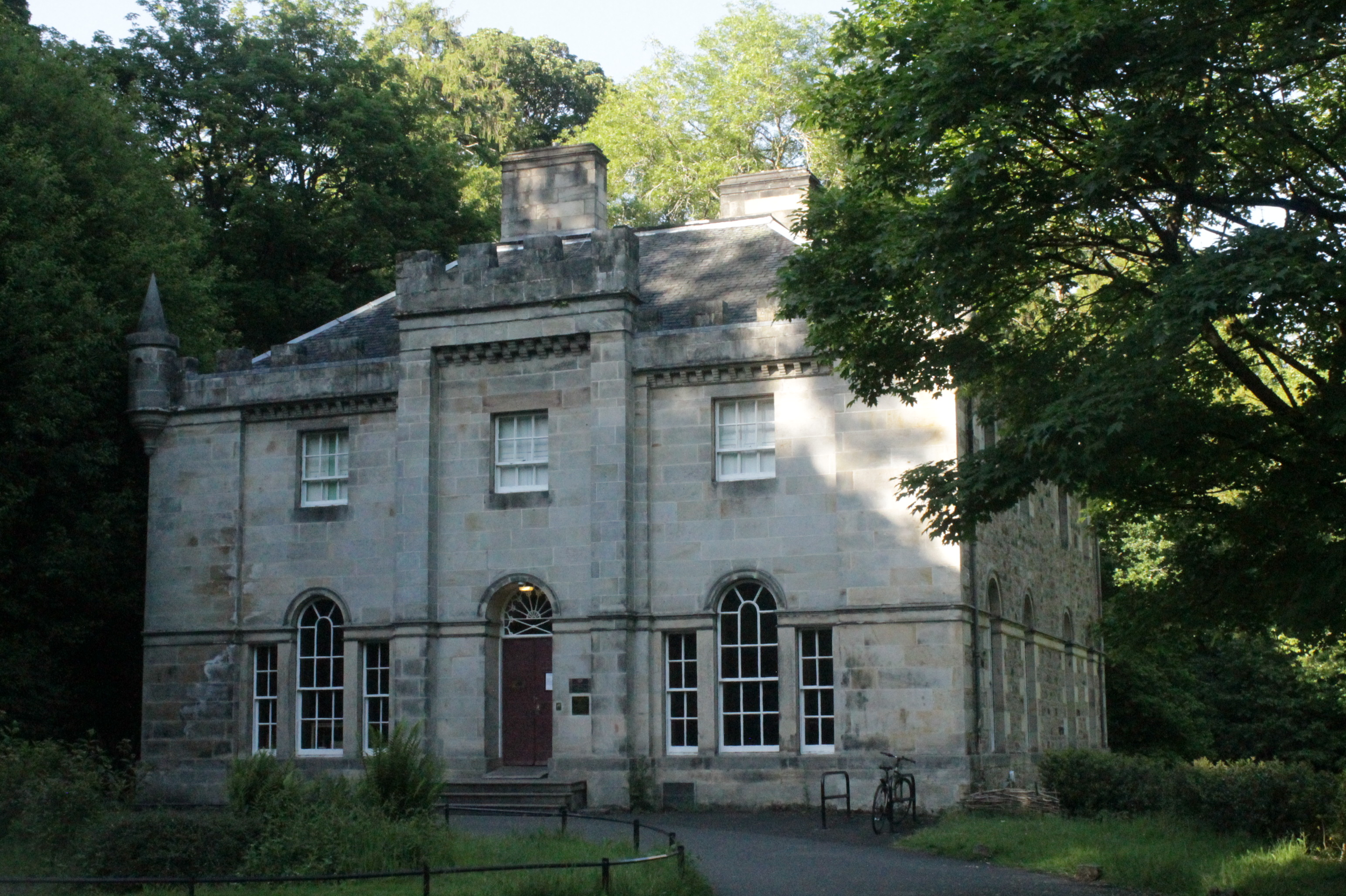
Hermitage of Braid, Edinburgh, 2002

In 1907, Barkla married Mary Esther Cowell, the eldest daughter of John T. Cowell of Douglas, Receiver-General of the Isle of Man. They had two sons and one daughter.

A religious man, Barkla was a Methodist and considered his work to be "part of the quest for God, the Creator."

From 1922 to 1938, Barkla lived at Hermitage of Braid in Edinburgh.

Barkla died at his home in Edinburgh on 23 October 1944 at the age of 67.

== Recognition ==
=== Memberships ===
| Year | Organisation | Type | Ref. |
|---|---|---|---|
| 1912 | Royal Society | Fellow | |
| 1914 | Royal Society of Edinburgh | Fellow | |

=== Awards ===
| Year | Organisation | Award | Citation | Ref. |
|---|---|---|---|---|
| 1917 | Royal Swedish Academy of Sciences | Nobel Prize in Physics | "For his discovery of the characteristic Röntgen radiation of the elements." | |
| 1917 | Royal Society | Hughes Medal | "For his researches in connexion with X-ray radiation." | |

== Commemoration ==
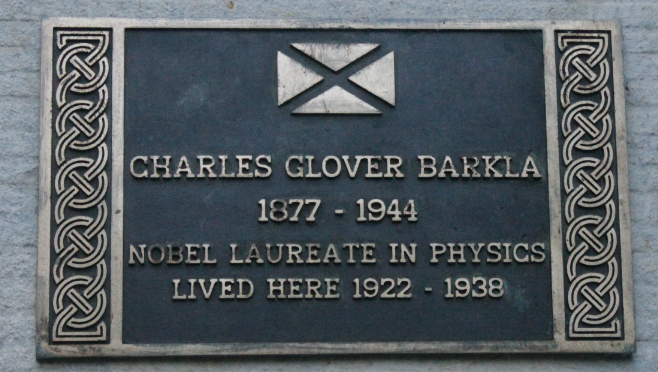
Plaque to C. G. Barkla, Hermitage of Braid

Barkla crater on the Moon is named in his honour.

A plaque was placed on Hermitage of Braid to commemorate Barkla's 16-year stay there. A plaque has also been installed in the vicinity of the Canongate, near the Faculty of Education Buildings at the University of Edinburgh.

Additionally, a lecture theatre at the University of Liverpool's Physics department, as well as a Biophysics Laboratory in the Biological Science Department, are named after him. In 2012, a gritter in Barkla's hometown of Widnes was named in his honour, following a competition run by the local newspaper. In Widnes, they have a retirement housing complex named the Barkla Fields.
