= Ansgarius (crater) =

Crater on the Moon

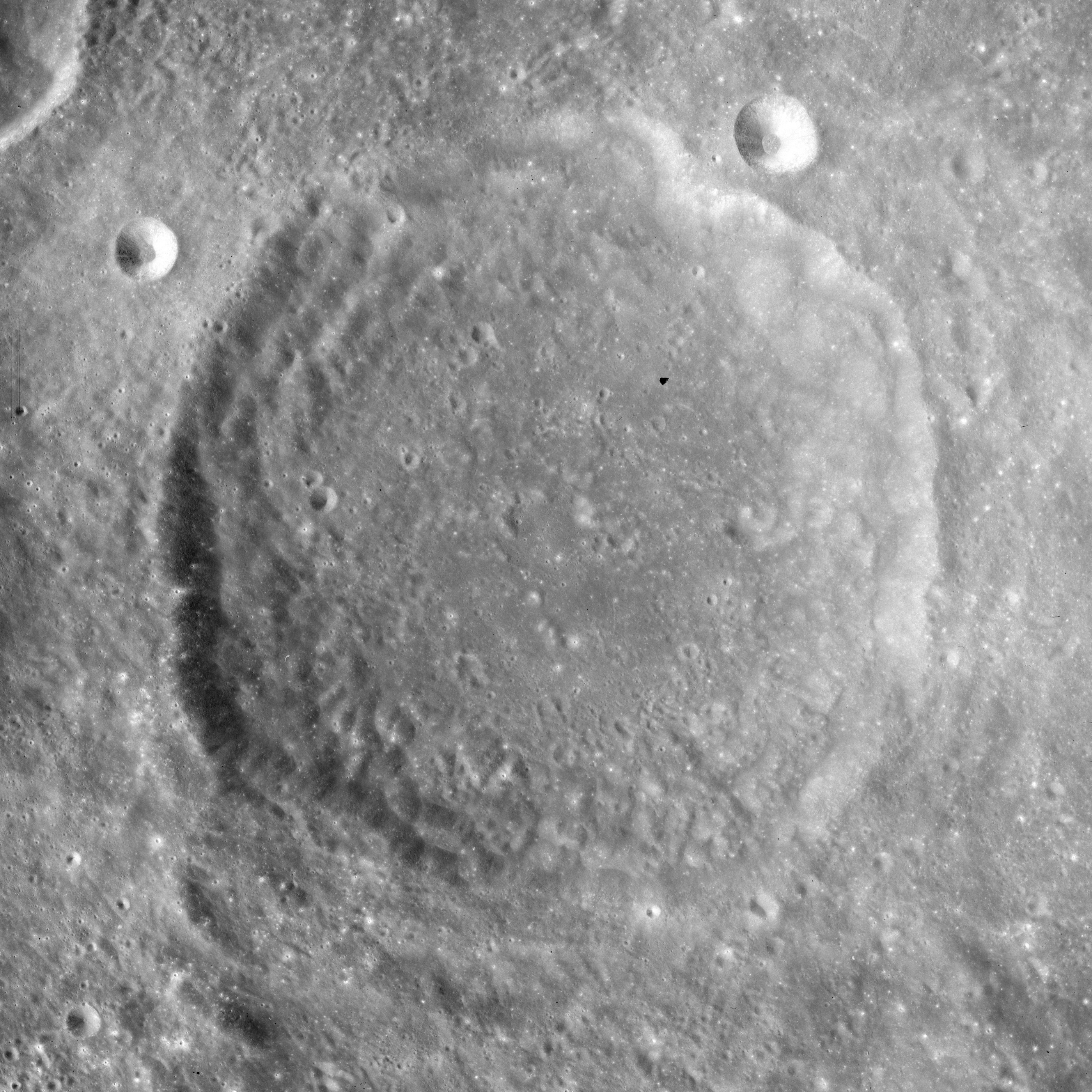
- Apollo 15 image
- Coordinates: 12.92°S 79.72°E
- Diameter: 91.42 km (56.81 mi)
- Depth: 2.2 km
- Colongitude: 181° at sunrise
- Formation: Imbrian
- Eponym: St. Ansgar

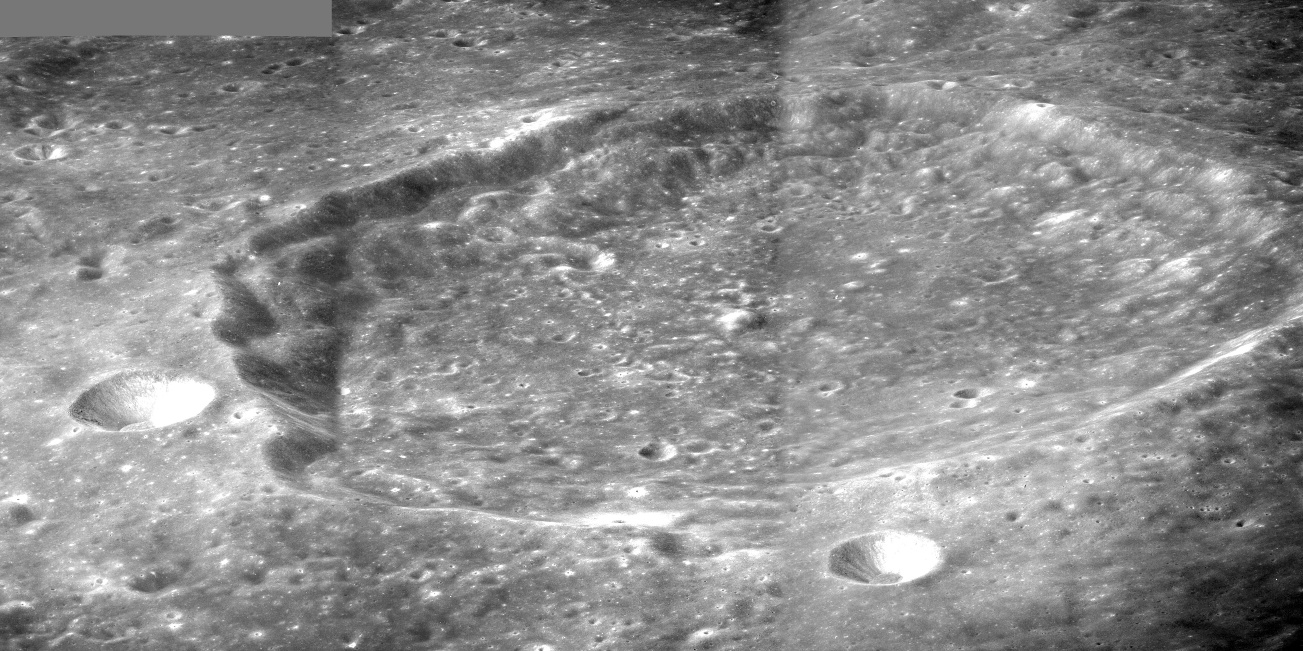
Mosaic of Apollo 8 images

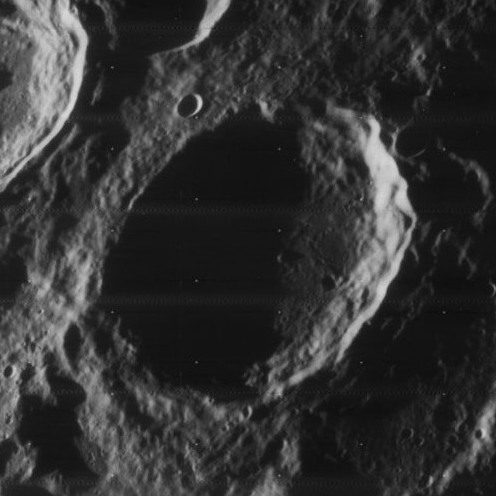
Oblique Lunar Orbiter 4 image

Ansgarius is a lunar impact crater that is located near the eastern limb of the Moon. When viewed from the Earth, the crater has a highly oval shape due to foreshortening, but the rim is actually nearly circular. To the northwest of Ansgarius is the crater La Pérouse, and south is Behaim.

This formation dates to the Imbrian period on the lunar geologic timescale. The rim of Ansgarius is not significantly worn, and has a terraced interior surface. The southwest rim appears somewhat flattened rather than round, and intrudes into an older formation of which little remains except the western rim. There is an outward notch in the north-northeastern wall. The interior floor of Ansgarius is relatively flat, with only a few hills and tiny craterlets to mark the surface.

This crater was named after the German theologian Ansgar (801-864), a 9th-century Benedictine missionary monk who brought Catholicism to northern Germany and Scandinavia, known as the "Apostle of the North". Its designation was formerly approved by the IAU in 1935. The name was introduced into lunar nomenclature by German astronomer Johann Mädler during the 19th century.

== Satellite craters ==
By convention these features are identified on lunar maps by placing the letter on the side of the crater midpoint that is closest to Ansgarius.

Ansgarius	Latitude	Longitude	Diameter
B	11.9° S	83.8° E	29 km
C	14.8° S	74.8° E	14 km
M	11.3° S	78.8° E	7 km
N	11.9° S	81.2° E	10 km
P	13.0° S	75.9° E	10 km
