= Dorsa Mawson =

Wrinkle ridge system on the Moon

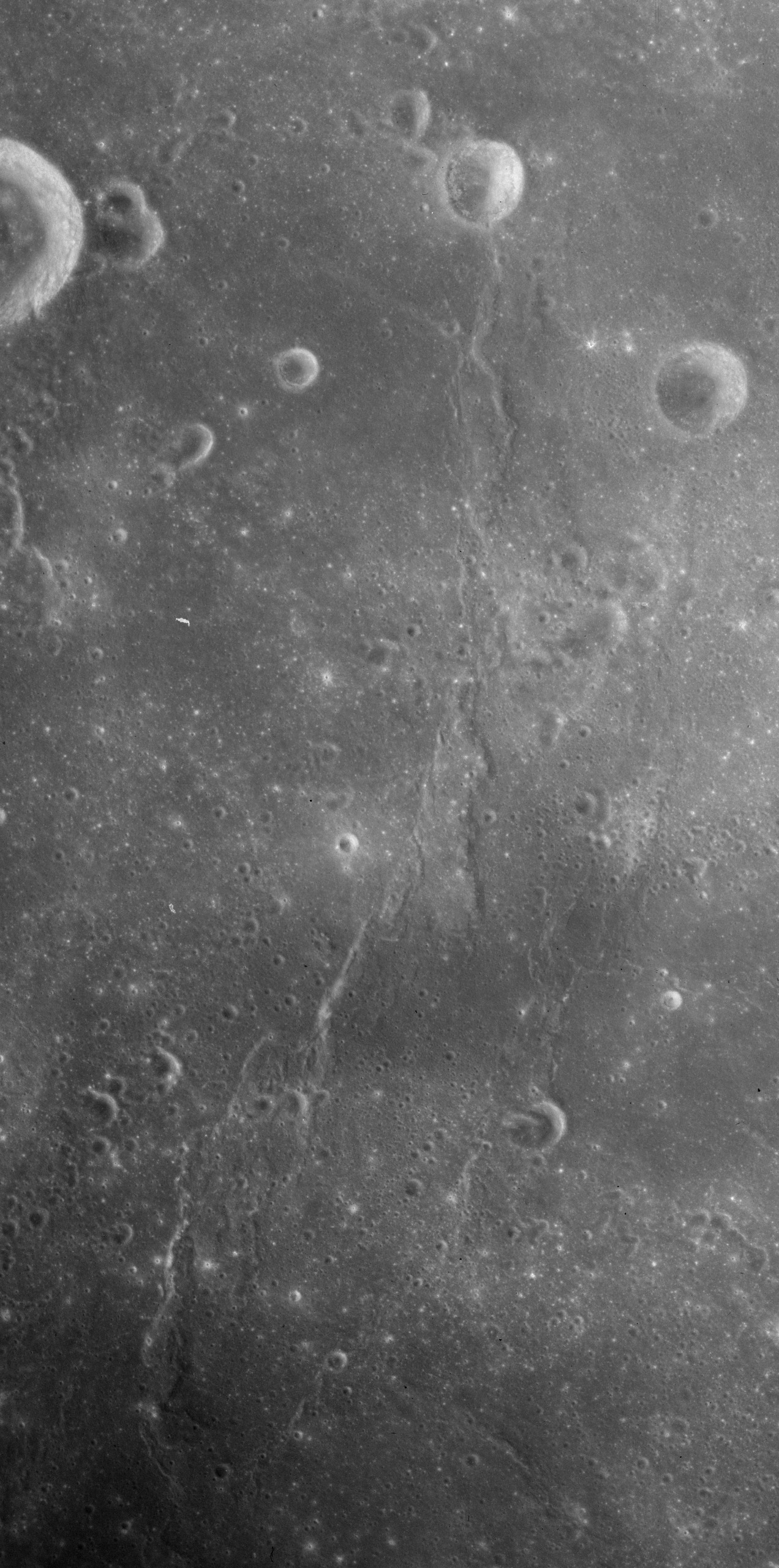
Dorsa Mawson, from Apollo 15

Dorsa Mawson is a wrinkle ridge system at 7.0°S 53.0°E in Mare Fecunditatis on the Moon. It is approximately 143 km long and was named after Antarctic explorer Douglas Mawson in 1979 by the IAU.

The southern end of the ridge is located near Crozier M crater and southeast of ibn Battuta crater. It trends roughly northeast towards some unnamed craters between Lindbergh and Bilharz craters.
