= Batuta =

Batuta may refer to:

- Bătuța, a village in Bârzava, Arad, Romania
- Batuta, Syria, village in northwestern Syria
- Ibn Batuta, (1304 – 1368 or 1369), Muslim Moroccan scholar and explorer
- Silva Batuta (born 1940), Brazilian footballer
- Henryk Batuta, a fictional person from a hoax perpetrated on the Polish Wikipedia
- Fundación Nacional Batuta, Colombian music-education system

== See also ==
- Ibn Battuta (disambiguation)
