= Ibn Battuta (disambiguation) =

Ibn Battuta, (1304 – 1368 or 1369) was a Muslim Moroccan scholar and explorer.

Ibn Battuta or other spelling variants may refer to:

- Ibn Battuta (crater), a crater on the Moon
- Ibn Battuta: The Animated Series, Malaysian animated series about travels of Ibn Battuta
- Ibn Battouta Airport, Tangier, Morocco
- Ibn Battouta Stadium, Tangier, Morocco
- Ibn Battuta Mall, Dubai, United Arab Emirates
- Ibn Battuta (Dubai Metro): Metro station in Dubai
- "Ibn-E-Batuta", a song from the 2010 Indian film Ishqiya
- "Ibn Batuta ka Juta", a nursery rhyme by Sarveshwar Dayal Saxena

== See also ==
- Batuta (disambiguation)
