= Messier (crater) =

Lunar impact crater

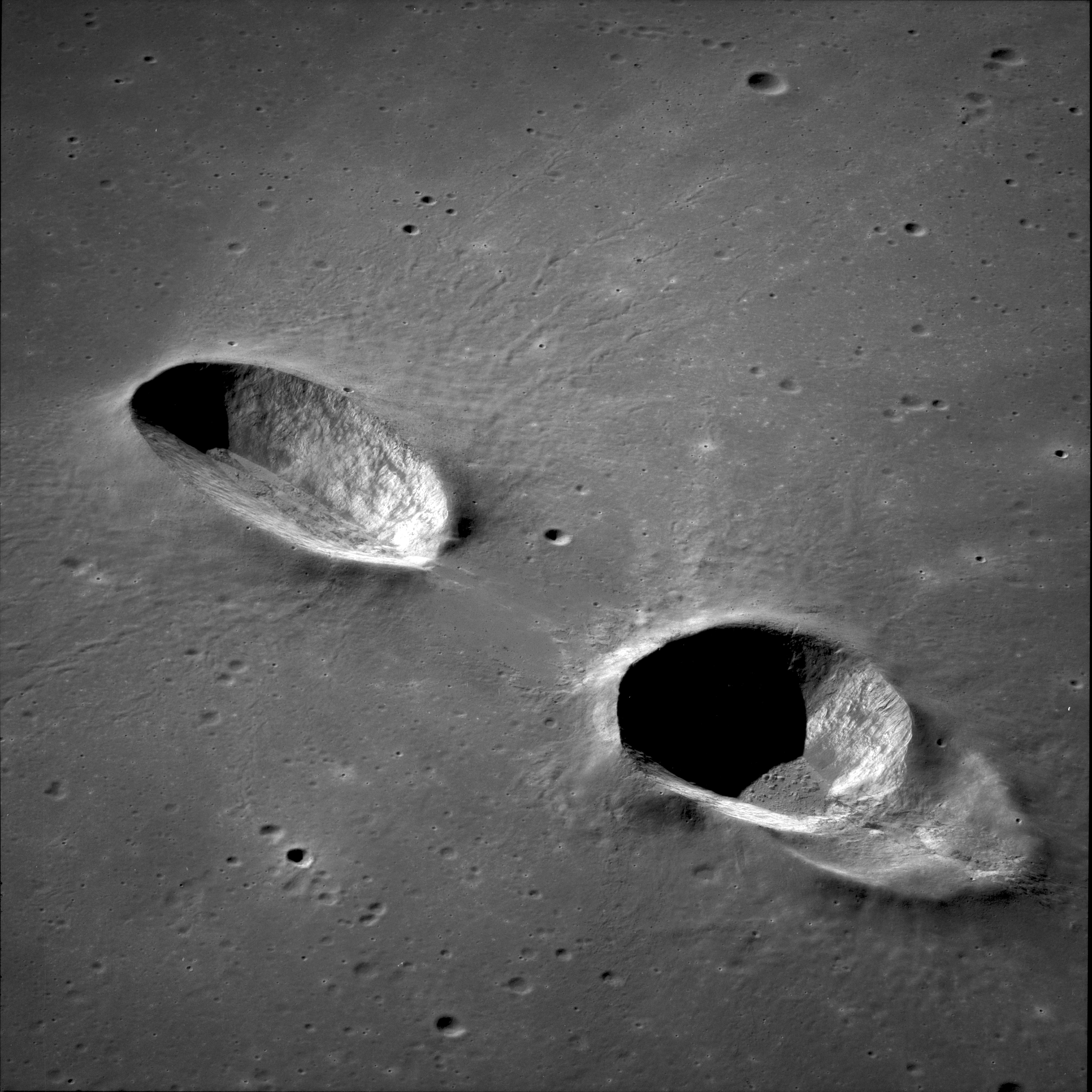
- Messier (left) and Messier A (right) from Apollo 11. NASA photo.
- Coordinates: 1.9°S 47.6°E
- Diameter: 9 × 11 km
- Depth: 1.90 km
- Colongitude: 313° at sunrise
- Formation: Copernican
- Eponym: Charles Messier

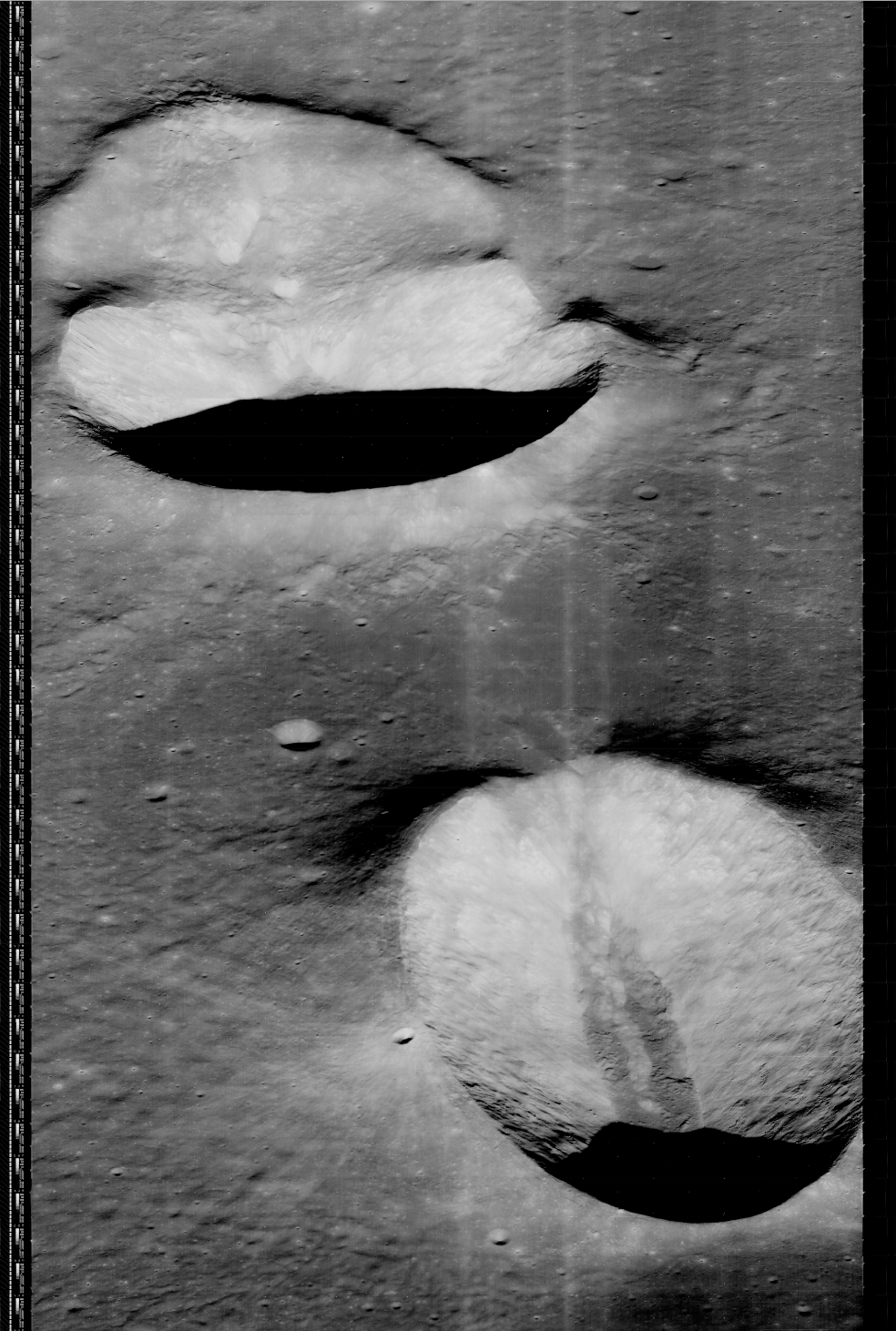
Image of Messier and Messier A, Photo Lunar Orbiter V-041H. Captured and processed by the Lunar Orbiter Image Recovery Project February, 2013

Messier is a relatively young lunar impact crater located on the Mare Fecunditatis. To Earth observers, they appear similar in size, form, depth, and brightness. The crater has a discernible oblong shape that is not caused by foreshortening. The longer dimension is oriented in an east–west direction.

Just to the west lies Messier A, a similar-sized crater with an oblong, doublet form. The longer dimension of this crater is oriented north–south, at right angles to Messier. This crater also has a curved bulge extending to the west. Messier and Messier A were photographed at high resolution by NASA's Lunar Orbiter 5 spacecraft In August 1967. The Lunar Orbiter V_041 image is archived at the Lunar and Planetary Institute website. The Lunar Orbiter V partial image shown here is derived from the Lunar Orbiter Image Recovery Project effort to reprocess these images from the original tapes.

The interiors of Messier and Messier A have a higher albedo than the surrounding mare. There is also a dark streak in the center of each crater. Two prominent, nearly linear rays extend westwards from the rim of Messier A, continuing over 100 kilometers towards the west edge of Mare Fecunditatis. The mare surface around the craters is also lightly marked by rays from other craters.

It is theorized that Messier crater was formed by an impact at a very low angle, and that Messier A could have formed following a rebound by the impacting body. The low angle of impact may also explain the asymmetrical ray system.

To the northwest of Messier A is a long, narrow rille, called Rima Messier.

This crater is named in honor of the French astronomer Charles Messier (1730–1817).

== Satellite craters ==
By convention these features are identified on lunar maps by placing the letter on the side of the crater midpoint that is closest to Messier.

Messier	Coordinates	Diameter, km
A	2.03°S 46.94°E	11.0
B	0.9°S 48.06°E	6.9
D	3.59°S 46.32°E	7.8
E	3.35°S 45.43°E	5.0
J	1.6°S 52.16°E	3.7
L	1.26°S 51.87°E	5.4

The following crater has been renamed by the IAU.

- Messier G - See Lindbergh (crater).

Messier A has been called W. H. Pickering, but this was never officially sanctioned by the IAU. A different crater has since been named for Pickering.

== Gallery ==
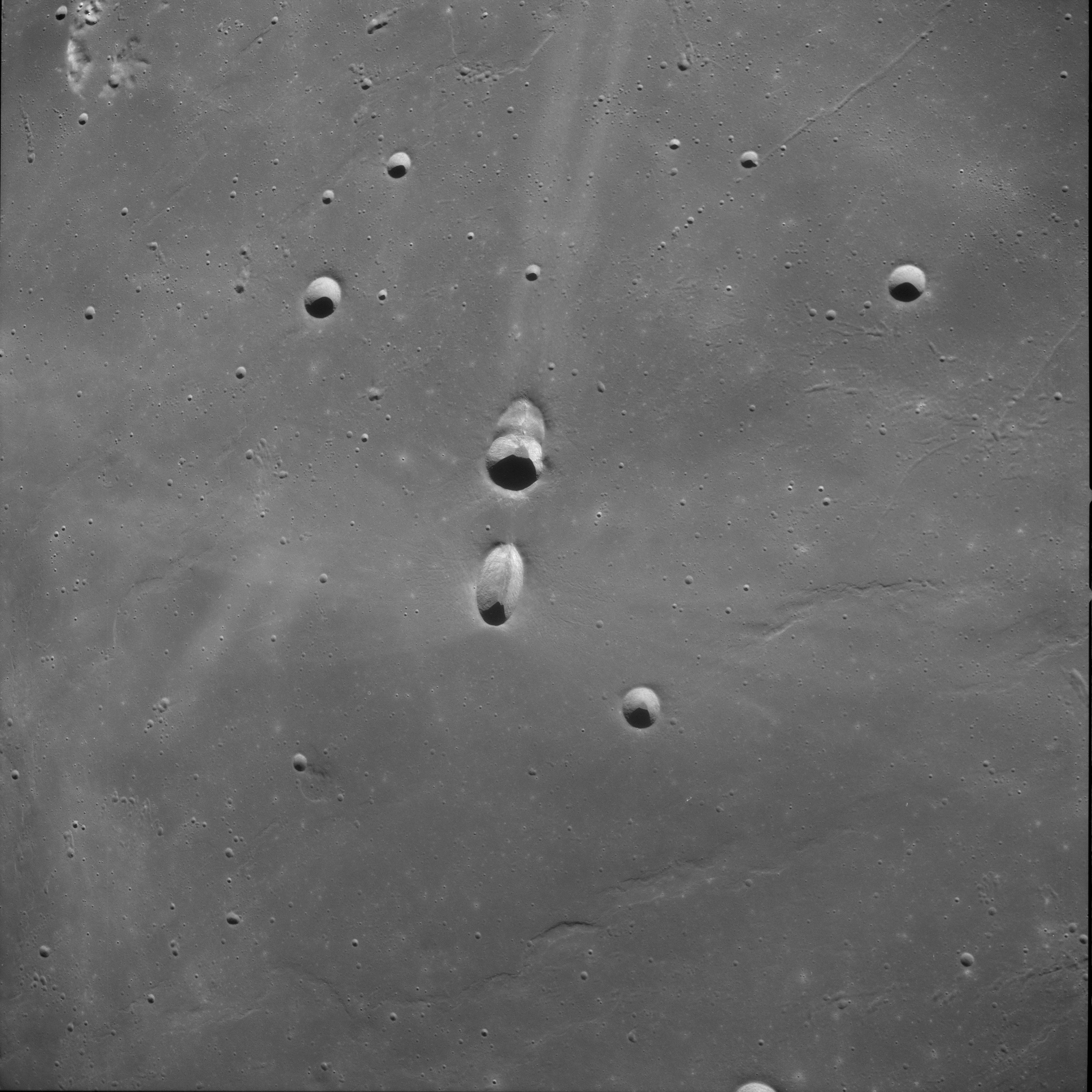
Near vertical view from Apollo 11

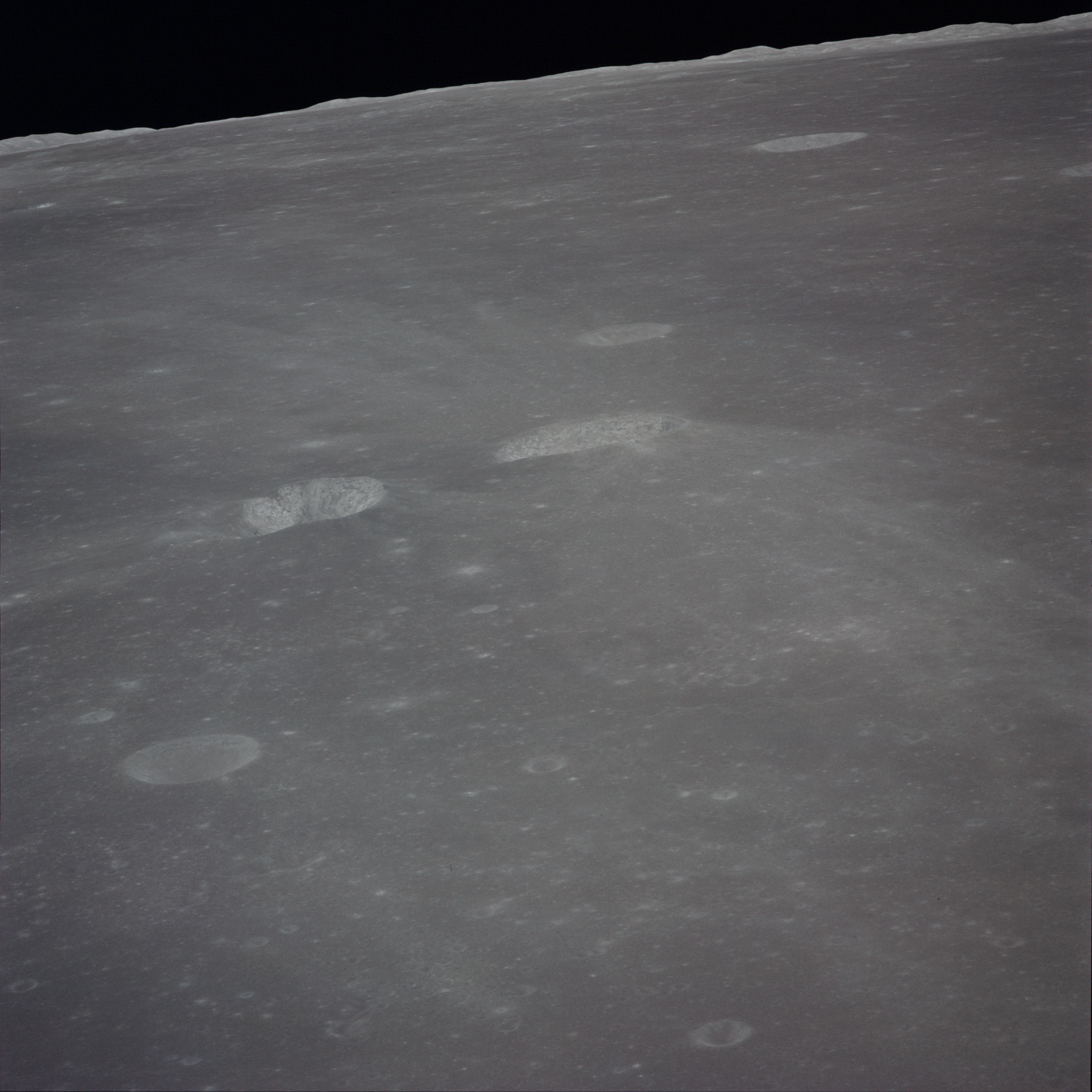
Oblique view from Apollo 14

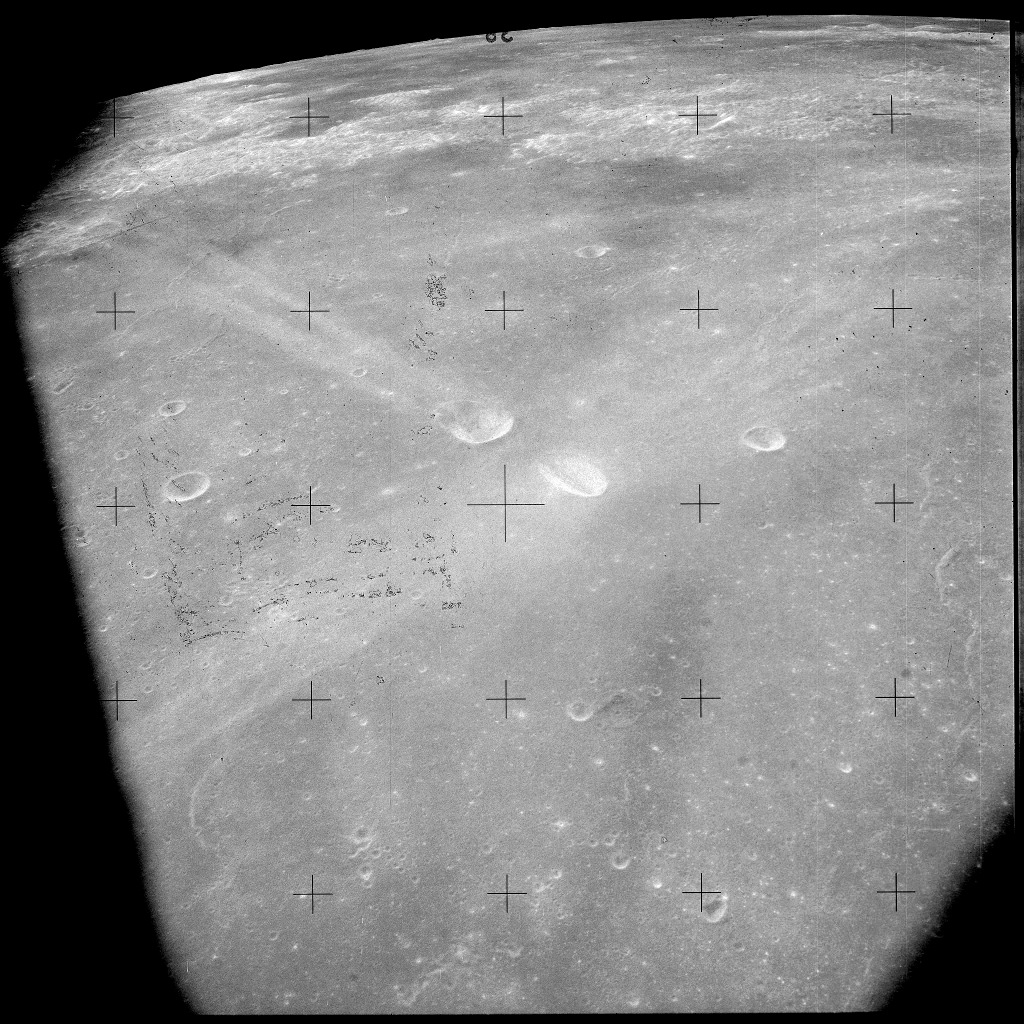
Photo taken by Apollo 15 with high Sun, showing the prominent rays.

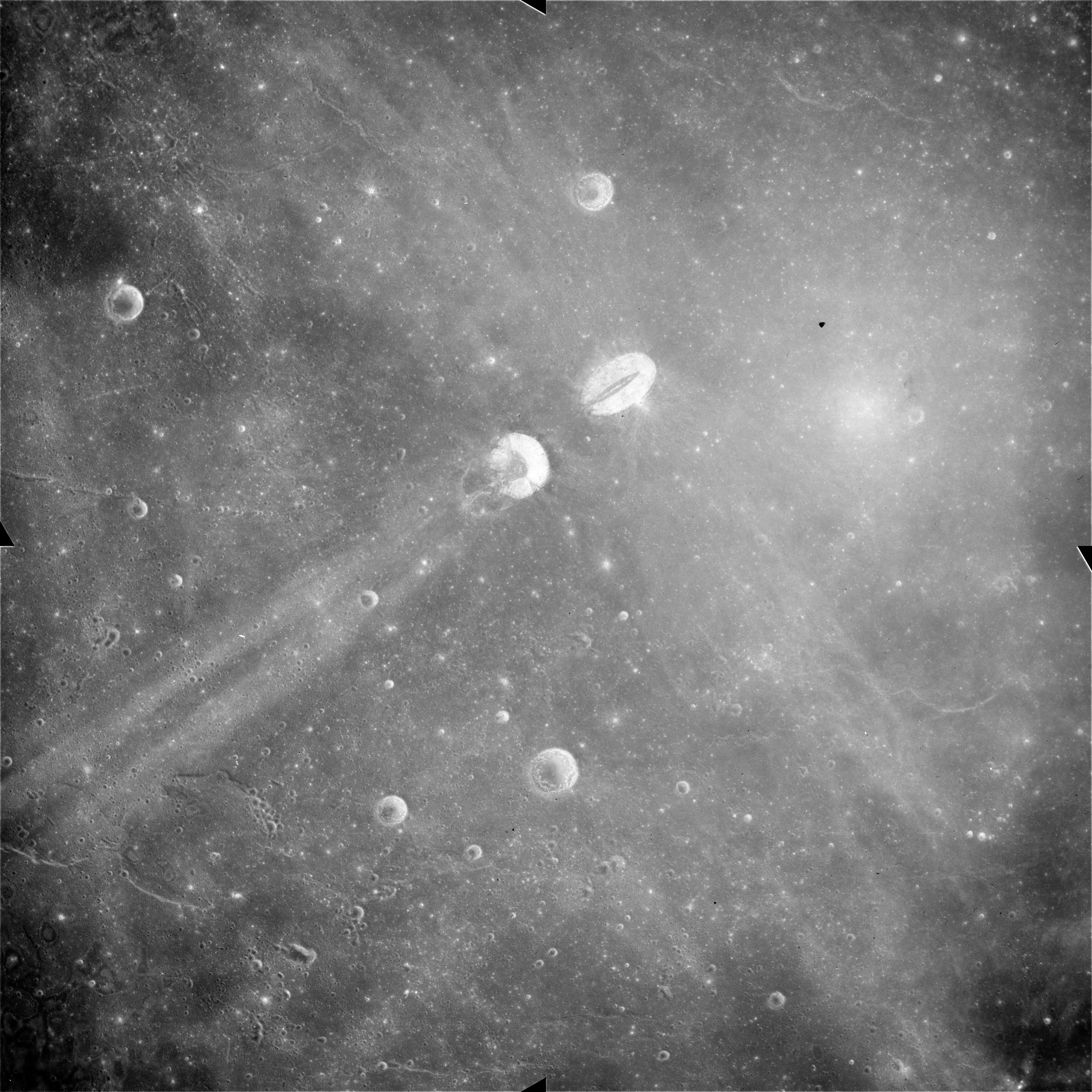
Apollo 15 Mapping Camera image

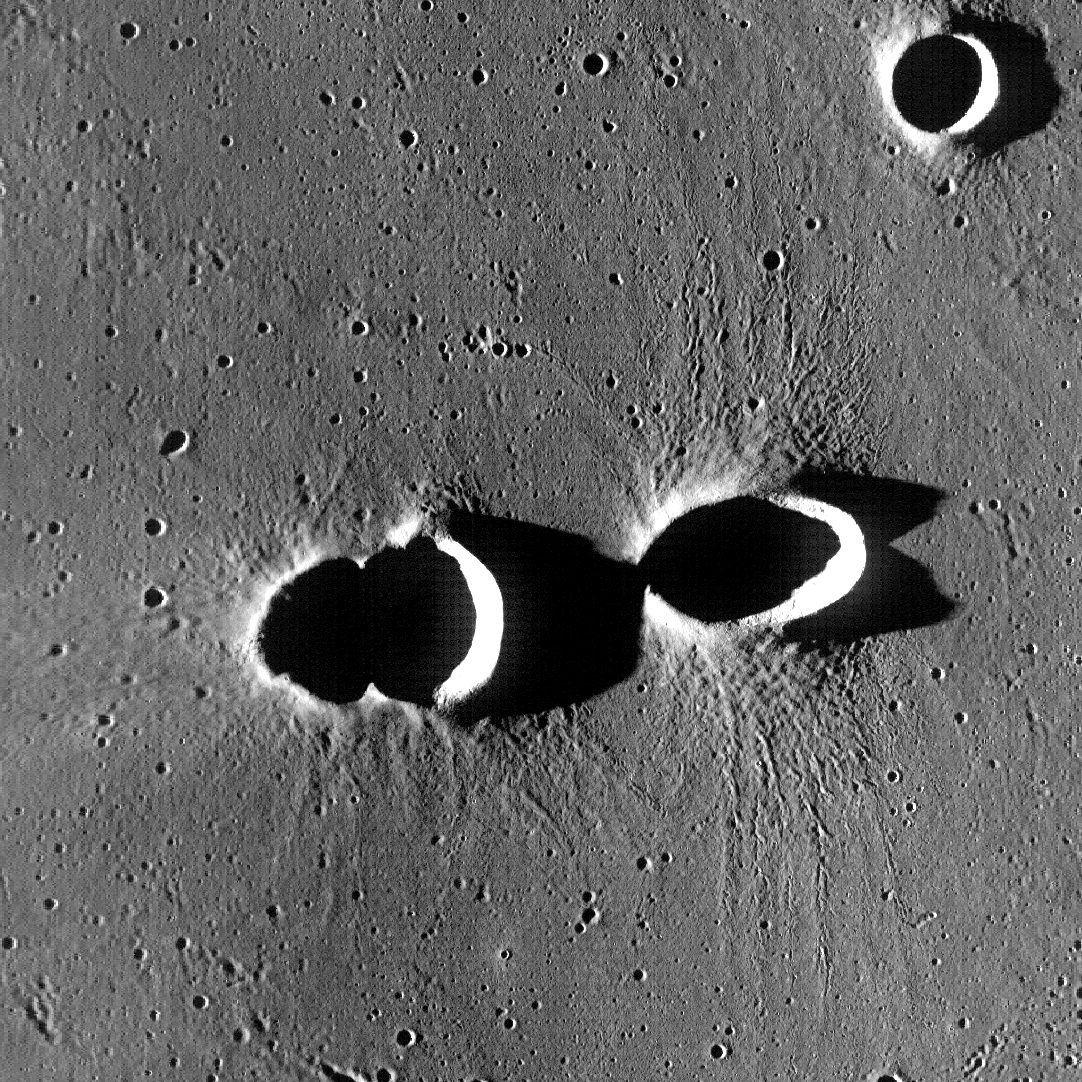
Photo taken by Lunar Reconnaissance Orbiter with low Sun, showing relief of ejecta.

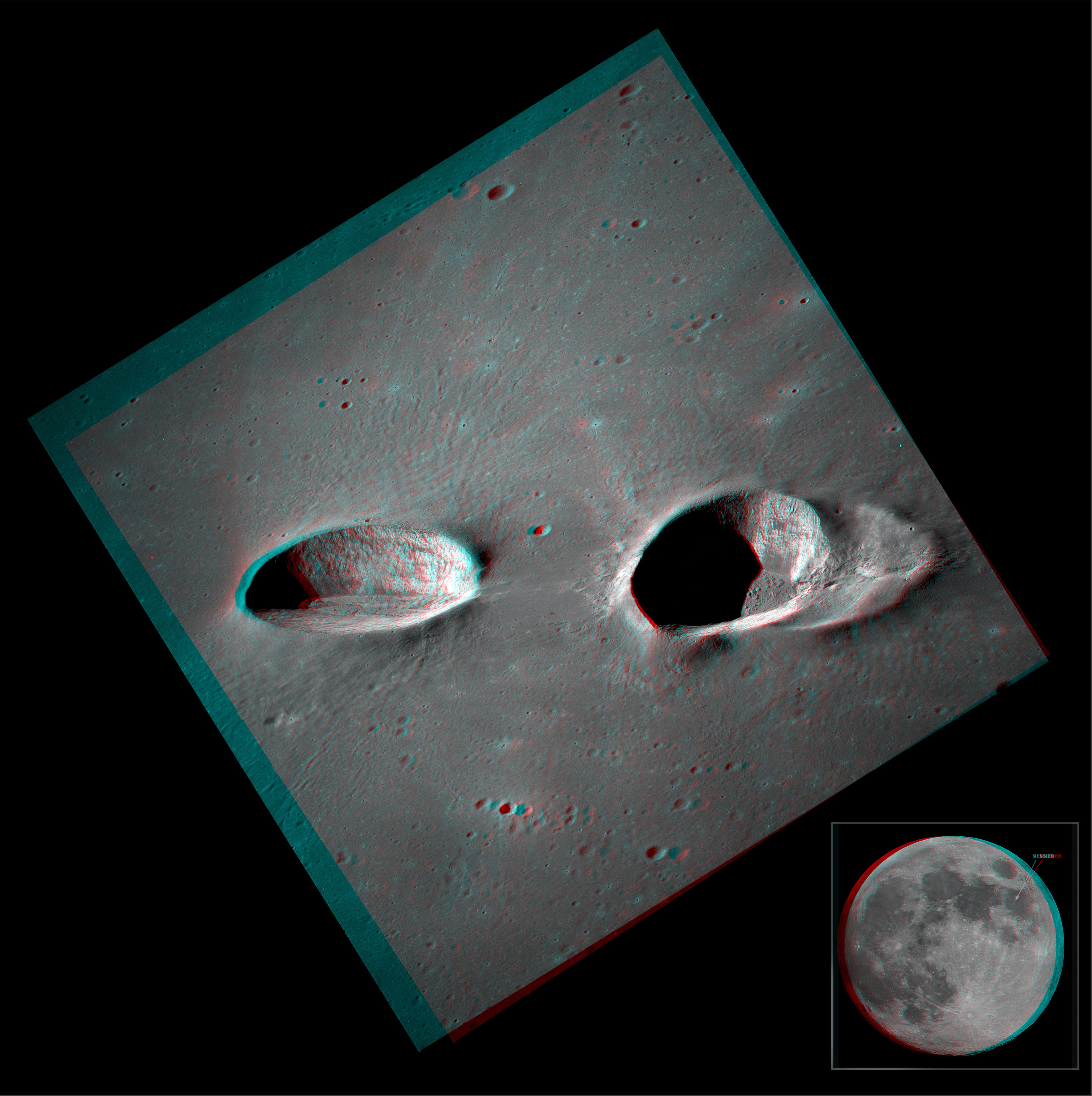
A stereo view of the craters (Apollo 11)

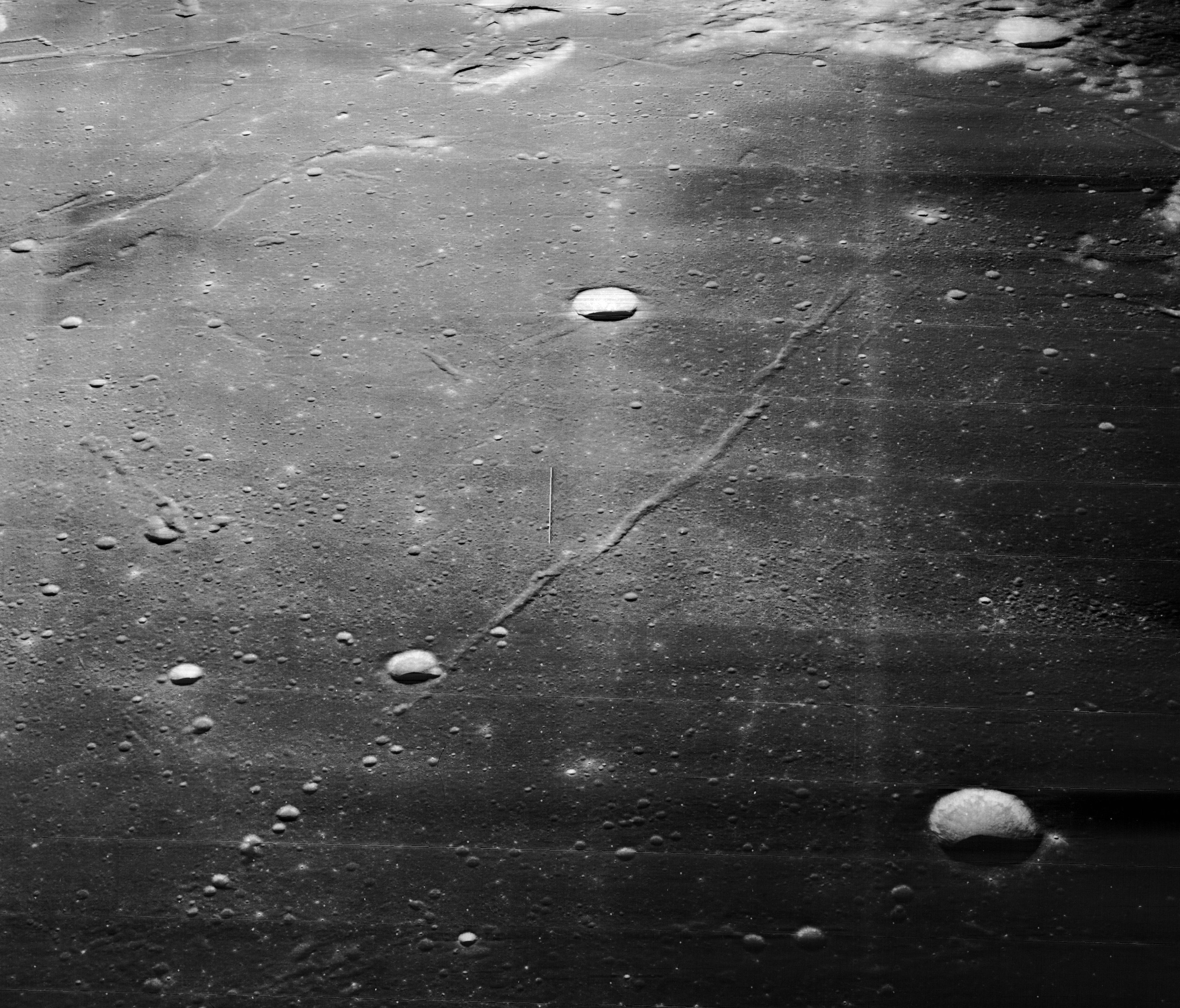
Oblique view of Rima Messier from Lunar Orbiter 5
