= Henryk Batuta hoax =

Hoax Wikipedia article

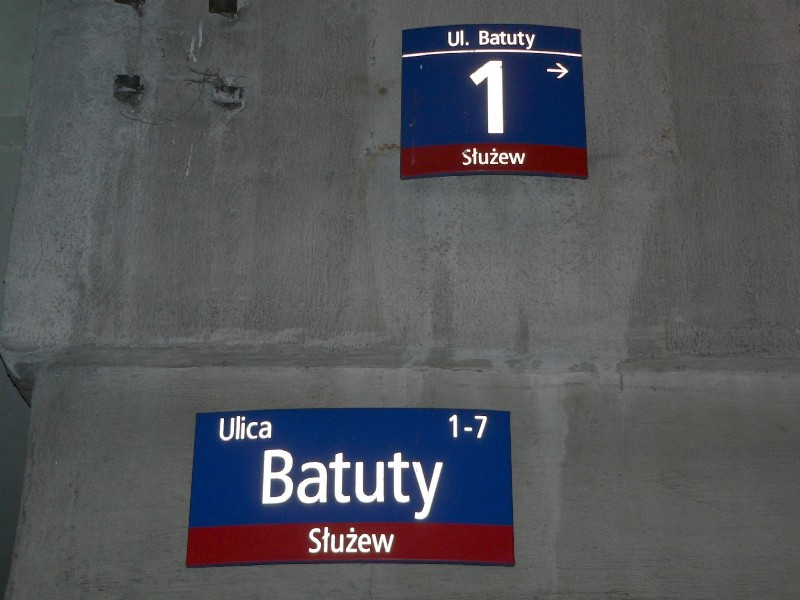
The real Batuta Street in Warsaw

Henryk Batuta was a hoax article on the Polish Wikipedia from November 2004 to February 2006, the main element of which was a biographical article about a nonexistent socialist revolutionary, Henryk Batuta.

== History ==
The perpetrators of the hoax created an article about Henryk Batuta (supposedly born Izaak Apfelbaum), a fictional socialist revolutionary and Polish communist. The fake biography said Batuta was born in Odesa, Ukraine, in 1898 and participated in the Russian Civil War. The article was created on November 8, 2004 and was exposed as a hoax 15 months later.

The article was ten sentences long while it existed on Polish Wikipedia. It gained some prominence after stories about it appeared in prominent Polish newspapers (e.g. Gazeta Wyborcza) and magazines (e.g. Przekrój), as well as a British newspaper (The Observer).

The article also falsely claimed a street in Warsaw was named "Henryk Batuta Street", after the fictional communist official. The anonymous hoaxers who created the article, according to the press calling themselves "The Batuta Army" (Polish: Armia Batuty), allegedly wanted to draw attention to the fact that there are still places in Poland named after former communist officials who "do not deserve the honour".

The hoax was exposed when the article was listed for deletion. Even after the article was exposed as a well-organized hoax, its perpetrators tried to convince others of its authenticity by providing false bibliographical information and even by uploading a doctored photograph of a street name "ulica Henryka Batuty" (Henryk Batuta Street). The mystification was "officially" exposed and confirmed on 9 February 2006, when the Polish daily Gazeta Wyborcza and weekly Przekrój published their articles about the hoax.

There is a Batuty Street (Polish: ulica Batuty) in Warsaw; however, the name comes from the Polish word "batuta", which means "(conductor's) baton". In this area of the Służew district, there are many street names relating to music and this is one of them. Streets named after a person in Warsaw always carry the first name, not only the family name, on the plate. On the street plate for Batuta, there is no first name.

== Content of the hoax article ==
The following is an English translation of the hoax article as it appeared on the Polish Wikipedia on 1 February 2006, when it was exposed as a hoax (direct link).

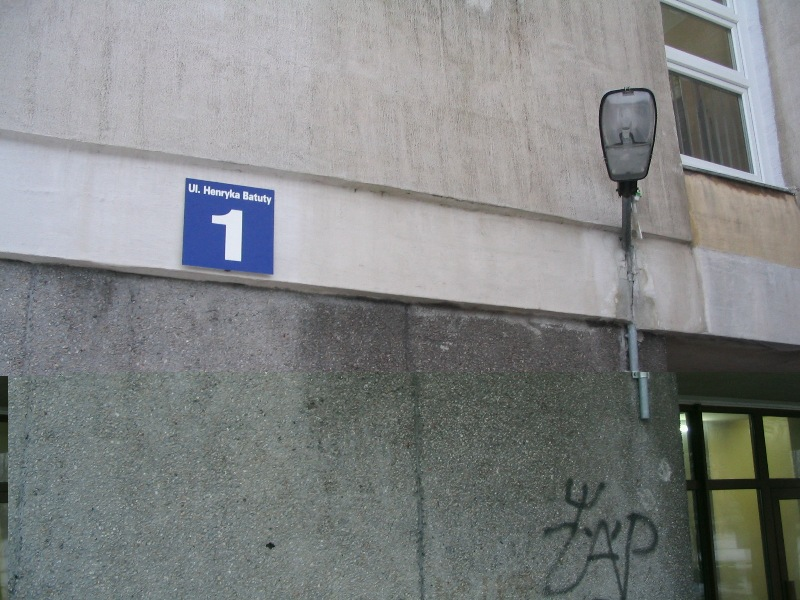
Henryk Batuta Street (fake)

Henryk Batuta, real name Izaak Apfelbaum, (born 1898 in Odesa – died 1947 near Ustrzyki Górne) was a Polish communist and an activist in the international workers' movement.

A participant of the Russian civil war, he joined the Communist Party of Poland after returning home. Enforcing party sentences, he organised assassinations of undercover political police informers; the killings were carried out by Wacław Komar, among others. Only in the fifties was this revealed. From 1934 to 1935 he was imprisoned in Bereza Kartuska, later he emigrated. He participated in the Spanish civil war. During World War II he stayed in the Soviet Union; in 1943 he joined the Union of Polish Patriots; he became the major of the Internal Security Corps. He died in 1947 near Ustrzyki Górne in a clash with the UPA.

His figure is commemorated by a street in Warsaw (Służew nad Dolinką). After 1989 many suggested renaming the street, but the name was never changed.
