= Lindbergh (crater) =

Crater on the Moon

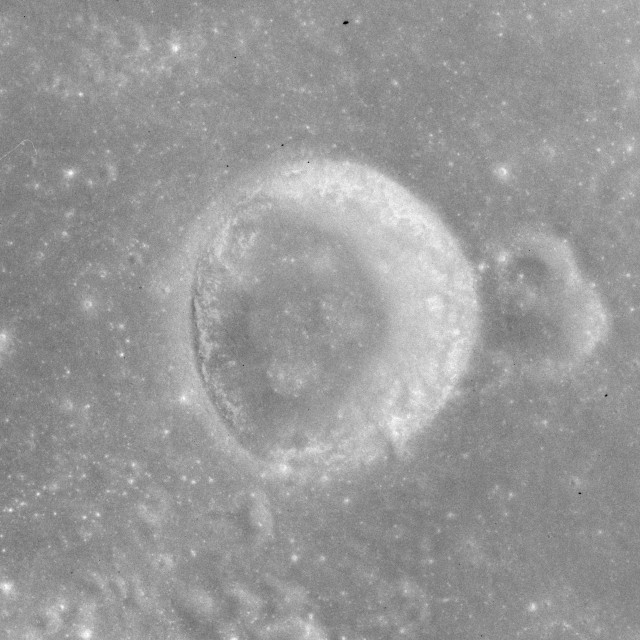
- Apollo 15 image
- Coordinates: 5.4°S 52.9°E
- Diameter: 12 km
- Depth: 1.50 km
- Colongitude: 308° at sunrise
- Eponym: Charles A. Lindbergh

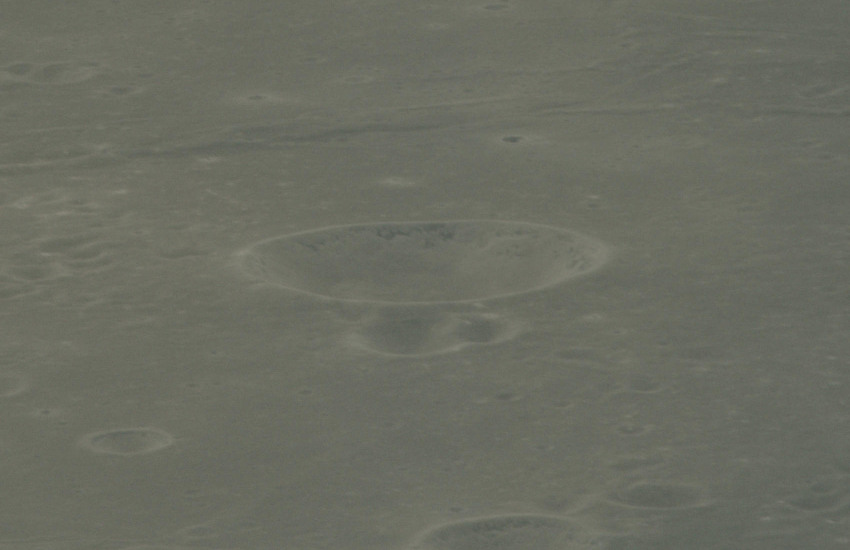
Oblique view from Apollo 15

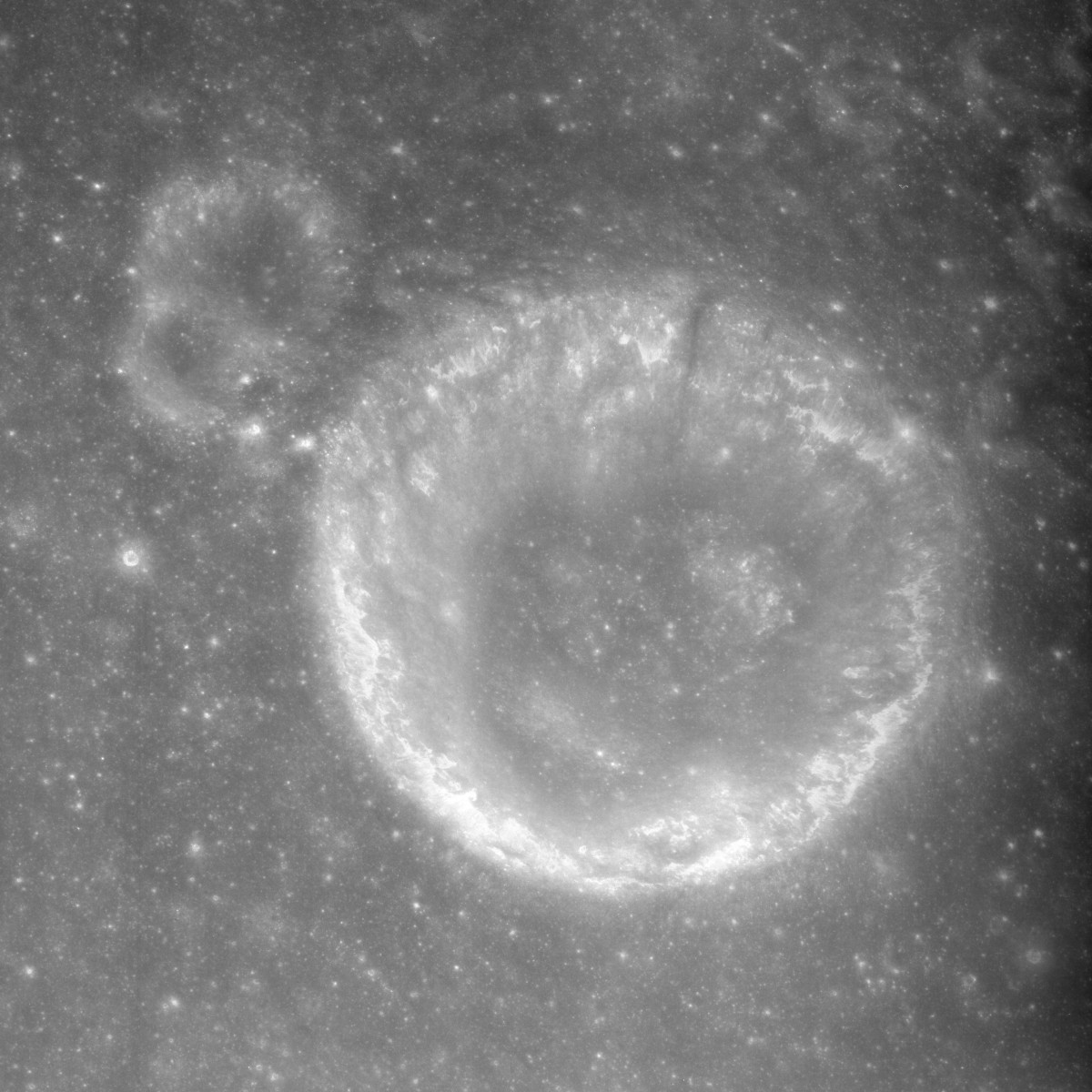
High-resolution view from Apollo 16

Lindbergh is a small lunar impact crater that is located in the western part of the Mare Fecunditatis. It lies to the west of the flooded crater Bilharz, and northeast of Ibn Battuta. Lindbergh was previously designated Messier G before being given its name by the IAU. The unusual elongated crater Messier lies about 150 km to the northwest.

This is an isolated crater that is entirely surrounded by lunar mare. It is circular and bowl-shaped, with an interior floor that is about half the diameter of the crater. The inner walls slope gently down to the floor, and lacks notable features or impacts.
