= Ibn Battuta (crater) =

Crater on the Moon

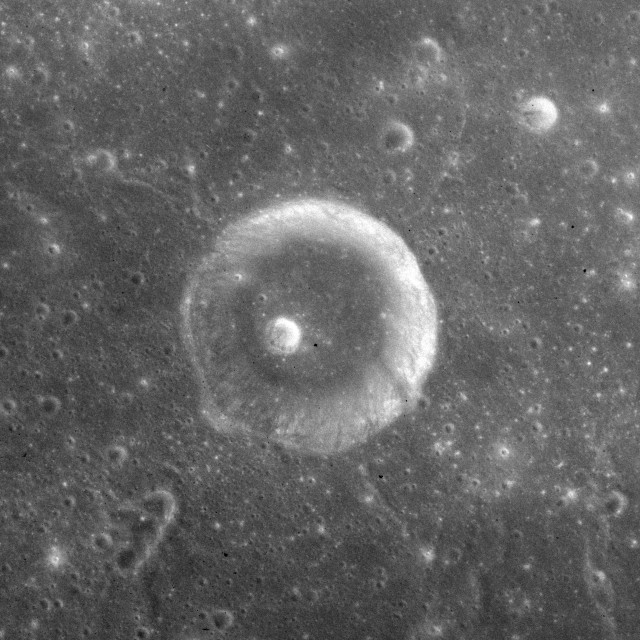
- Apollo 15 image
- Coordinates: 6.95°S 50.44°E
- Diameter: 11.51 km (7.15 mi)
- Colongitude: 310° at sunrise
- Eponym: Ibn Battuta

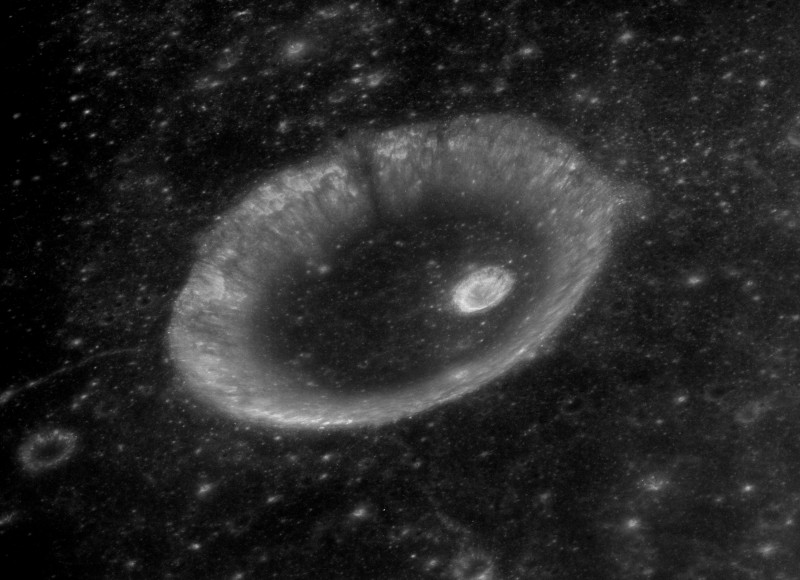
Oblique view of Ibn Battuta from Apollo 16, facing south

Ibn Battuta is a small lunar impact crater on the Mare Fecunditatis, a lunar mare in the eastern part of the Moon's near side. It lies to the southwest of the crater Lindbergh, and northeast of the prominent Goclenius.

The crater is circular and symmetrical, with a wide interior floor. The sloping inner walls have a slightly higher albedo than the surrounding mare, but the interior floor is the same dark shade as the exterior of the crater. There is a small crater on the floor near the western rim, but otherwise no significant markings.

The mare to the south and west of Ibn Battuta contains a number of ghost crater formations, consisting of crater rims that have been submerged by lava flows and now form ring-shaped projections in the surface. These are best observed under conditions of oblique lighting, when the terminator still lies on or near the Mare Fecunditatis.

This crater was formerly designated Goclenius A before being given its current name by the IAU in 1976. It was named after the Moroccan traveller and writer Ibn Battuta.
